= Marmashen Monastery =

Monastery near Marmashen, Armenia

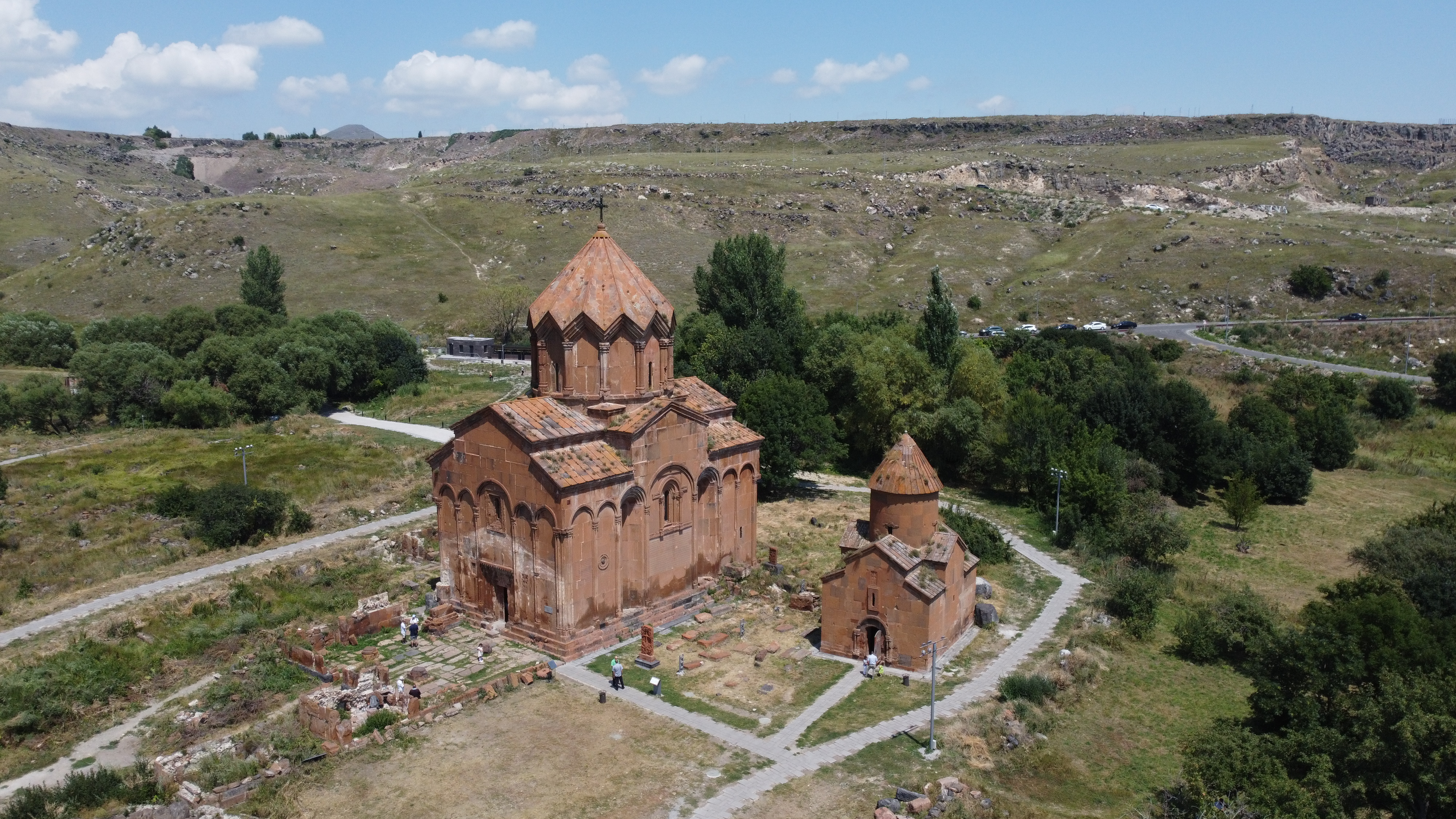
- An aerial view

- Location within Armenia Location within Shirak

Religion
- Affiliation: Armenian Apostolic Church

Location
- Location: near Marmashen, Shirak Province, Armenia
- Coordinates: 40.842689°N 43.755781°E

Architecture
- Style: Armenian
- Completed: 10th century

Marmashen Monastery (Armenian: Մարմաշենի վանք) is a 10th-century Armenian monastic complex consisting of five churches near the village of Marmashen in the Shirak Province of Armenia. The buildings at Marmashen are very similar in style to those of Khtzkonk Monastery.

It was built by Vahram Pahlavouni.

== Gallery ==
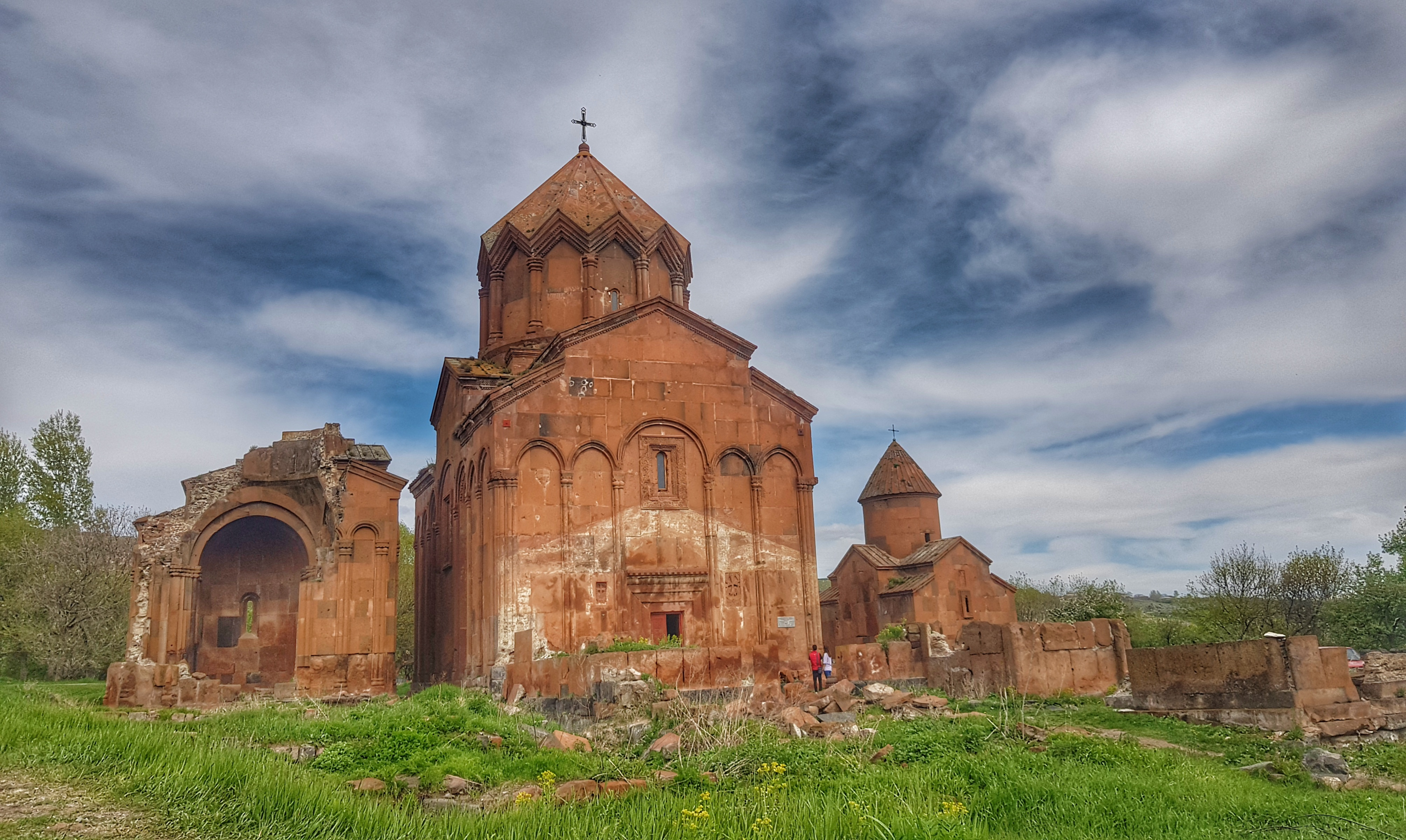
General view

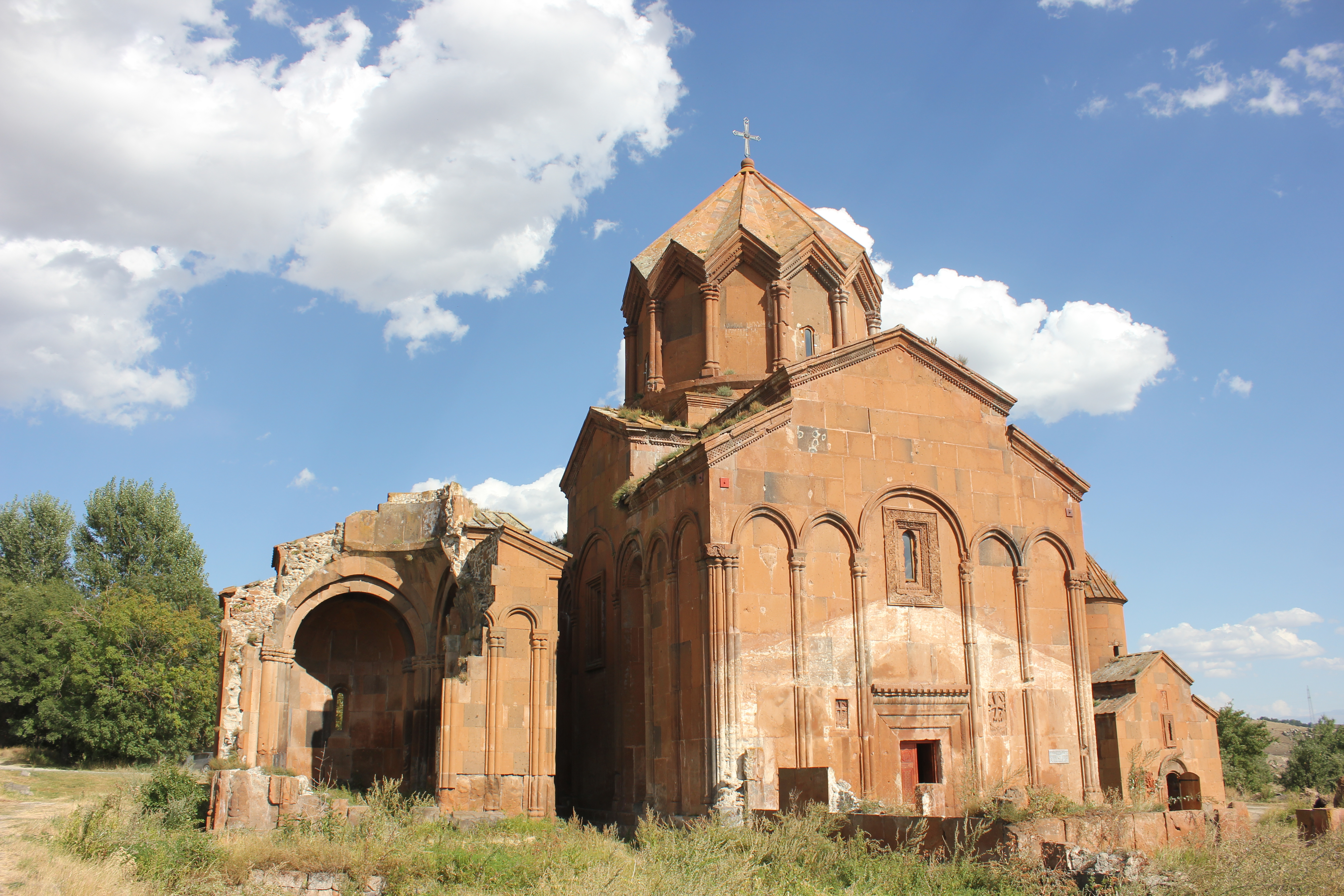

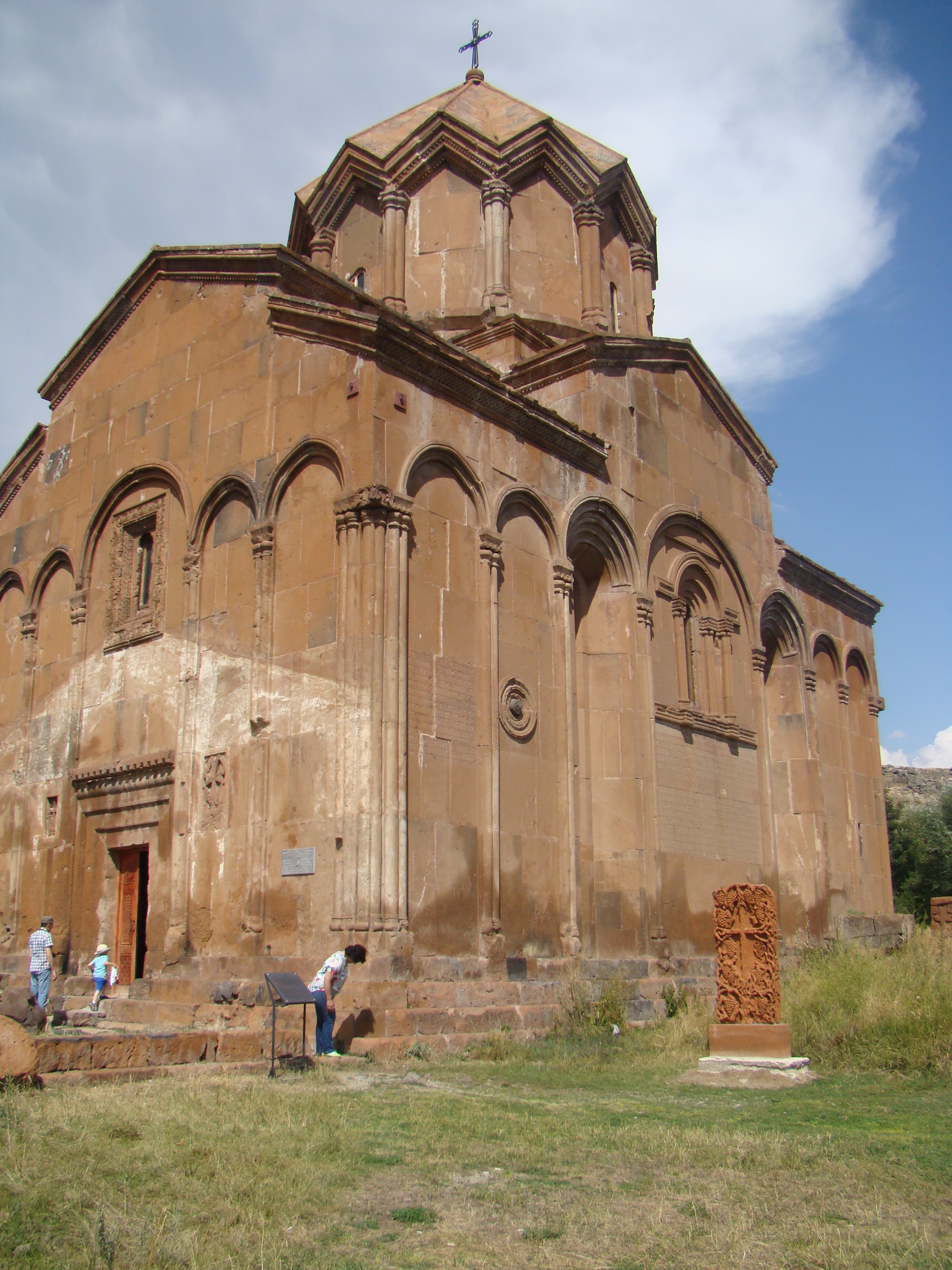
Katoghike (Surb Stephanos)

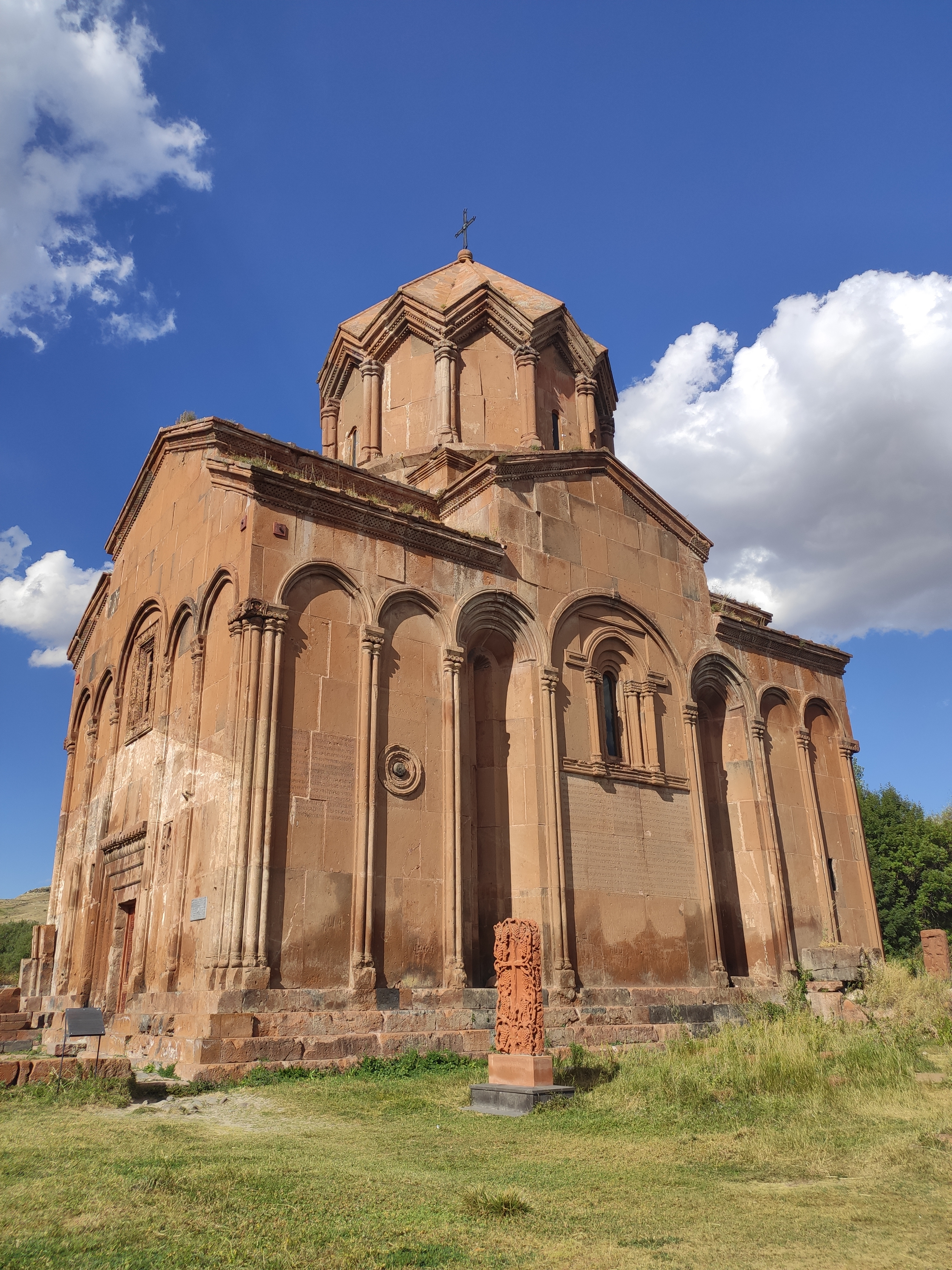

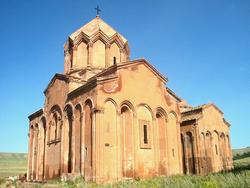
Backside view

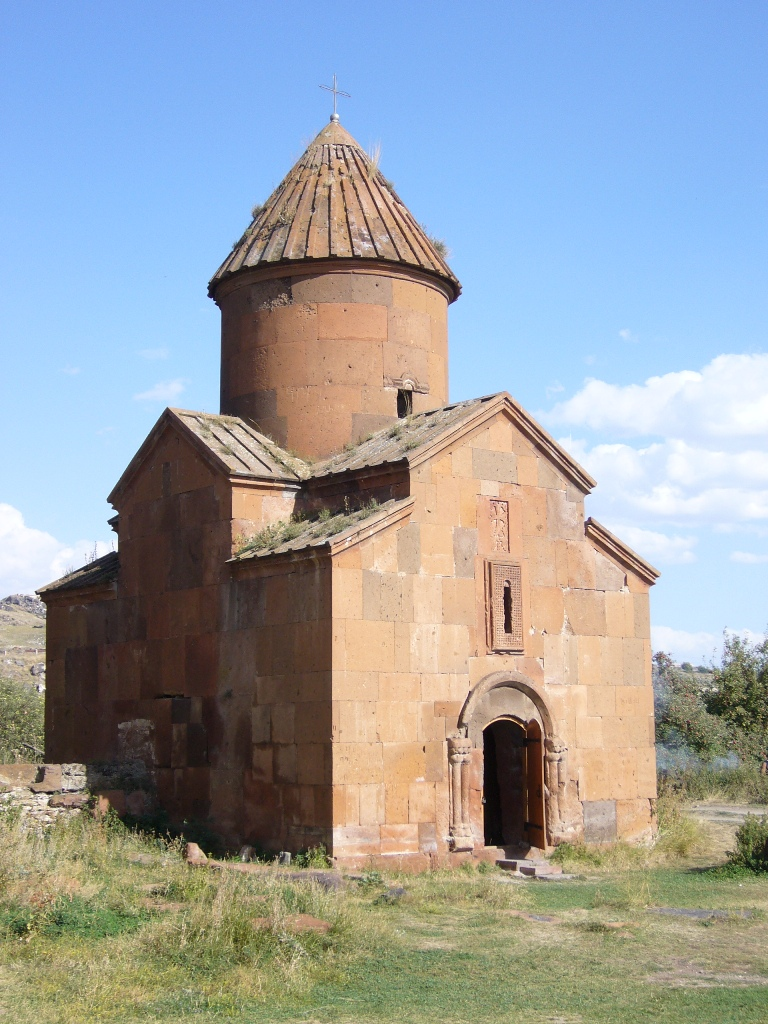
Surb Petros, adjacent to the main church.

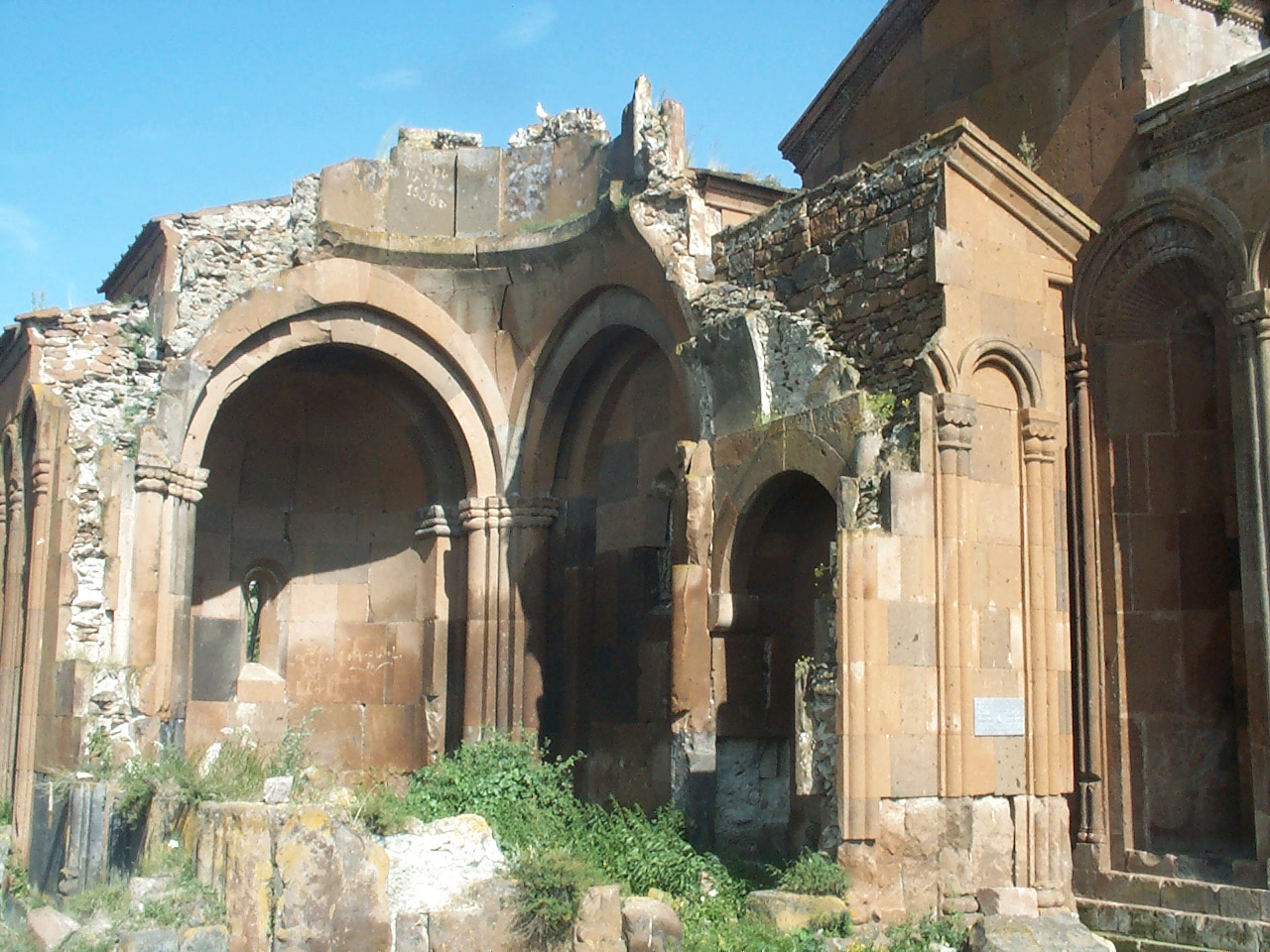
Surb Astvatsatsin (Mother of God)

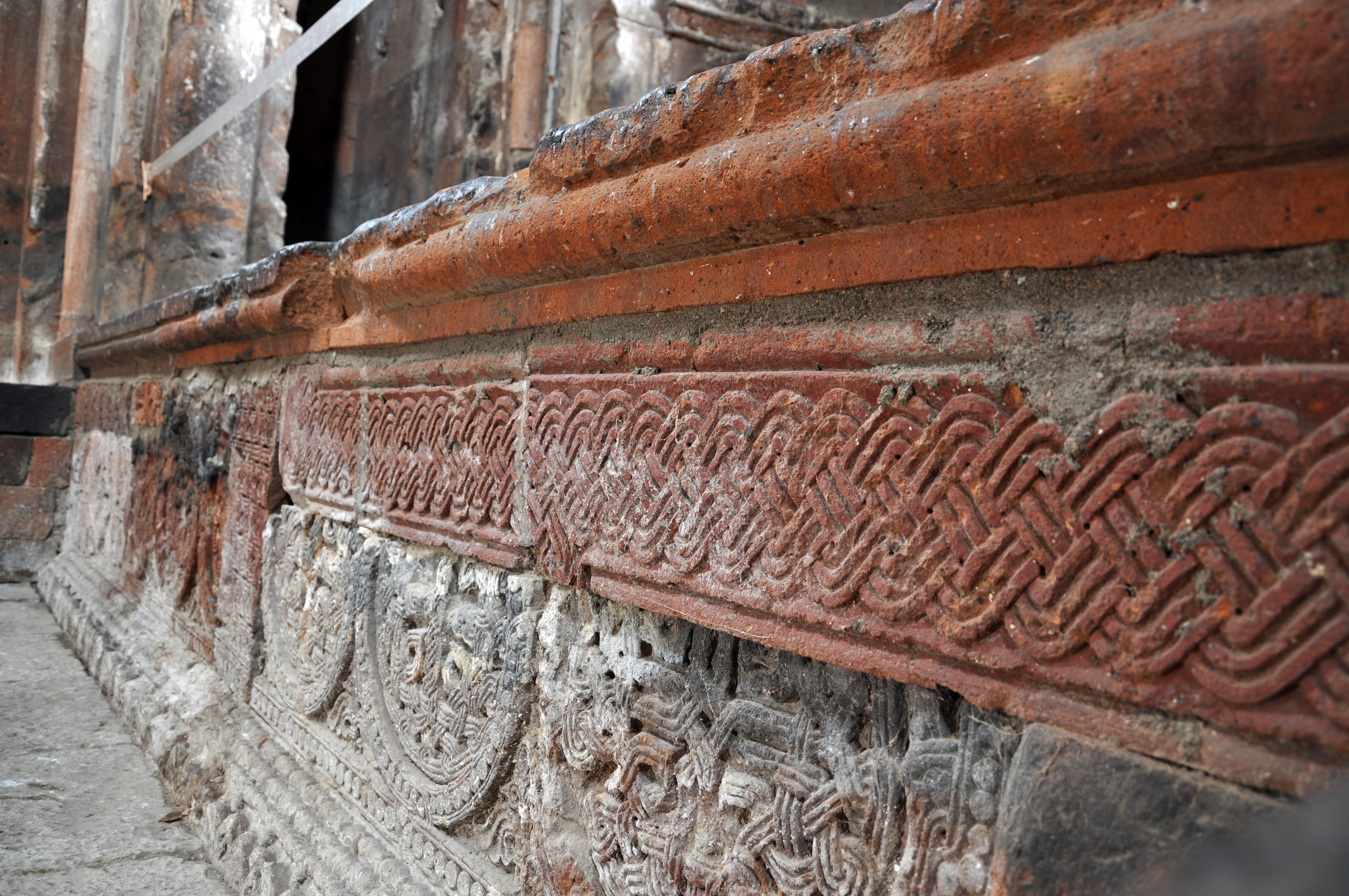
Decoration at the Katoghike's altar.

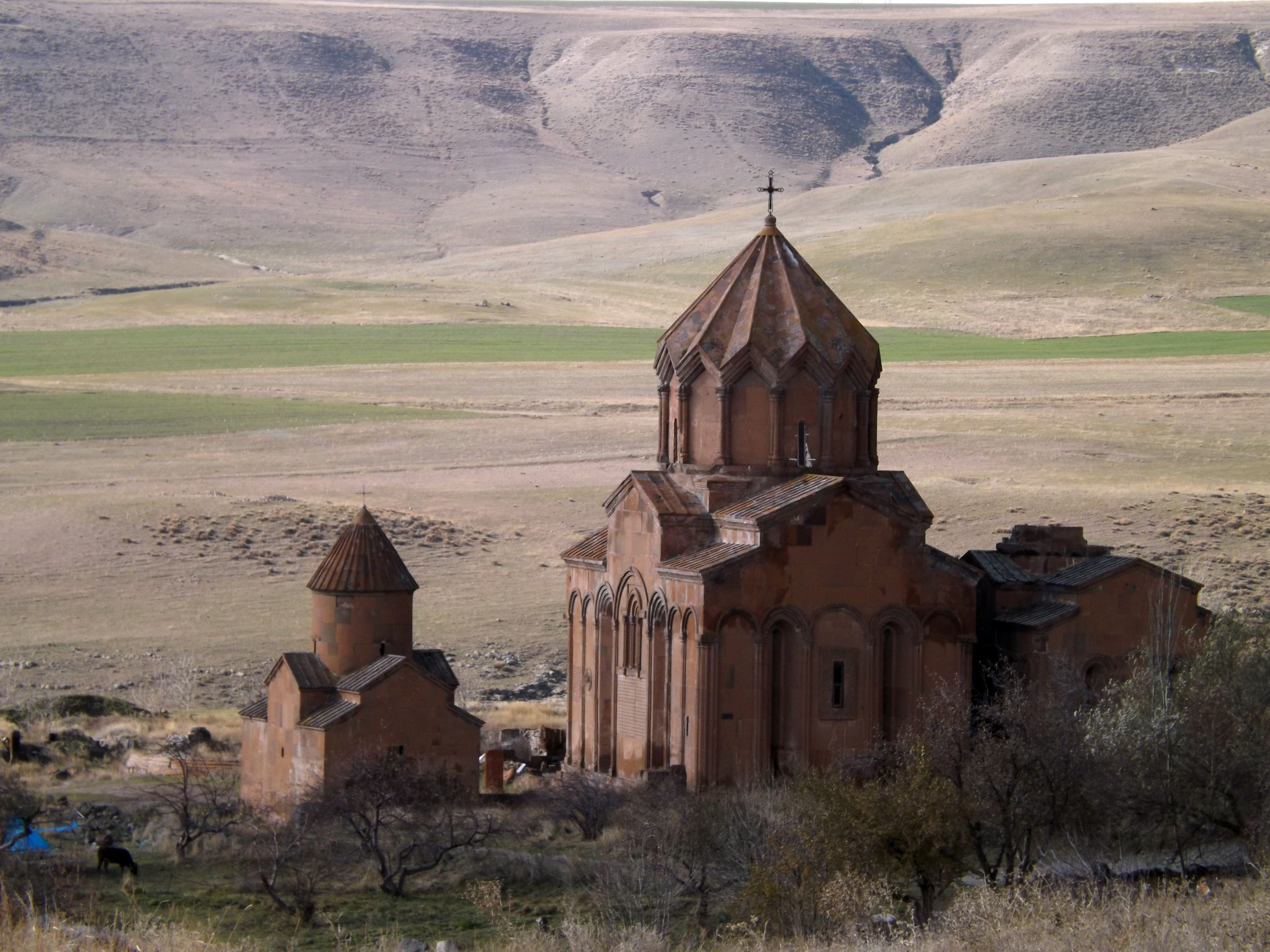
Marmashen Monastery

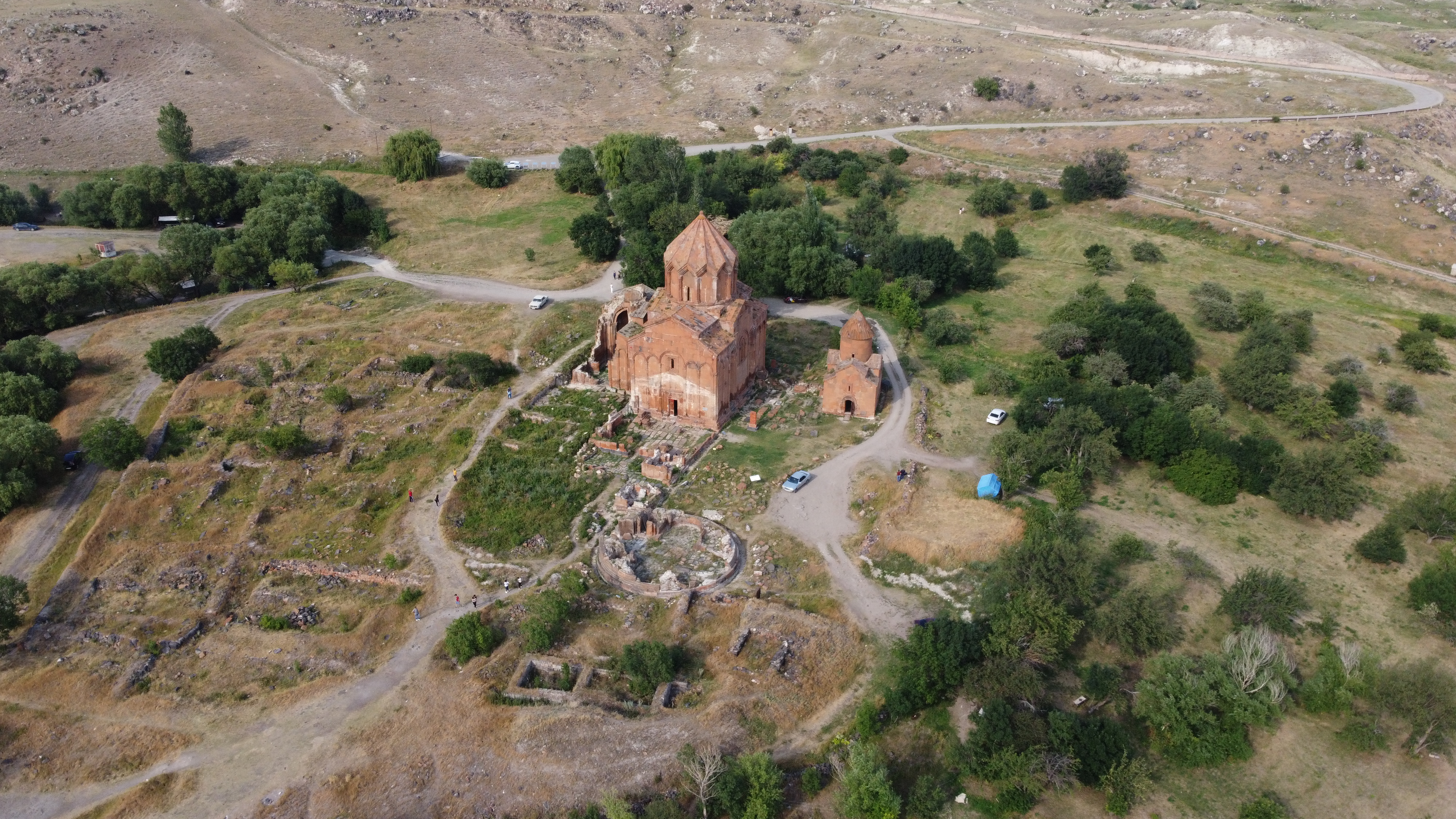
Marmashen Monastery, view from above

== Bibliography ==
- Balasanyan, Hayk (2008). Մարմաշենի ճարտարապետական համալիրը և վիմագրերը [The Architectural Complex and Inscriptions of Marmashen] (PDF). Etchmiadzin (in Armenian). ԿԴ [LXIV] (Զ–Է [6–7]). Mother See of Holy Etchmiadzin: 118–126. Archived (PDF) from the original on 20 December 2022 – via Union Catalog of Armenian Continuing Resources.
