= Kocaköy, Digor =

Kocaköy
- Village
- Location within Turkey
- Coordinates: 40°17′N 43°28′E
- Country: Turkey
- Province: Kars
- District: Digor
- Elevation: 1,600 m (5,200 ft)
- Population (2022): 1,815
- Time zone: UTC+3 (TRT)
- Postal code: 36670
- Area code: 0474

Kocaköy (Armenian: Նախիջևան) is a village in Digor District of Kars Province, Turkey. Its population is 1,815 (2022). It is situated on a high plain. The distance to Digor is 13 kilometres (8.1 mi) and to Kars is 55 kilometres (34 mi).
