= Dağpınar =

- Municipality
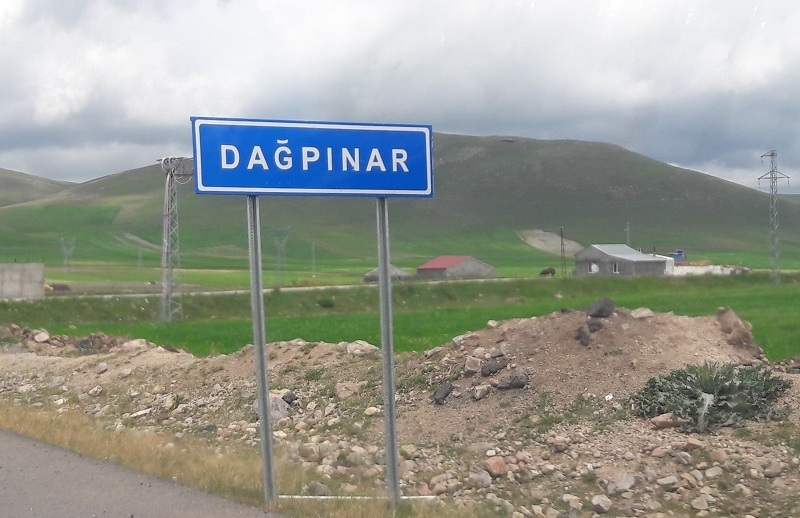

- Location within Turkey
- Coordinates: 40°28′N 43°19′E
- Country: Turkey
- Province: Kars
- District: Digor
- Elevation: 2,100 m (6,900 ft)
- Population (2022): 3,094
- Time zone: UTC+3 (TRT)
- Postal code: 36680
- Area code: 0474

Dağpınar (Armenian: Բազարջիկ, romanized: Bazarjik) is a town (belde) in the Digor District, Kars Province, Turkey. Its population is 3,094 (2022). It is situated on a high plateau between Kars and Digor. The distance to Digor is 20 kilometres (12 mi) and to Kars is 25 kilometres (16 mi).
