= Mahmut Alınak =

Turkish politician

- Mehmûd Alinak

Member of the Grand National Assembly
- In office 1987 – 17 March 1994
- Constituency: Kars (1987); Şırnak (1991)

Personal details
- Born: 1952 (age 73–74) Digor
- Citizenship: Turkish
- Party: Democracy Party Democratic Society Party
- Education: Ankara University

Mahmut Alınak (Kurdish: Mehmûd Alinak) (born 1952, Dolaylı, Digor, Kars Province), also known as Mehmûd Avdo is a Turkish lawyer, author and politician, of Kurdish origin, and a former parliamentary deputy.

== Career ==
Alınak is a graduate of Ankara University's law faculty. In the 1987 Turkish general election he was elected to the Grand National Assembly of Turkey for the Social Democratic Populist Party (SHP), representing Kars province. In November 1989 he was expelled from the SHP together with six other Kurdish MPs for having attended a Kurdish conference in Paris. In the 1991 Turkish general election he was re-elected to parliament, this time representing Şırnak province, and later joining others in the new Democracy Party (DEP). He was one of six DEP deputies (amongst them Leyla Zana, Hatip Dicle and Ahmet Türk) whose parliamentary immunity was removed in 1994 to enable prosecution for alleged promotion of Kurdish separatism. He was sentenced to three years and six months for separatist propaganda in December 1994.

In September 1997 Alınak published a novel, Şiro'nun Ateşi ("The Heat of Şiro") based on the real events of the village of Ormaniçi in the Güçlükonak district of the province of Şırnak, where villagers were mistreated by state security and tried unsuccessfully to obtain justice. The book was seized and banned, which the European Court of Human Rights ruled a breach of Article 10 of the European Convention on Human Rights in 2005.

He was later the local chairman in Kars for the Democratic Society Party (DTP), and was an independent candidate associated with the party in the 2007 general elections, but failed to enter parliament. In 2008 he withdrew from a contest in which Ahmet Türk became co-leader of the party, saying he did not want to run against his friend.

In May 2007 Alınak was sentenced to 10 months in prison under Article 301, for his remarks about the Şemdinli incident, in which he described Parliament and the General Staff of Turkey as doing the bidding of the Counter-Guerrilla in protecting those responsible. In 2009 he was sentenced to five months of planting and caring for 500 trees (or else 11 months in prison) for insulting Prime Minister Recep Tayyip Erdogan. In December 2010 he was sentenced to 14 months in prison for insulting police officers (Article 125 of the TCK), for his remarks about the torture of a person in Kars.

In December 2011 he was one of many arrested in relation to the Kurdish organization Koma Civakên Kurdistan. He was held in the Kandıra F Type prison and released in July 2012. In February 2020 he was arrested again and in charged with membership in a terrorist organization and writing a book about a victim of the Cizre basement massacre and donating the revenue of the book to the family of the victim. It was his 10th arrest in his lifetime amongst other indictments. On 13 May 2020 he was released with an electronic tracking device, which was removed in July. He was again shortly detained and questioned for insulting the President in October 2020.

== Books ==
- Parlamentodan 9. koğuşa: 1, Tila Yayınevi, 1994
- HEP, DEP ve devlet: Parlamento'dan 9. koğuşa-2, Kaynak Yayınları, 1996
- Nazo: roman, Berfin Yayınları, 1998
- Ateşte yıkanmak: roman, Berfin Yayınları, 2003
- Tarihin çarmıhında "güneş ülkesi", Jan Yayınevi, 2010
- Şiro'nun ateşi ("The Heat of Şiro"), Jan Yayınevi, 2011
- Köpekler Manifestosu ("Dogs' Manifestation"), Jan Yayınları 2012,
- Mehmet Tunç ve Bêkes ("Mehmet Tunç and Bêkes(the man with no friends)"), CHA Yayınevi, 2017
