= Khtzkonk Monastery =

Armenian monastery in Turkey

Khtzkonk monastery
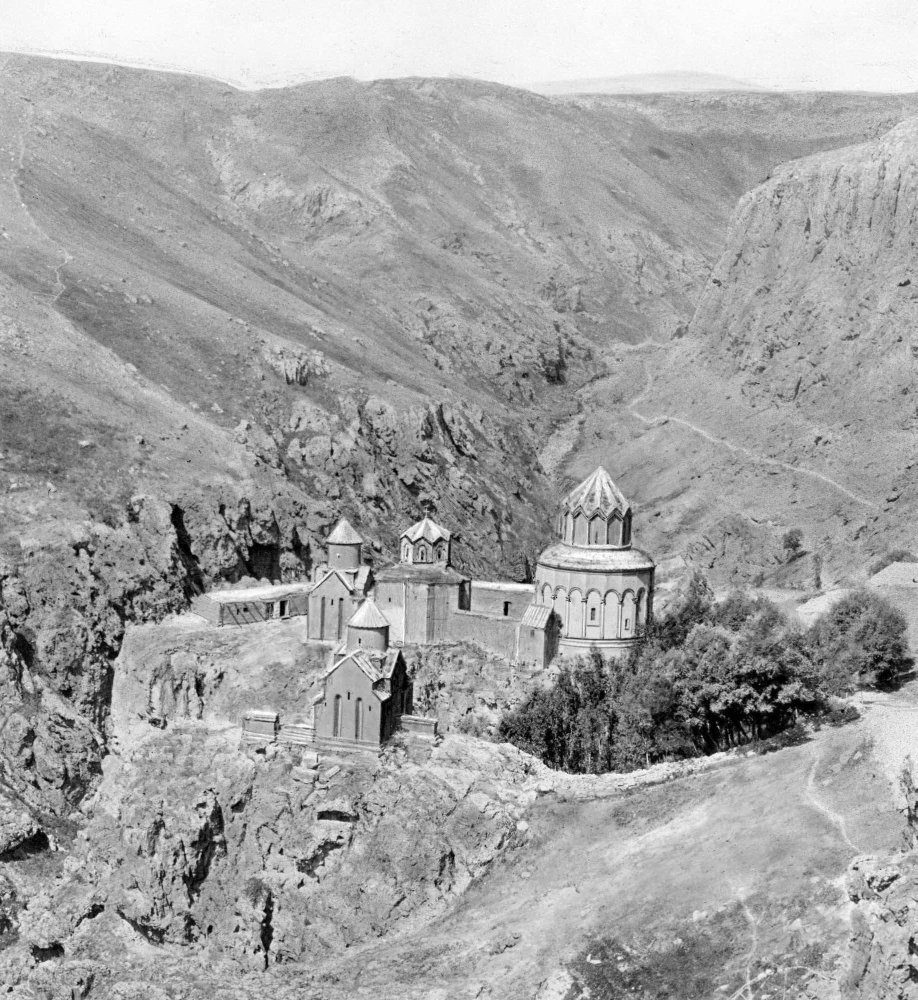
- Khtzkonk in the early 20th century

- Location within Turkey

Religion
- Affiliation: Armenian Apostolic Church
- Ecclesiastical or organisational status: Monastery
- Status: Abandoned after 1920, partially destroyed by Turkish Army in the 1950s

Location
- Location: Digor District
- Coordinates: 40.380556°N 43.376389°E

Architecture
- Style: Armenian
- Groundbreaking: Seventh century
- Completed: Thirteenth century

Khtzkonk Monastery (Armenian: Խծկոնք, also transcribed as Khtskonk and Xc'konk'; Turkish: Beşkilise) was a monastic ensemble of five Armenian churches built between the seventh and thirteenth centuries in what was then the Armenian Bagratid kingdom. The site is located near the town of Digor, the administrative capital of the Digor District of the Kars Province in Turkey, about 19 kilometres west of the border with Armenia, in a gorge formed by the Digor River.

== Present condition ==
The monastery with its five churches was intact when photographed by the Armenian archaeologist Ashkharbek Kalantar in August 1920, just before Turkey captured the region from Armenia. In 1959 the French art historian Jean-Michel Thierry visited the site and found that four of the five churches had been destroyed, with only the Church of Saint Sargis surviving. While historian Thomas Sinclair in 1987 ventured an explanation that the buildings were destroyed by "rolling rocks," others, including locals themselves, have attested that the churches were blown up by the Turkish army using high explosive rounds, which was reaffirmed by the residents of Digor in 2002. Their information is corroborated by the physical evidence on the site which "seems to confirm that these buildings were intentionally destroyed with modern, probably military means" as part of "a phenomenon that could be defined as cultural genocide." The dome of the surviving church is intact but the side walls have been blown outwards; the destroyed churches have been entirely leveled with their masonry blasted into the gorge below. This is damage that cannot have occurred as a result of an earthquake, William Dalrymple wrote similarly in 1989.

== Gallery ==
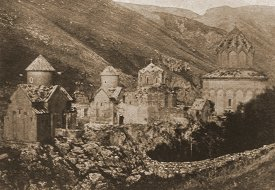
Khtzkonk, as seen in 1920.

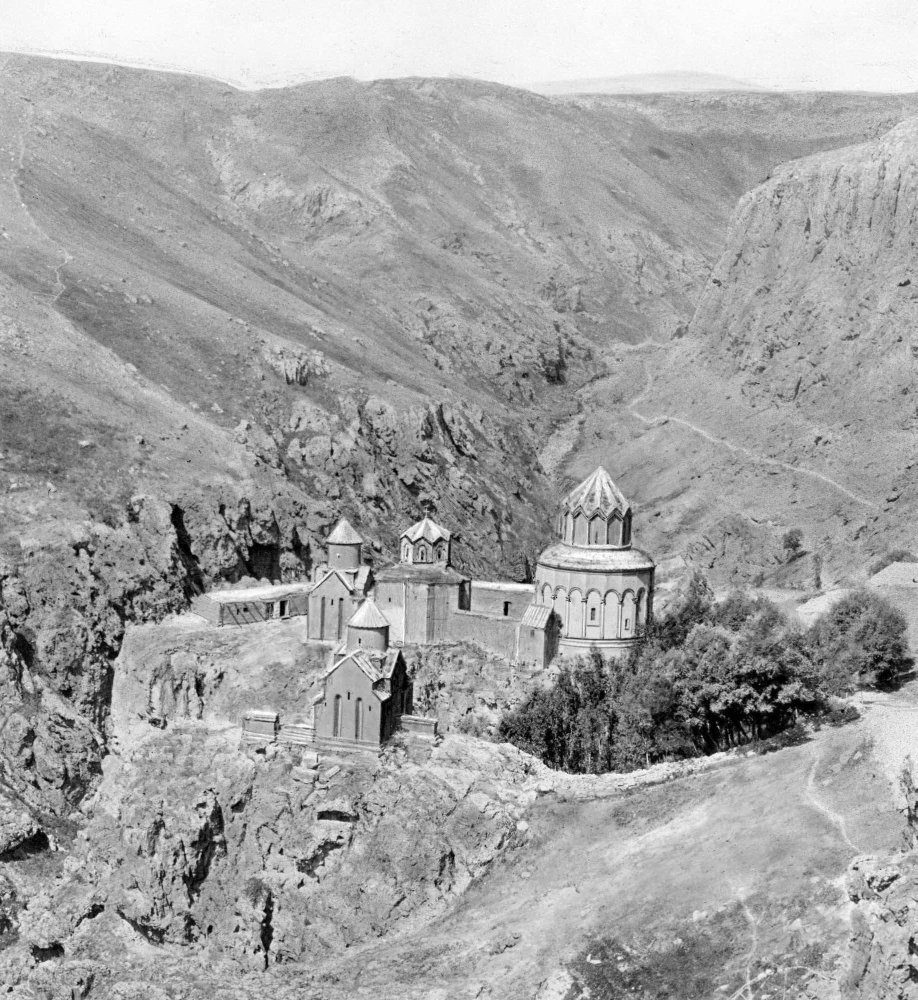
Khtzkonk, as seen in the early 20th century.

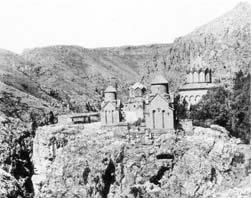

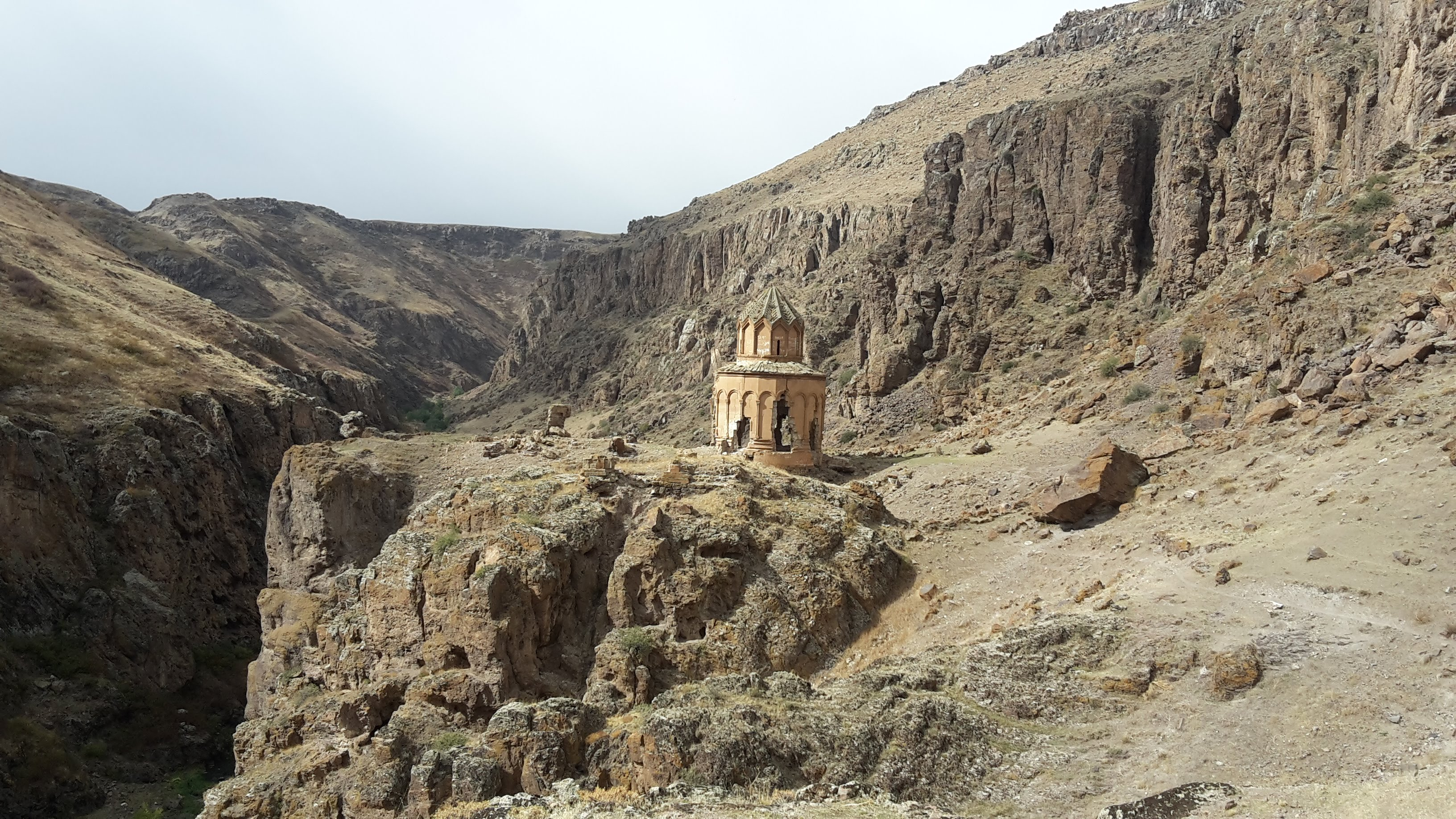
Khtzkonk today.

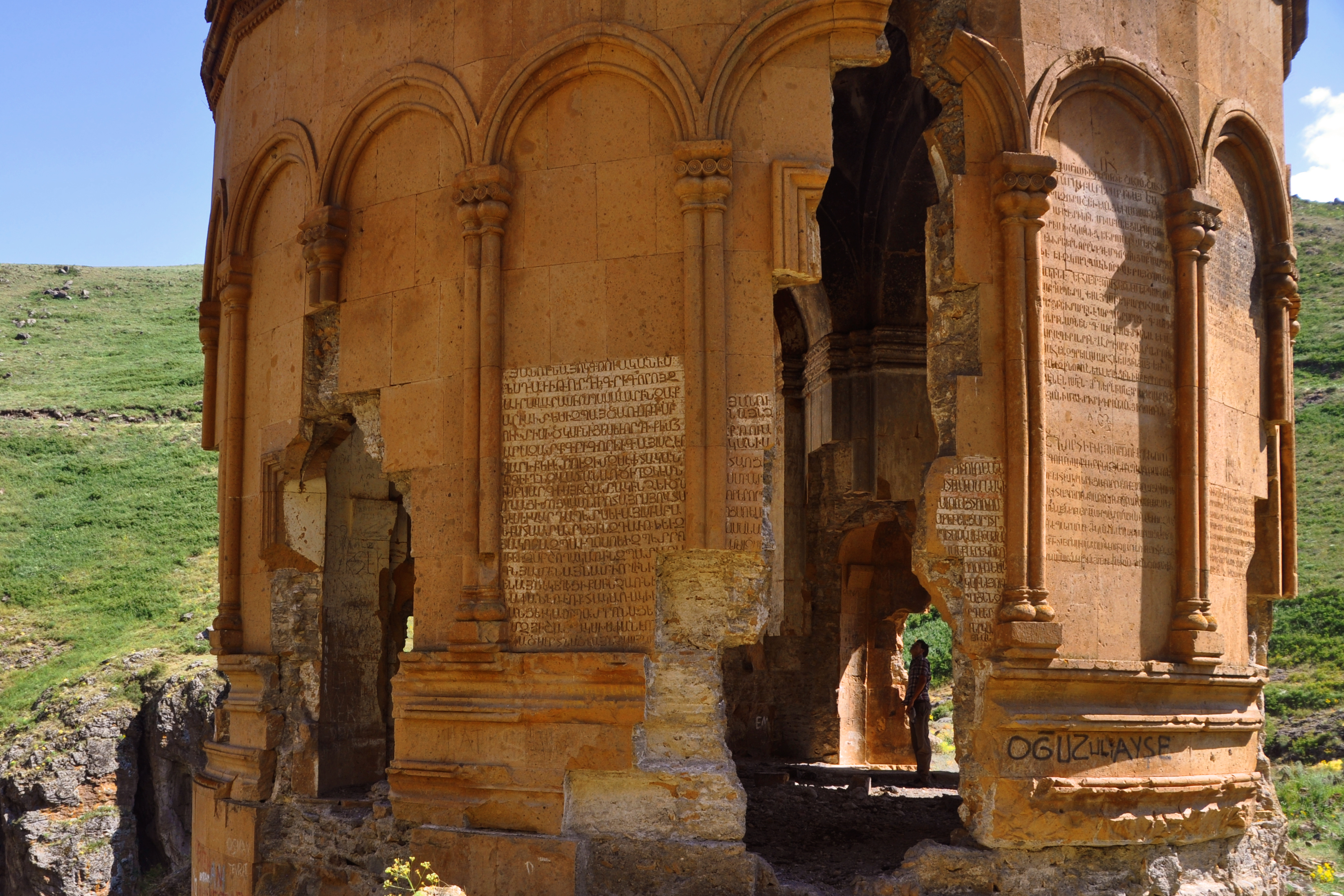

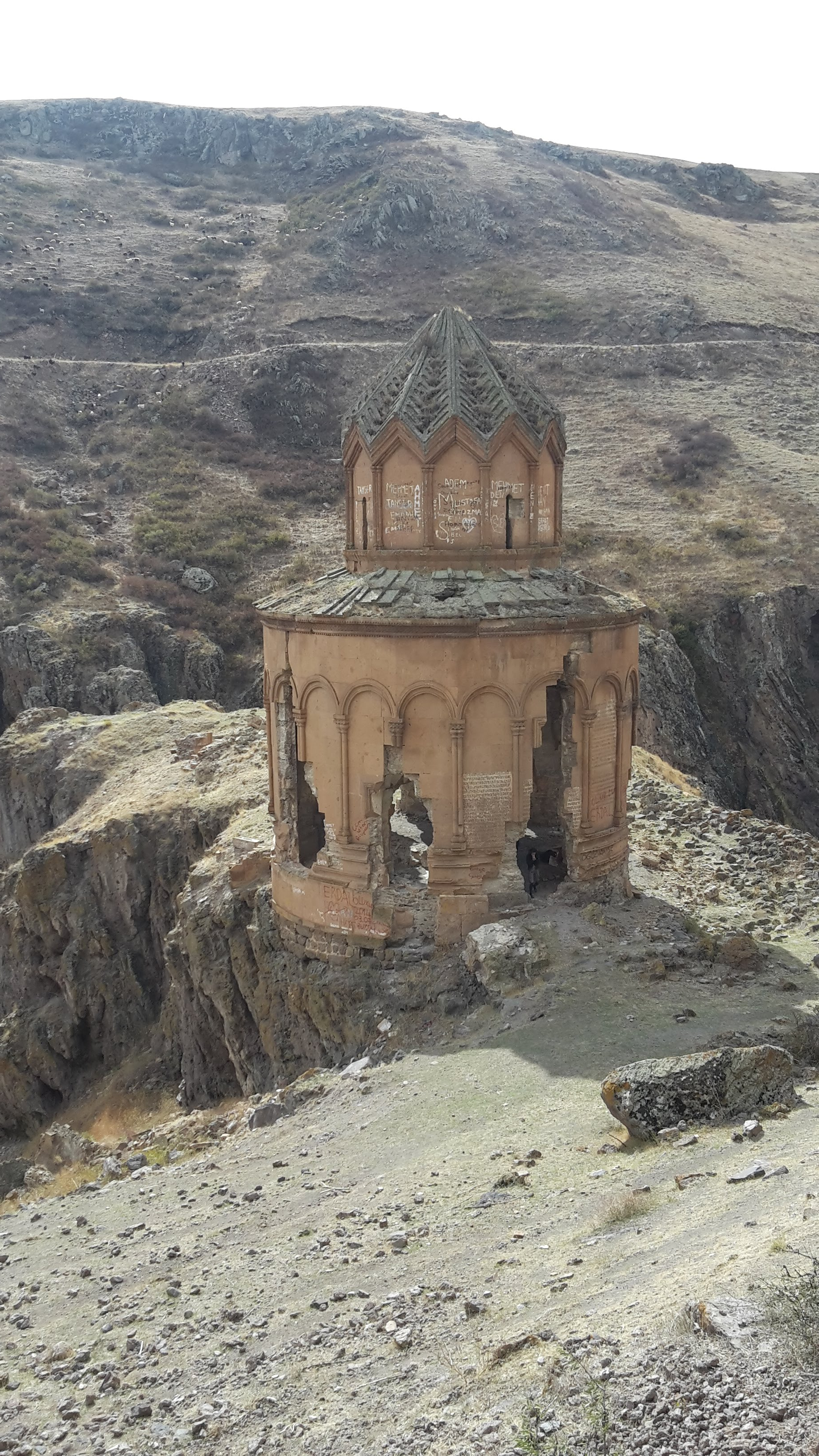

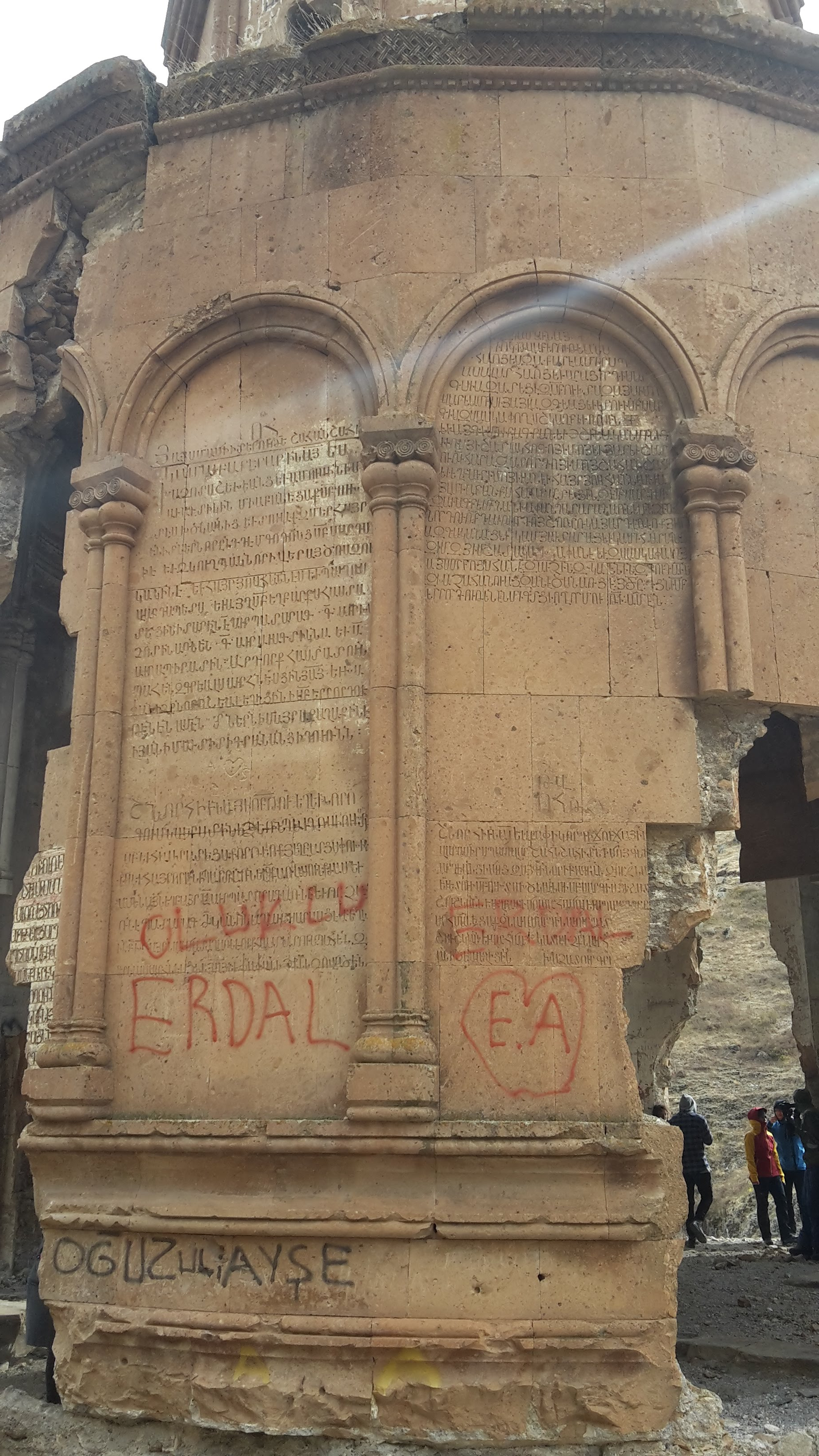

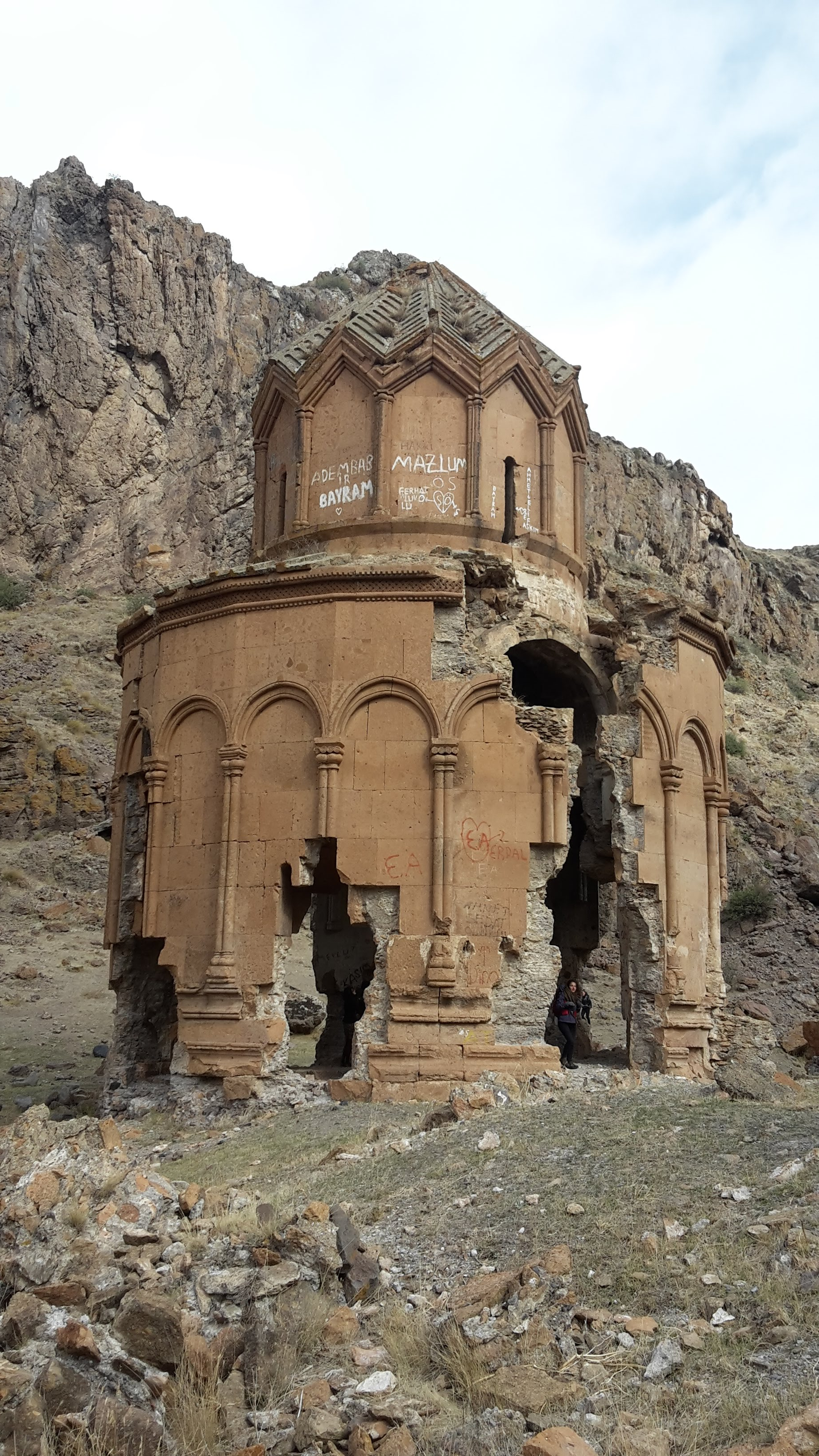

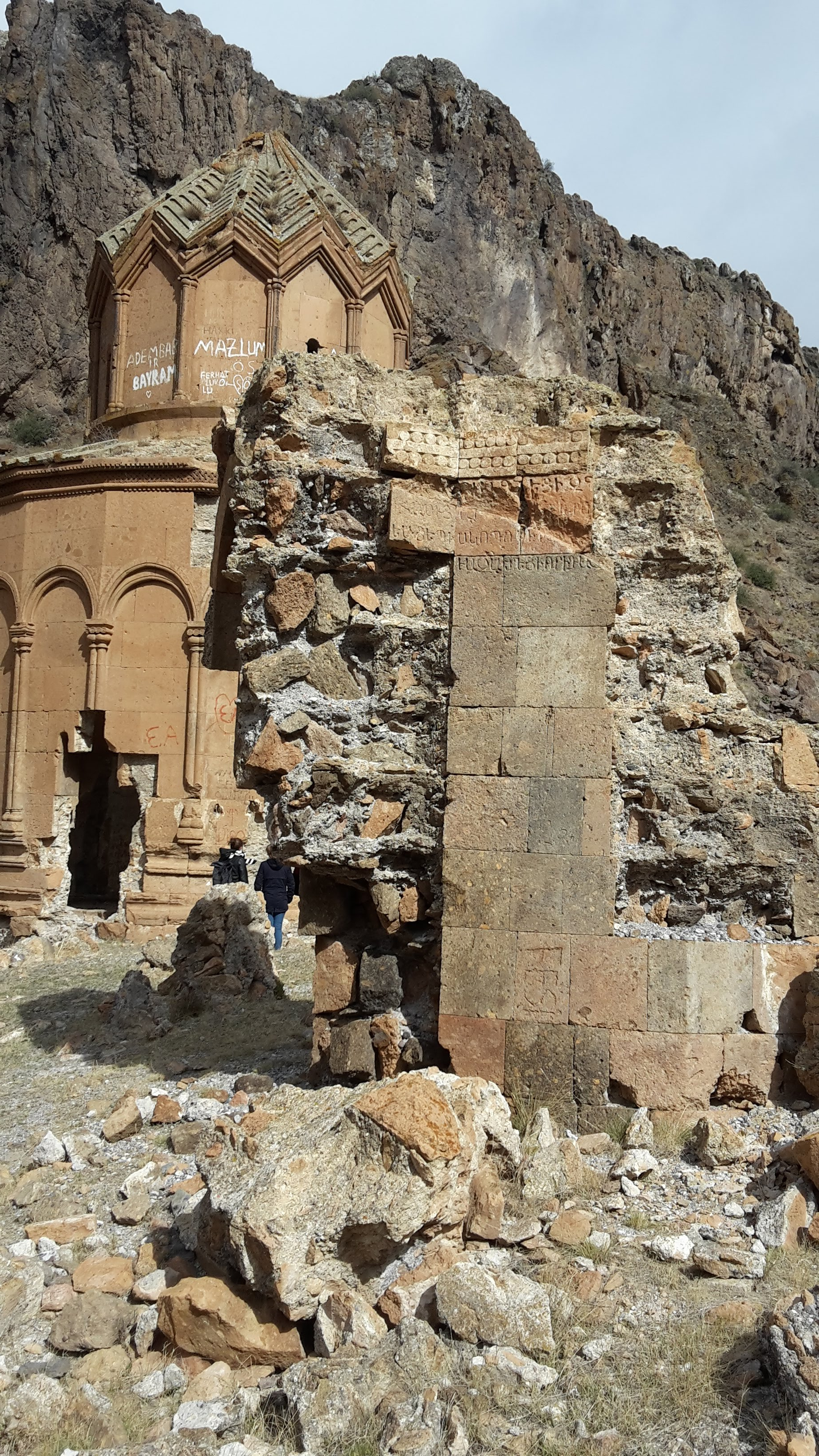

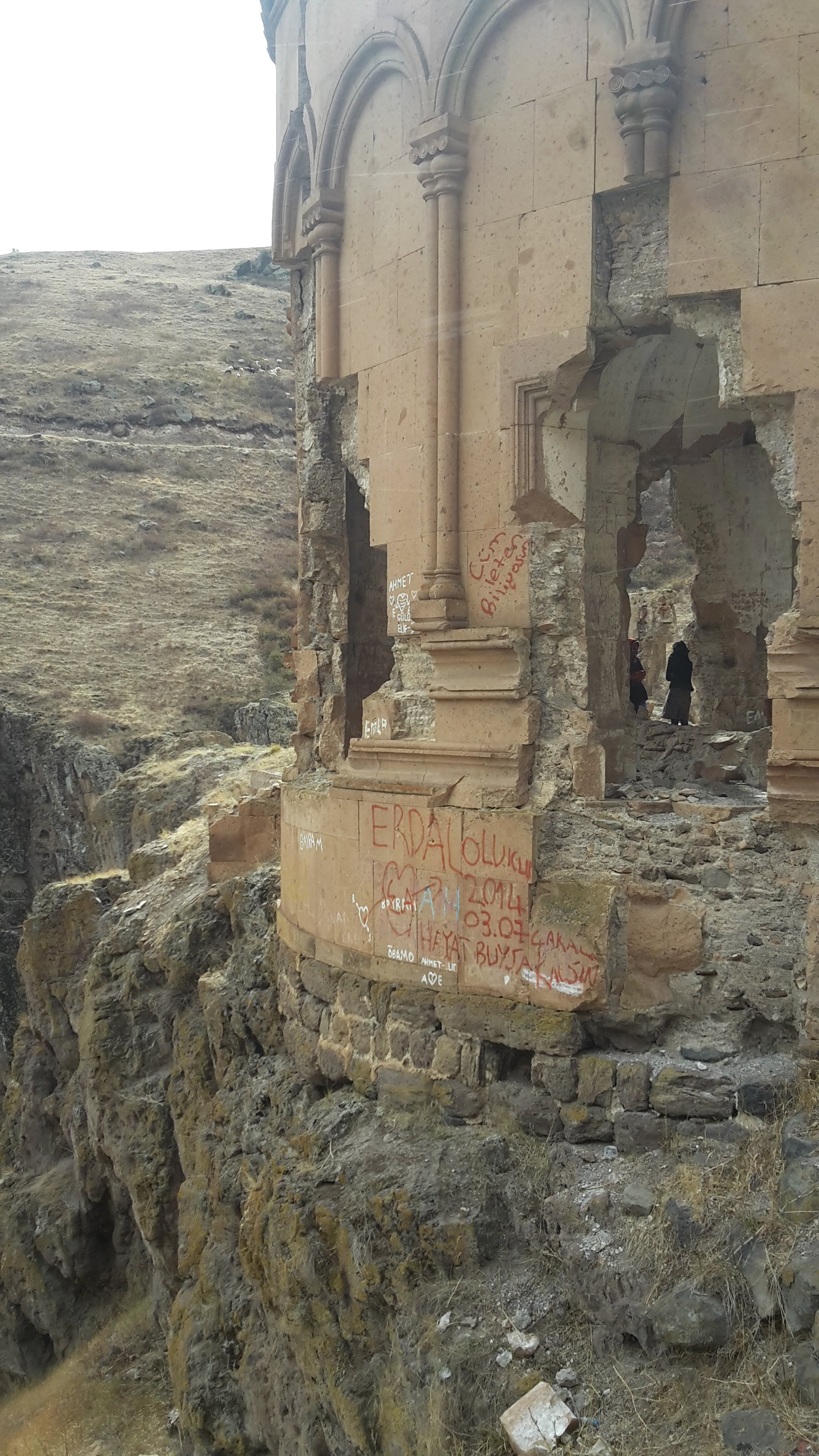
Walls of the church of Saint Sargis

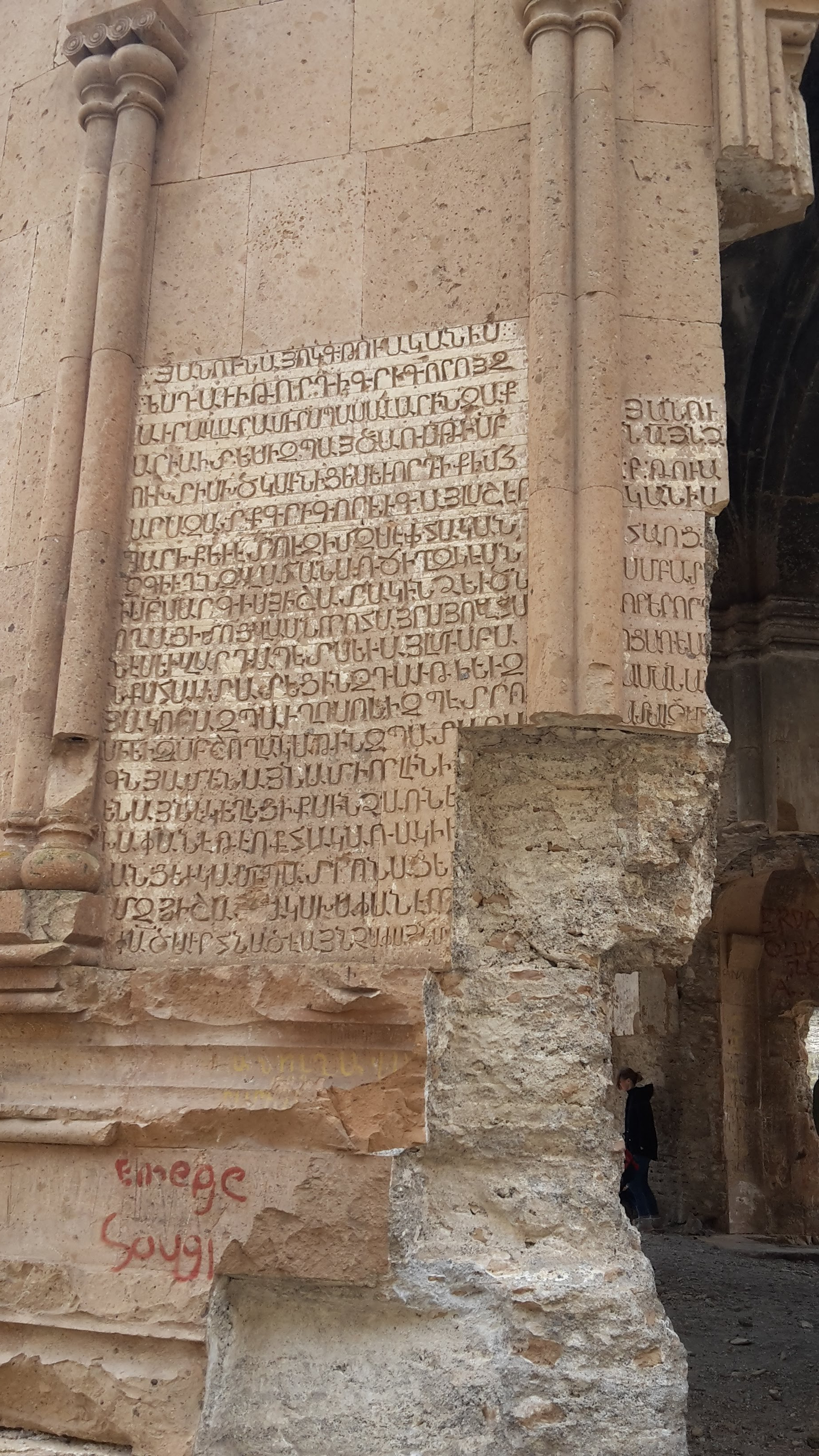
Inscription

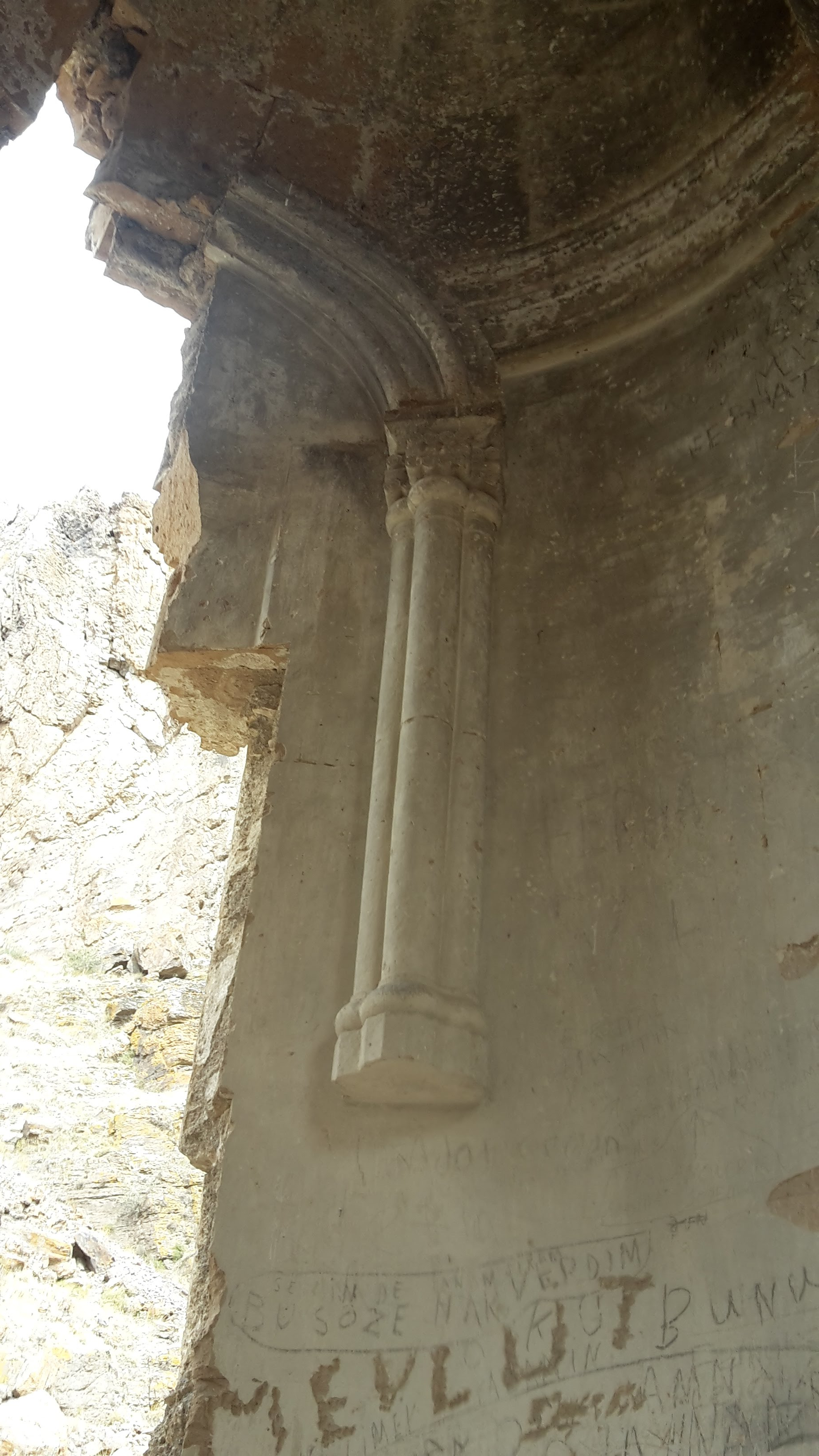
Interior walls

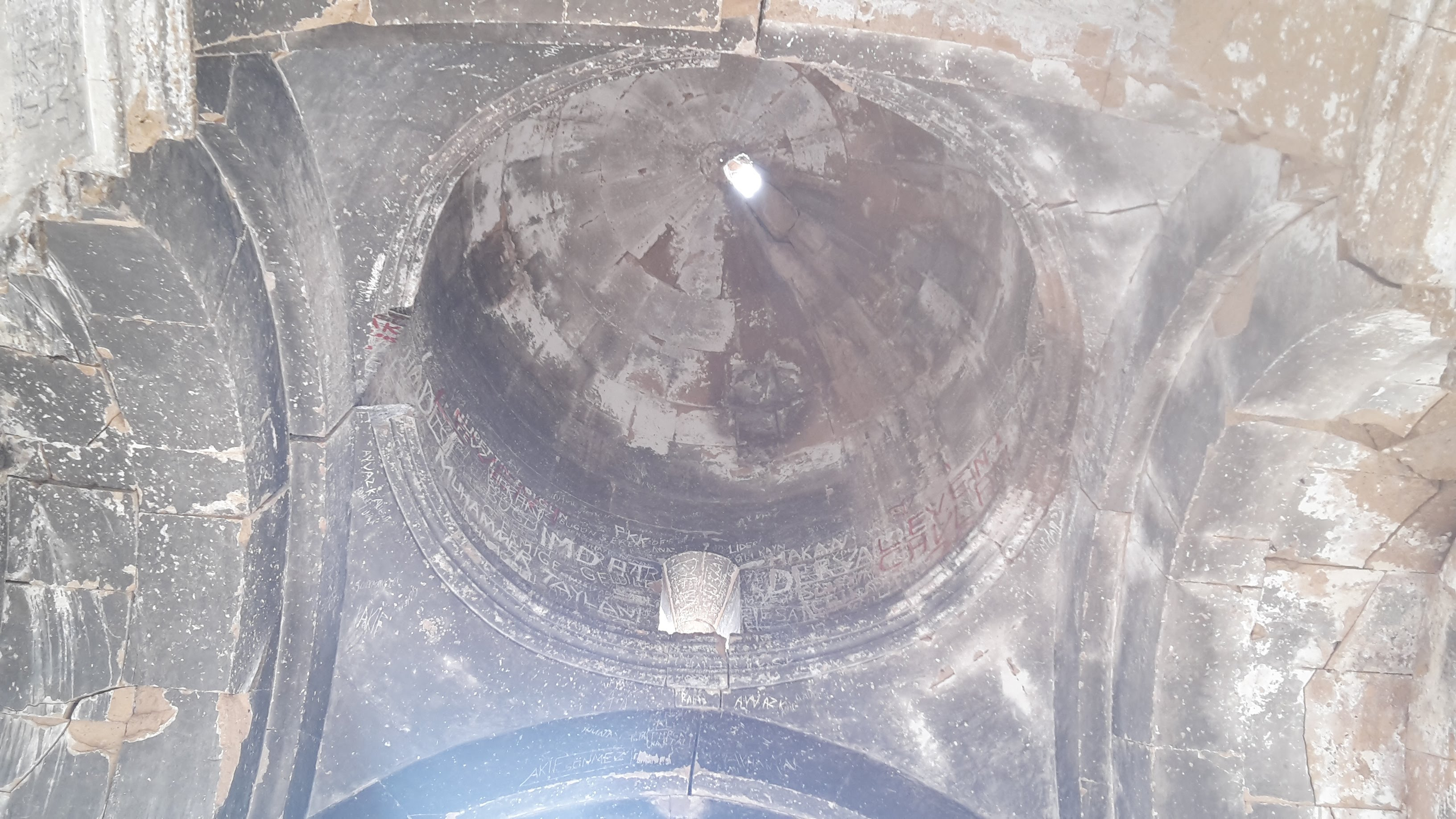
The dome

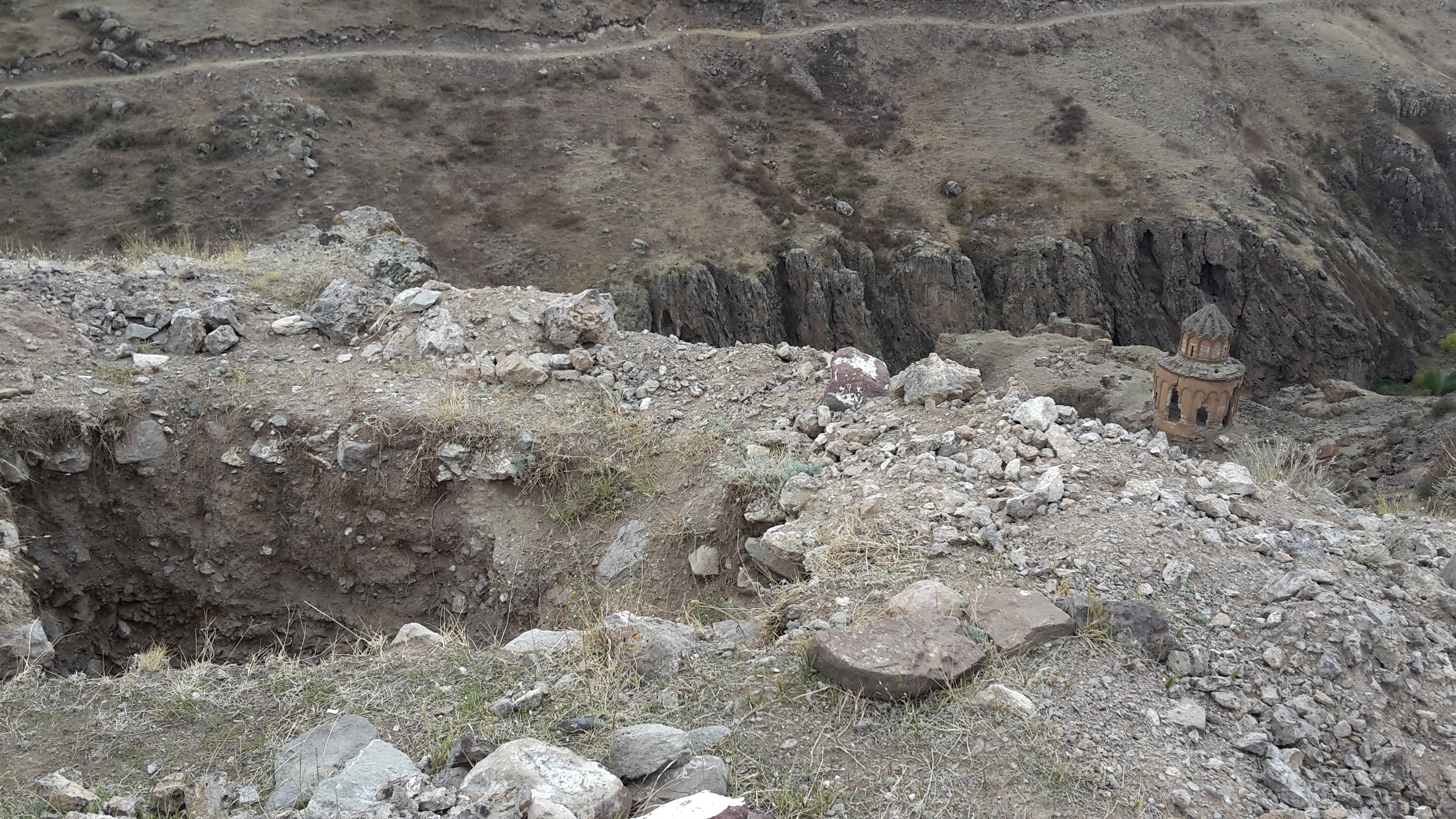
Desecrated graveyard above monastery

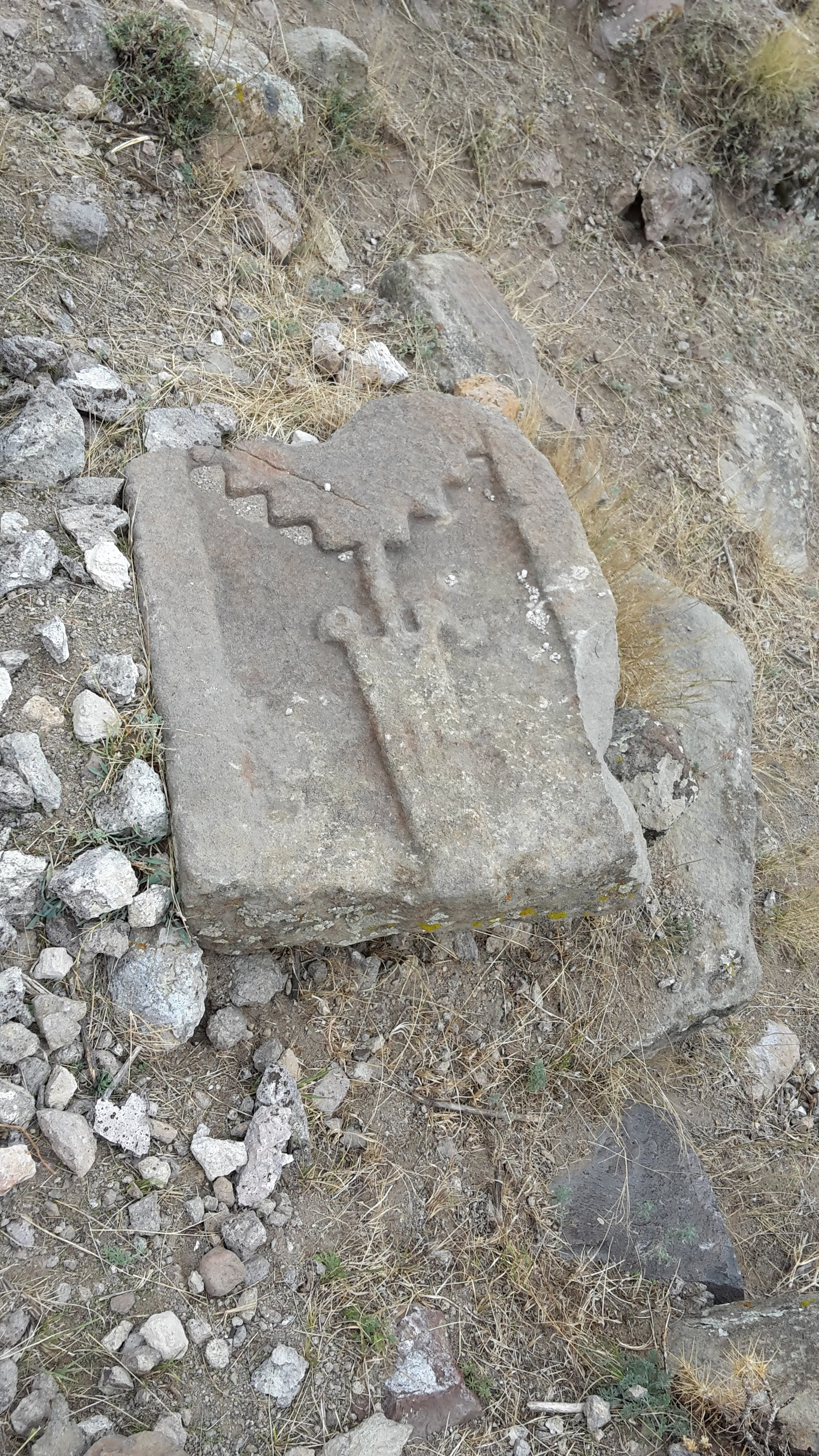
Gravestone

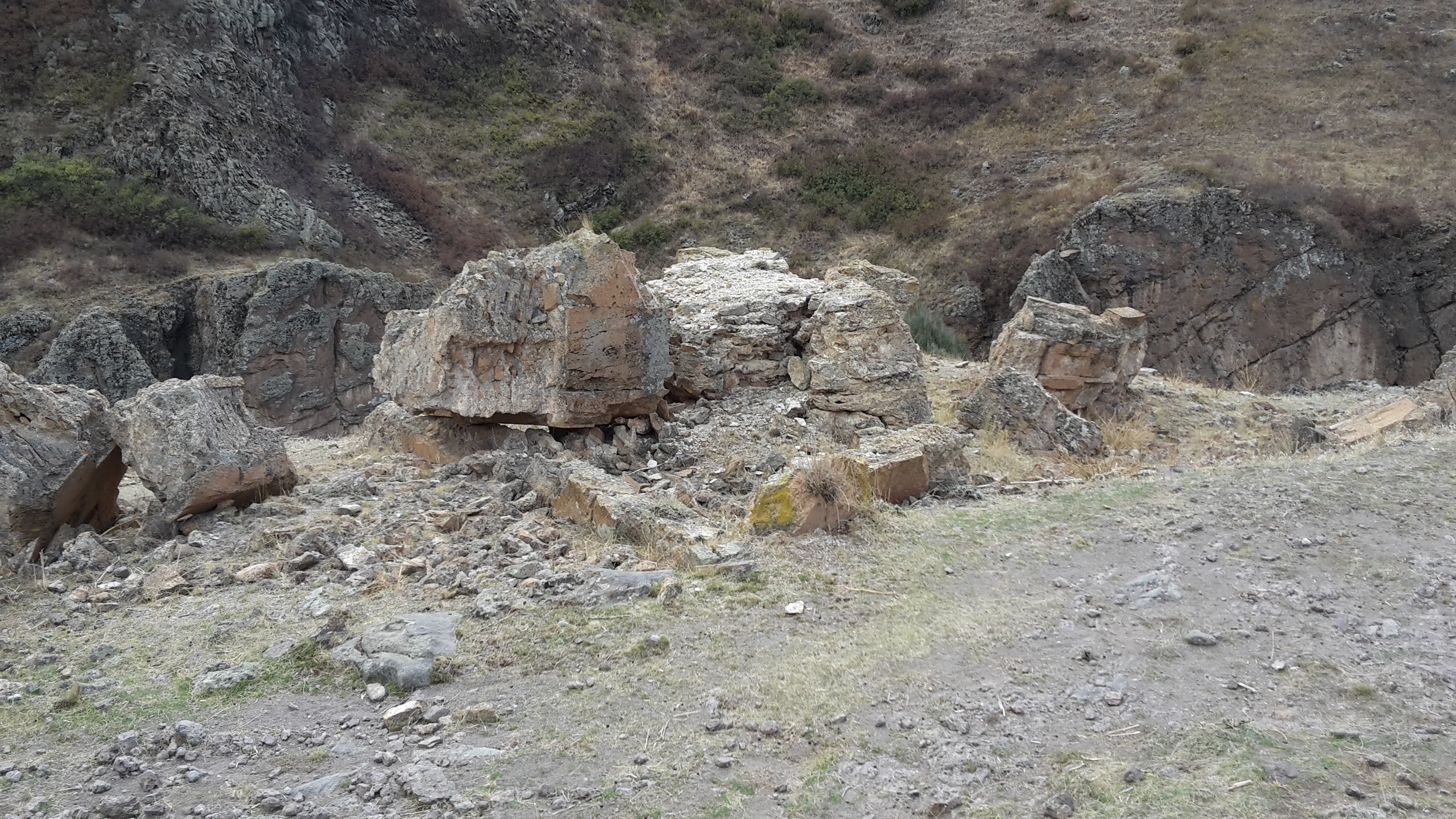
Remains of church of Saint Gregory

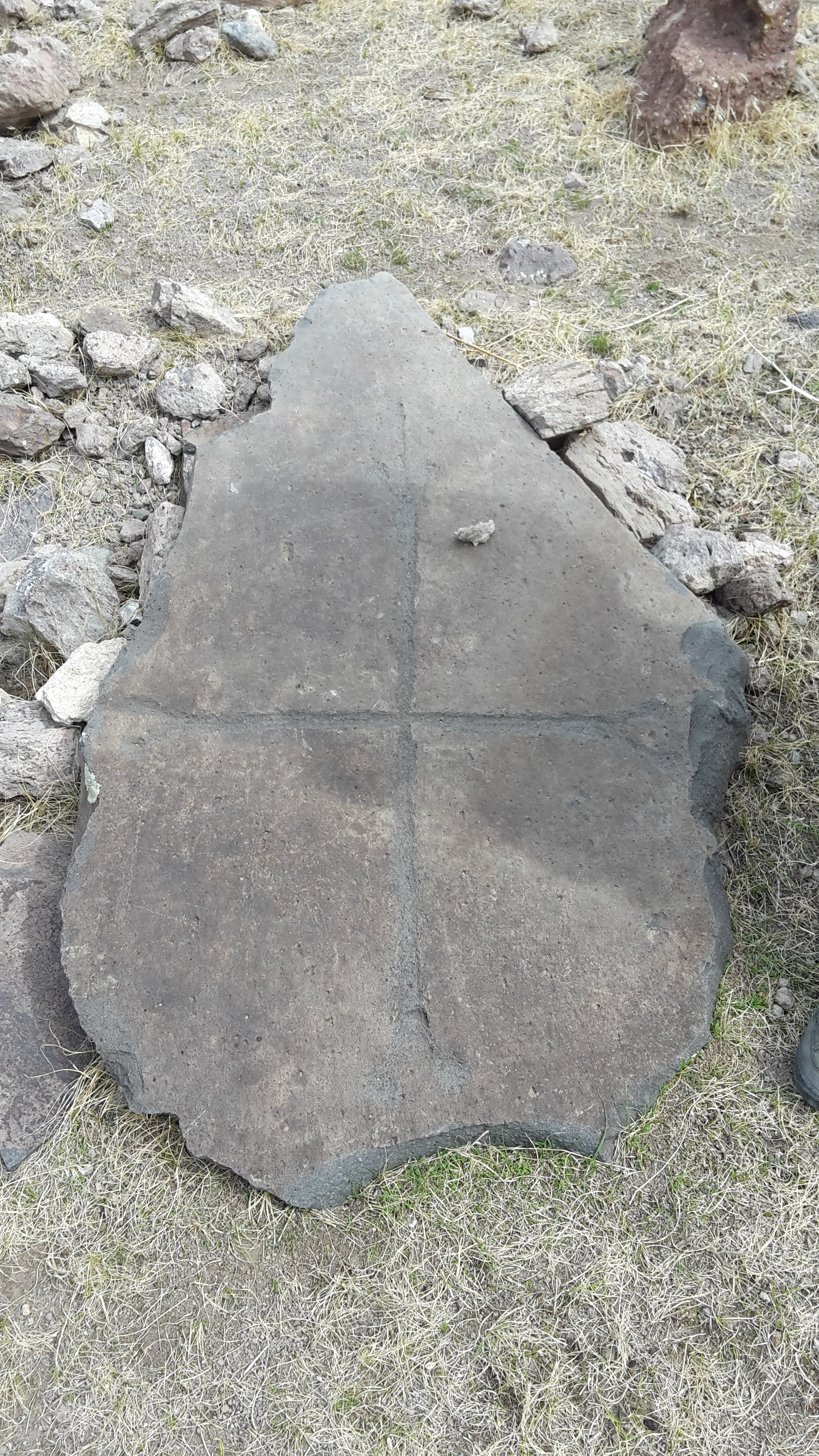

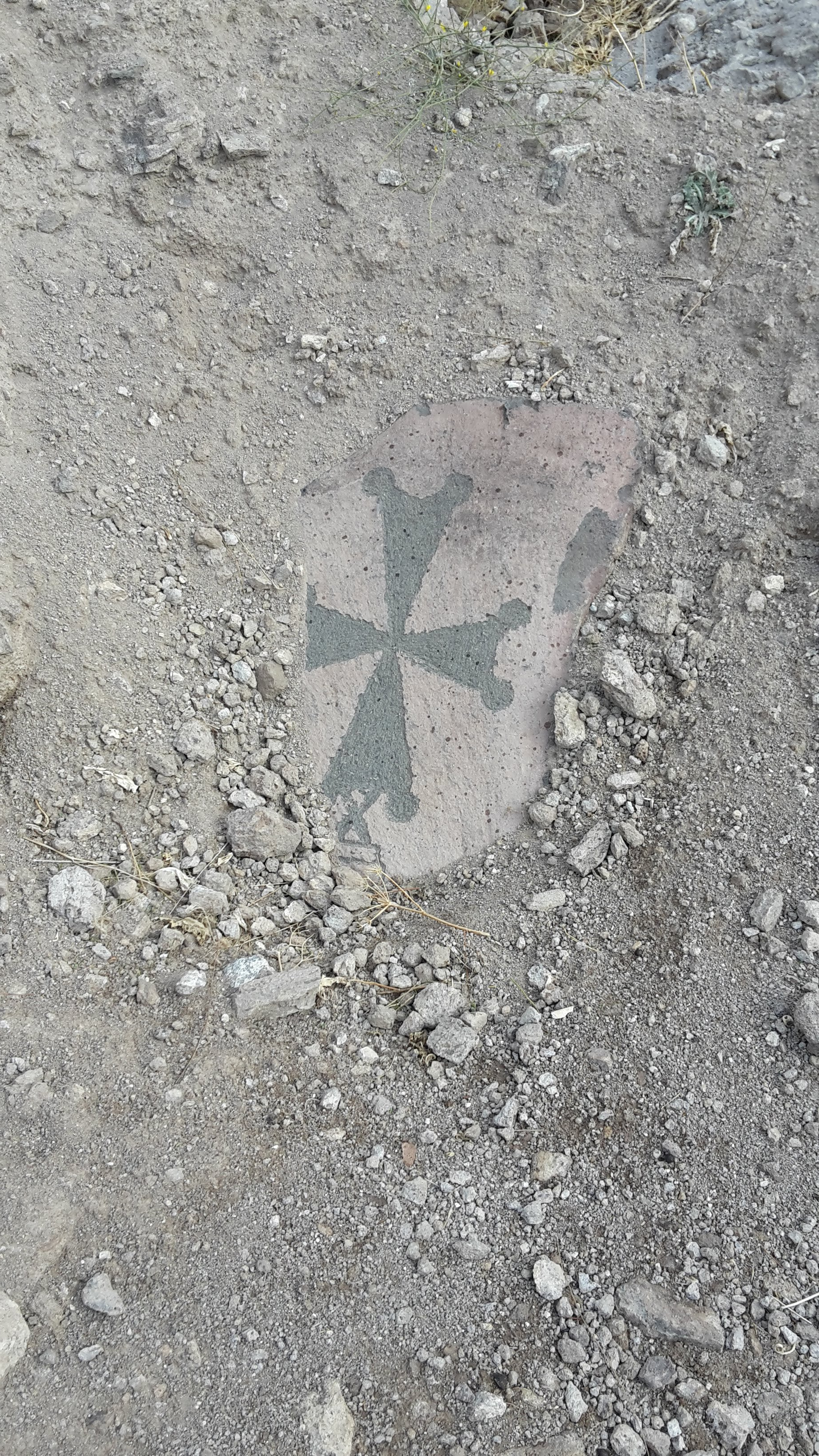

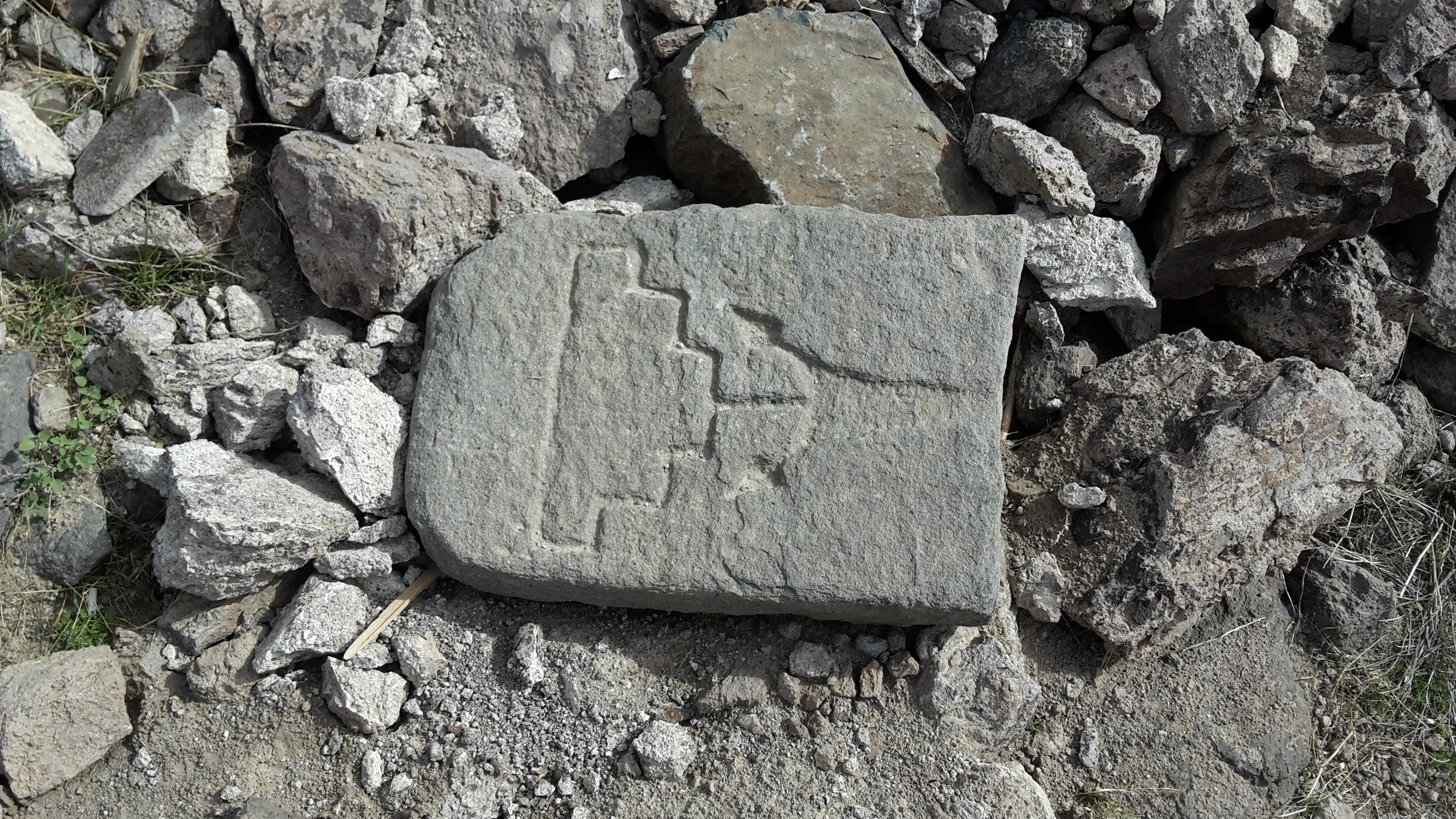
