= Battle of Ani =

Armenian victory against Byzantine forces

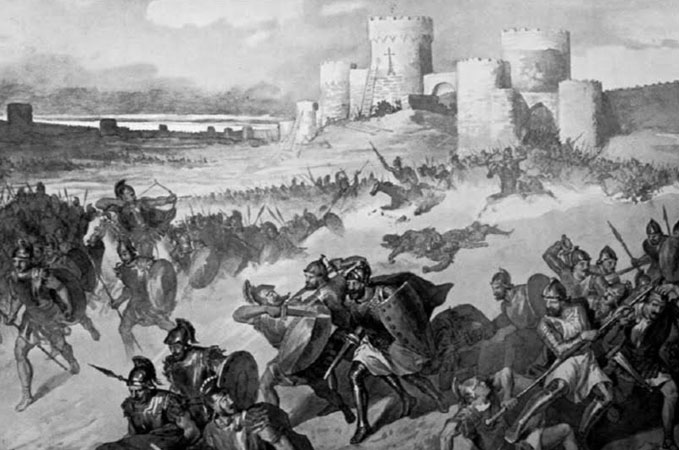
- Armenians defeat Byzantine forces attacking Ani by Giuliano Zasso
Date	1042
Location	Ani 40.5075°N 43.5728°E
Result	Armenian victory

Belligerents
Kingdom of Armenia	Byzantine Empire

Commanders and leaders
Vahram Pahlavouni	Constantine IX

Strength
30,000	100,000

Casualties and losses
Unknown	20,000 dead

The Battle of Ani (Armenian: Անիի ճակատամարտ, romanized: Anii tschaktamart) was fought between the forces of the Kingdom of Armenia under Vahram Pahlavouni and the Byzantine Empire in 1042

Vahram had an army of 30,000 which fought against the Byzantines 100,000 troops. A battle ensued in which the Byzantines were routed with the loss of 20,000 men. The fight was so ferocious that the effusion of blood flowing into the Akhurian River is said to have coloured its waters completely red.

This victory allowed Vahram Pahlavuni along with Catholicos Petros Getadarts to crown Gagik II king of Armenia in the cathedral of Ani.

== See also ==
- Vahram Pahlavouni
- Byzantine Empire
- Byzantine Armenia

== Sources ==
- Macler, Frederic (1923). "Armenia". In Tanner, J.R.; Previte-Orton, C.W.; Brooke, Z.N. (eds.). The Cambridge Medieval History. Vol. IV :The Eastern Roman Empire (717-1453). Cambridge at the University Press. pp. 153–182.
- Palakʻean, Grigoris (2019). The Ruins of Ani: A Journey to Armenia's Medieval Capital and Its Legacy. Rutgers University Press.
