= Vahram Pahlavouni =

- Վահրամ Պահլաւունի
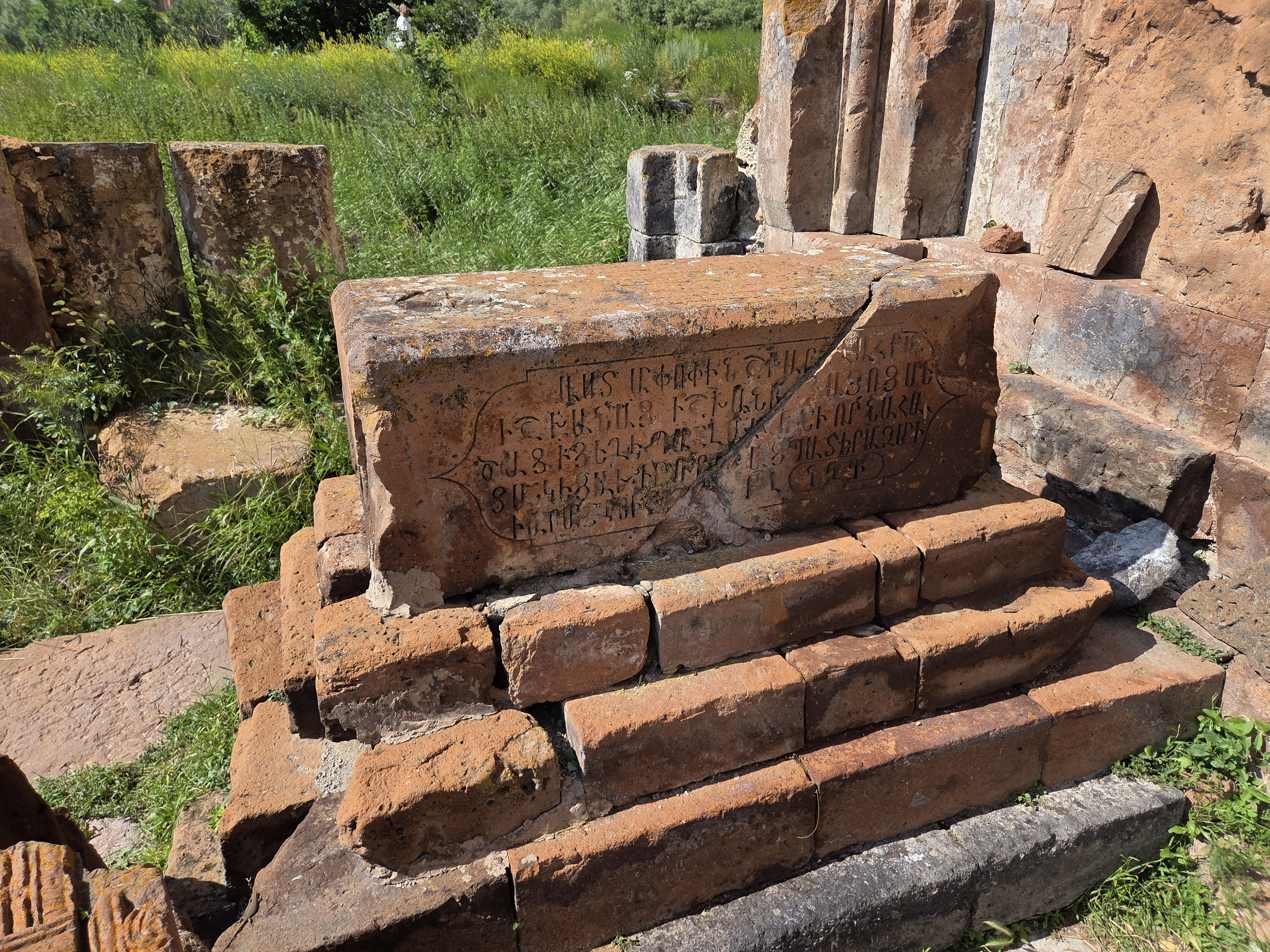
- Born: c. 965
- Died: 1046 (aged 80–81)
- Burial place: Marmashen Monastery; 40.842689°N 43.755781°E
- Children: Grigory
- Military career
- Allegiance: Bagratid Armenia
- Rank: Sparapet
- Conflicts: Battle of Ani

Vahram Pahlavuni (Old Armenian: Վահրամ Պահլաւունի, romanized: Vahram Pahlawuni; d. 1046) was an Armenian military commander and official in Bagratuni Armenia. He was the head of the noble family of Pahlavuni, who held the hereditary title of sparapet (general-in-chief) in the Bagratuni kingdom of Armenia.

== Biography ==
Vahram Pahlavuni was the son of Grigor Pahlavuni (called Grigor Hamze) and his wife Shushan. He occupied various high-ranking positions in the Bagratuni court, bearing the title išxanac῾ išxan ("prince of princes") from the 980s to the 1020s, and later took up the hereditary title of sparapet (general-in-chief). He led the joint Georgian-Armenian forces to victory against the Sajids at the Battle of Tsumb in 998.

In 1041 Vahram Pahlavuni prepared the coronation of the successor to Smbat III, the king’s nephew Gagik II who at that time was only fourteen years old.

The Byzantine emperor was aiming to take control of Ani and its surroundings and annex them into the Empire. To that end, he began supporting the rebel Vest Sarkis, an Armenian pro-Byzantine prince and adviser of king Smbat III, who took over the city of Ani with the intention of handing it over. The princes and nobles that remained loyal to the Bagratuni dynasty, rallied around Vahram Pahlavuni and resisted three assaults of the Byzantine Army over the Kingdom of Ani, compelling the imperial forces to retreat. The Byzantines then sent a very large army through the southern part of Bagratuni Armenia and at the same time convinced the king of Caucasian Albania to attack Armenia from the east.

During a fierce battle that was fought in 1042 under the walls of the capital city of Ani, general Vahram Pahlavuni soundly defeated the Byzantine army. This victory allowed Vahram Pahlavuni along with Catholicos Petros Guedadarts to crown Gagik II as king of Armenia and subsequently take the fortress of Ani, which was in the hands of Vest Sarkis. The latter ran to the fortress of St. Mary and was eventually captured. After these victories, Vahram and the new Armenian king defeated an army of the Seljuk Turks and the security of the kingdom was temporarily restored. Nevertheless, Byzantine diplomacy, the treachery of Catholicos Petros and the young king's political mistakes led to the occupation of Ani by Byzantine troops in 1045. After this tragic event, Armenian statehood in Greater Armenia continued for a few more decades through the Armenian Kingdoms of Kars, Siunik and Lori, the former vassals of the Kingdom of Ani.

Vahram died in the autumn of 1046.

== Legacy ==
Vahram's military talent and heroic contributions were sung in Armenian literature and popular songs. Vahram built the Marmashen monastery, where he was probably buried.

== See also ==
- Bagratuni dynasty

== Bibliography ==
- Ch'amch'yants', Mik'ayel (1827). History of Armenia by Father Michael Chamich from B.C. 2247 to the Year of Christ 1780, or 1229 of the Armenian era. Vol. 2.
- Rohrbach, Paul (1898). In Turan und Armenien auf den Pfaden russischer Weltpolitik (in German). Stilke – via Google Books.
- Tournebize, François (1900). Histoire politique et religieuse de l'Arménie (in French). Vol. 1. Alphonse Picard et fils – via Google Books.
- Balasanyan, Hayk (2008). "MARMAŠENI Č̣ARTARAPETAKAN HAMALIRË EV VIMAGRERË" [The Architectural Complex of Marmashen and its Inscriptions] (PDF). Etchmiadzin (in Armenian). Mother See of Holy Etchmiadzin. pp. 118–126 – via Union Catalog of Armenian Continuing Resources.
- Mat’ewosyan, Ṙ. (1985). "VAHRAM PAHLAVOWNI". In Hambardzumyan, Viktor (ed.). Armenian Soviet Encyclopedia (in Armenian). Vol. 11. Erewan. p. 247.
