= Marmashen =

Village in Shirak, Armenia

Marmashen Մարմաշեն
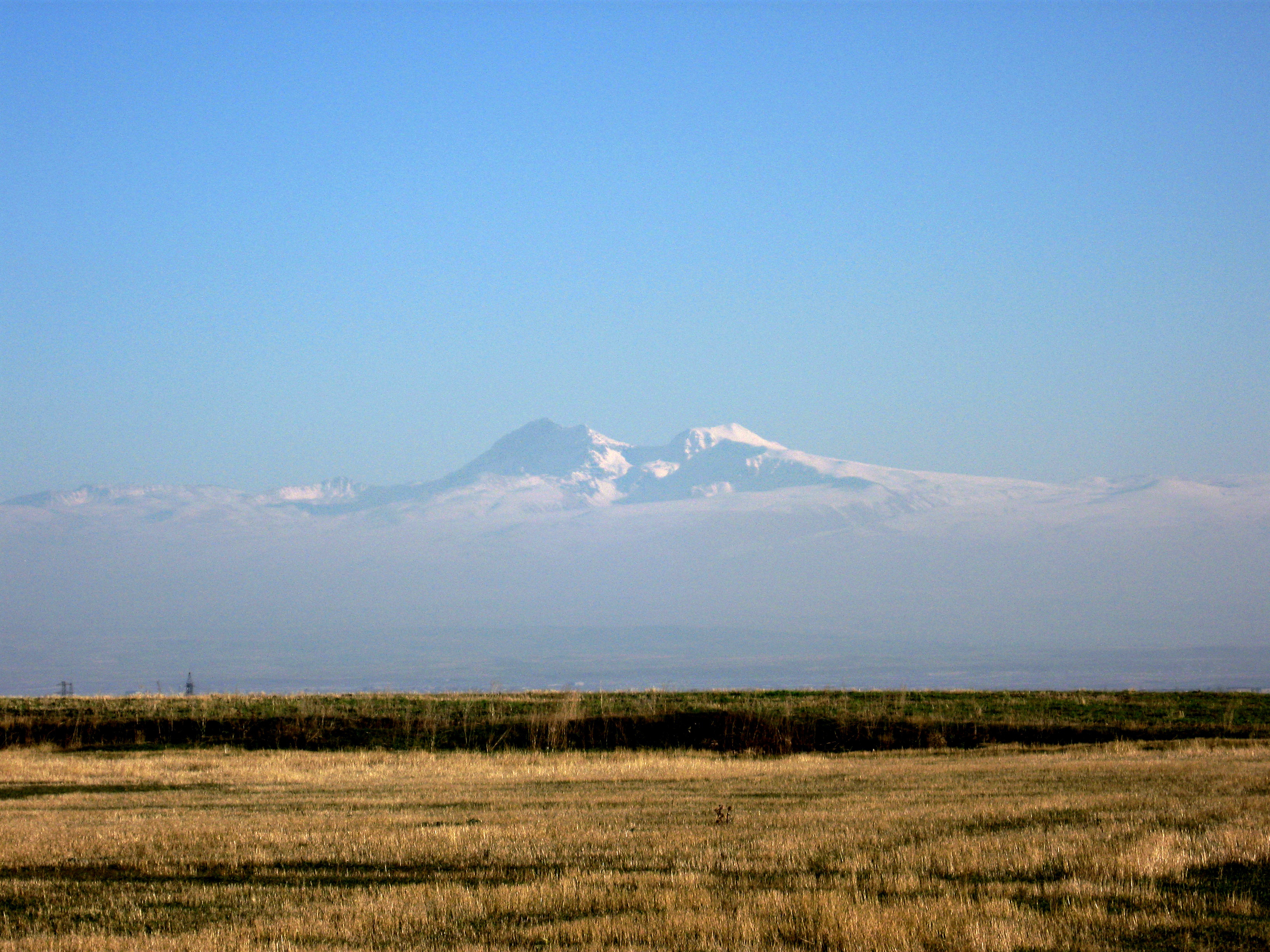
- Aragats from Marmashen

- Location within Armenia Location within Shirak
- Coordinates: 40°50′15″N 43°46′19″E
- Country: Armenia
- Province: Shirak
- Municipality: Akhuryan

Population (2011)
  - Total: 2,032
- Time zone: UTC+4
  - Summer (DST): UTC+5

Marmashen (Armenian: Մարմաշեն) is a village in the Akhuryan Municipality of the Shirak Province of Armenia.

== Demographics ==
Historical population
Year	Pop.	±% p.a.
1831	109	—
1897	396	+1.97%
1926	743	+2.19%
1939	1,066	+2.82%
1959	1,334	+1.13%
1970	1,404	+0.47%
1979	1,341	−0.51%
1989	1,727	+2.56%
2001	1,876	+0.69%
2011	2,032	+0.80%
