= Digor District =

District of Kars Province, Turkey

- District
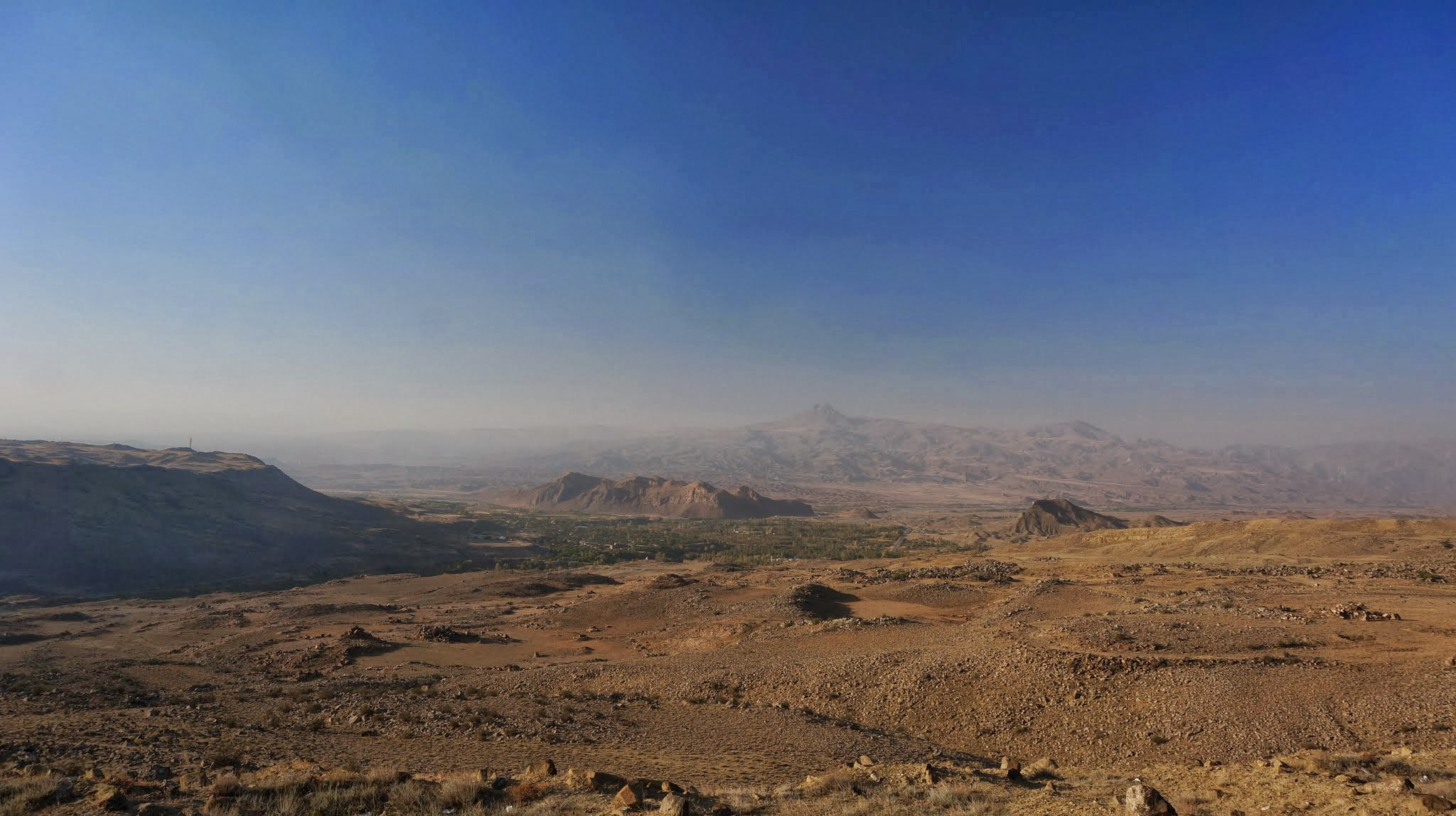
- Halıkışlak landscape, Digor

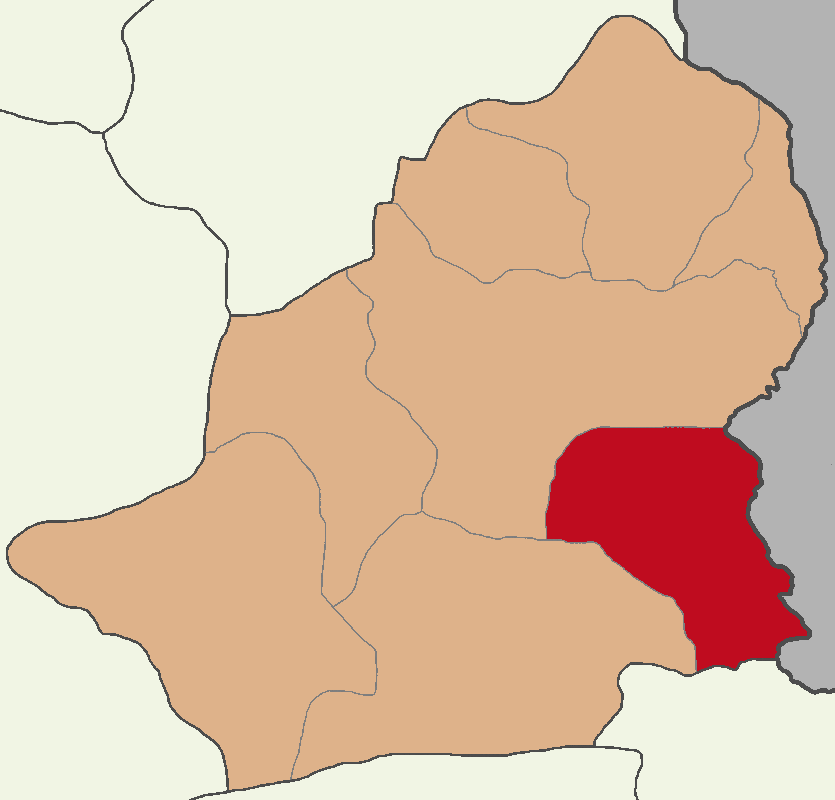
- Map showing Digor District in Kars Province

- Location within Turkey
- Coordinates: 40°23′N 43°25′E
- Country: Turkey
- Province: Kars
- Seat: Digor

Government
  - Kaymakam: Orhan Gazi Karakaş
- Area: 1,092 km^{2} (422 sq mi)
- Population (2022): 19,872
  - Density: 18.20/km^{2} (47.13/sq mi)
- Time zone: UTC+3 (TRT)
- Website: www.digor.gov.tr

Digor District is a district of the Kars Province of Turkey. Its seat is the town of Digor. Its area is 1,092 km^{2}, and its population is 19,872 (2022).

== Composition ==
There are two municipalities in Digor District:

- Dağpınar
- Digor

There are 37 villages in Digor District:

- Alem
- Arpalı
- Aşağıbaşköy
- Bacalı
- Başköy
- Bayırbağı
- Bostankale
- Çatak
- Celalköy
- Derinöz
- Dolaylı
- Düzgeçit
- Eren
- Gülhayran
- Halıkışlak
- Hasancan
- Hisarönü
- Karabağ
- Karakale
- Kilittaşı
- Kocaköy
- Köseler
- Mahirbey
- Oyuklu
- Saklıca
- Şatıroğlu
- Şenol
- Şirinköy
- Sorguçkavaklı
- Sorkunlu
- Türkmeşen
- Uzunkaya
- Varlı
- Yağlıca
- Yaylacık
- Yemençayır
- Yeniköy
