= Digor, Kars =

Digor
- Municipality
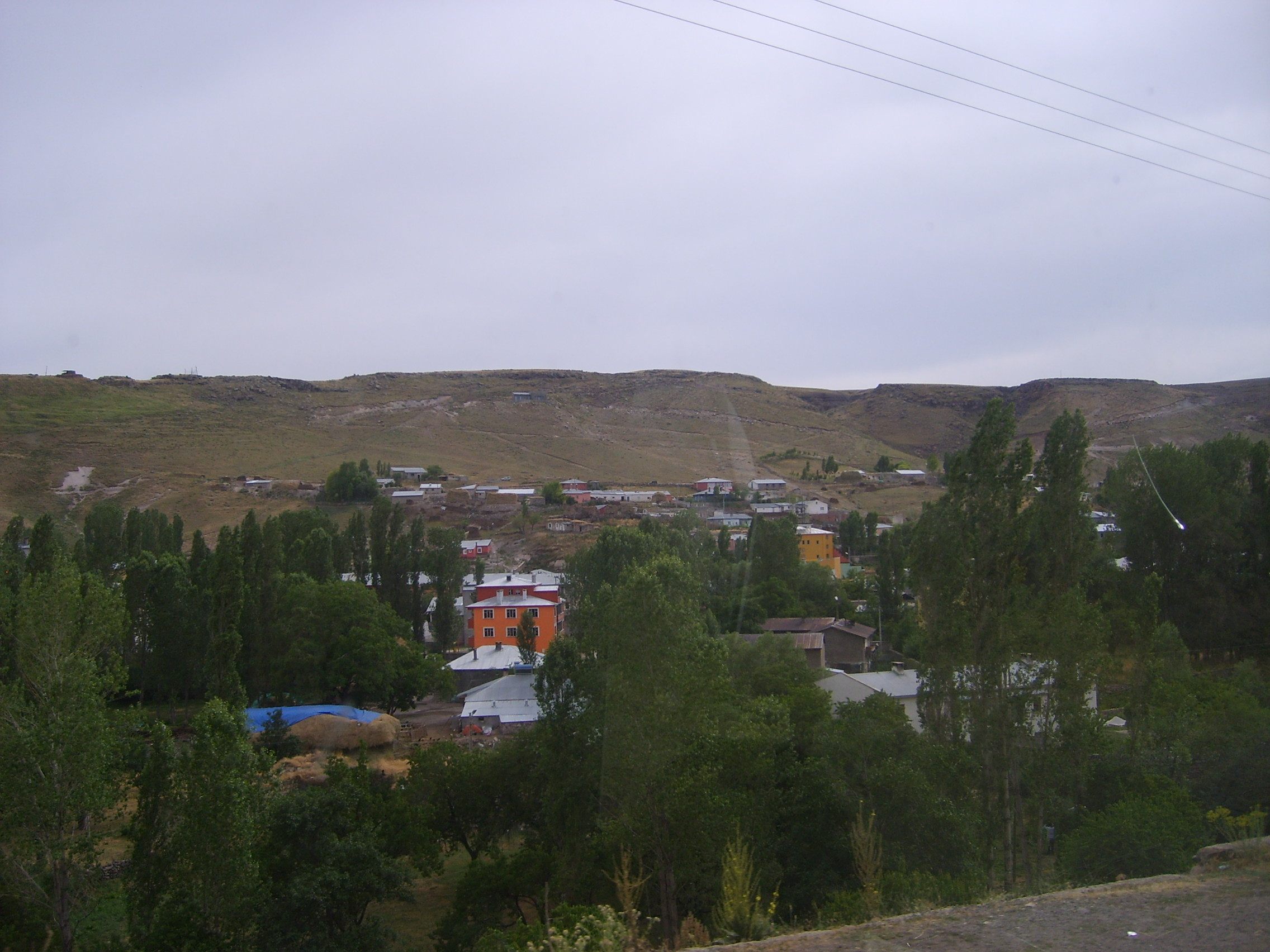
- Panoramic view of Digor

- Location within Turkey
- Coordinates: 40°22′32″N 43°24′45″E
- Country: Turkey
- Province: Kars
- District: Digor

Government
  - Mayor: Nebi Kerenciler (AKP)
- Population (2022): 2,304
- Time zone: UTC+3 (TRT)
- Postal code: 36670
- Area code: 0474
- Website: www.digor.bel.tr

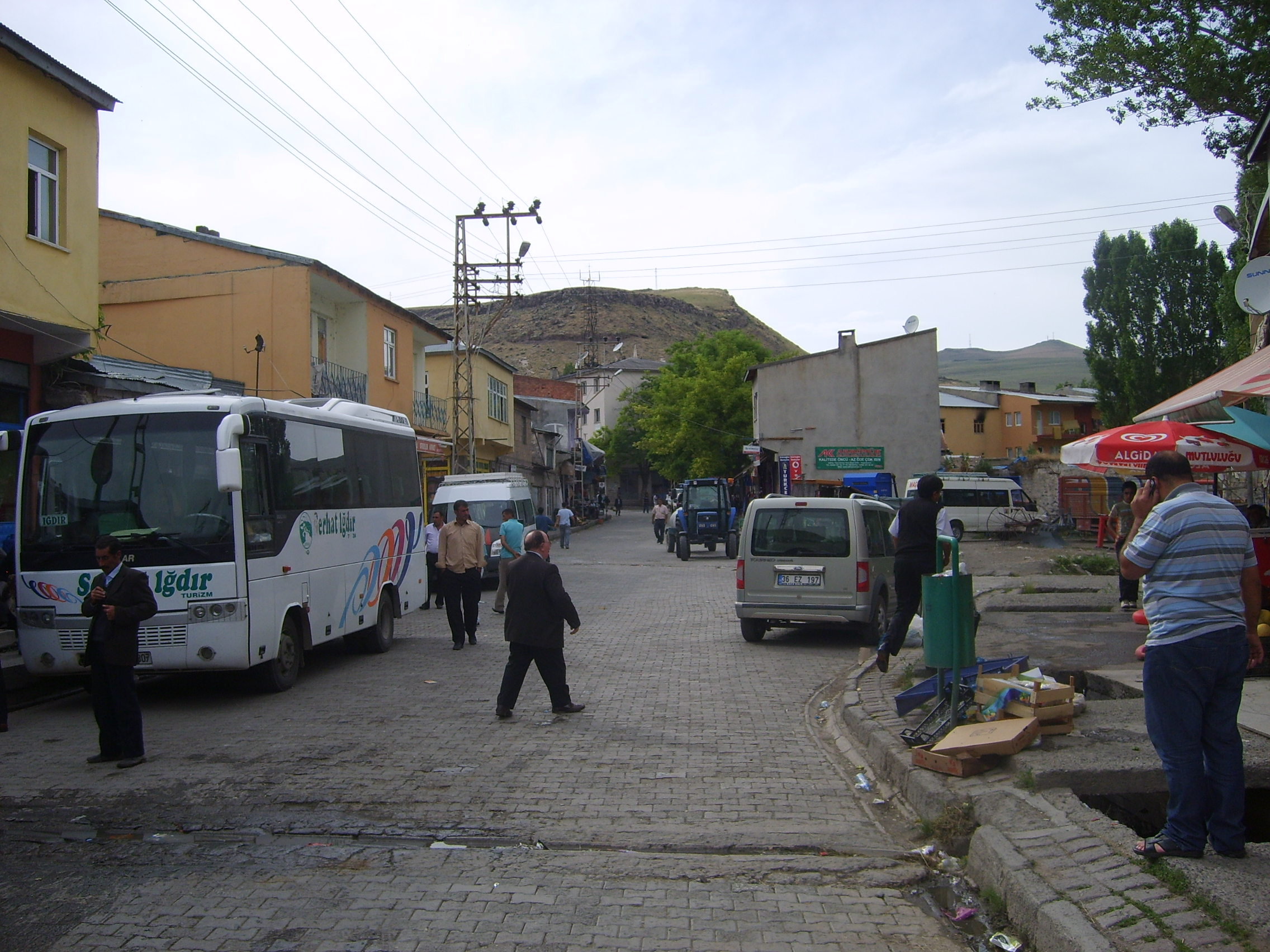
The center of Digor town

Digor (Kurdish: Dîgor, Ottoman Turkish: ديغور, Armenian: Տեկոր, romanized: Tekor) is a town in Kars Province in the Eastern Anatolia region of Turkey. It is the seat of Digor District. Its population is 2,304 (2022). The mayor is Nebi Kerenciler (AKP).

== Notable people ==
- Mahmut Alınak (b. 1952), Kurdish politician

== See also ==
- Tekor Basilica
- Digoron People
- Yazidis in Armenia
