= Stone Bridge (Kars) =

Taşköprü Taşköprü
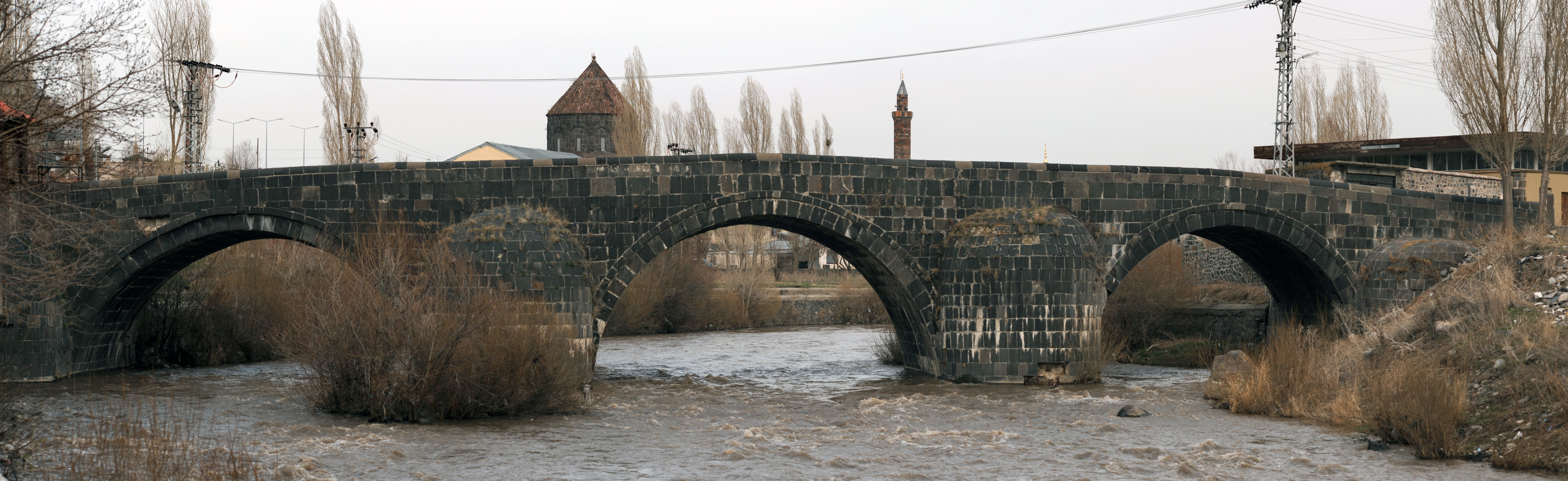
- Taşköprü seen from downstream
- Coordinates: 40°36′42″N 43°05′19″E
- Locale: Kars, Eastern Anatolia region, Turkey
- Other name: Stone Bridge

Characteristics
- Design: Arch bridge
- Material: Stone masonry
- No. of spans: 3

History
- Construction end: 1579, 1719

Taşköprü, or the Stone Bridge, is a stone three-arch bridge over the Kars River, northwest of Kars city center and directly south of the Castle of Kars. The bridge is 53.5 m long and 8.40 m wide.

The bridge was built in 1579 of ashlar basalt blocks as part of a program of works in Kars by Lala Mustafa Pasha, who became Sultan Murad III's grand vizier the following year. This bridge was subsequently destroyed by a flood, and it was rebuilt in 1719 (some records say 1725) by Karahanoğlu Haci Ebubekir Bey, one of the leaders of Kars. It was restored by the 18th Region of the Highways Directorate in 2013.
