= Cathedral of Kars =

Armenian cathedral converted into a mosque in Kars, Turkey

Kümbet Mosque
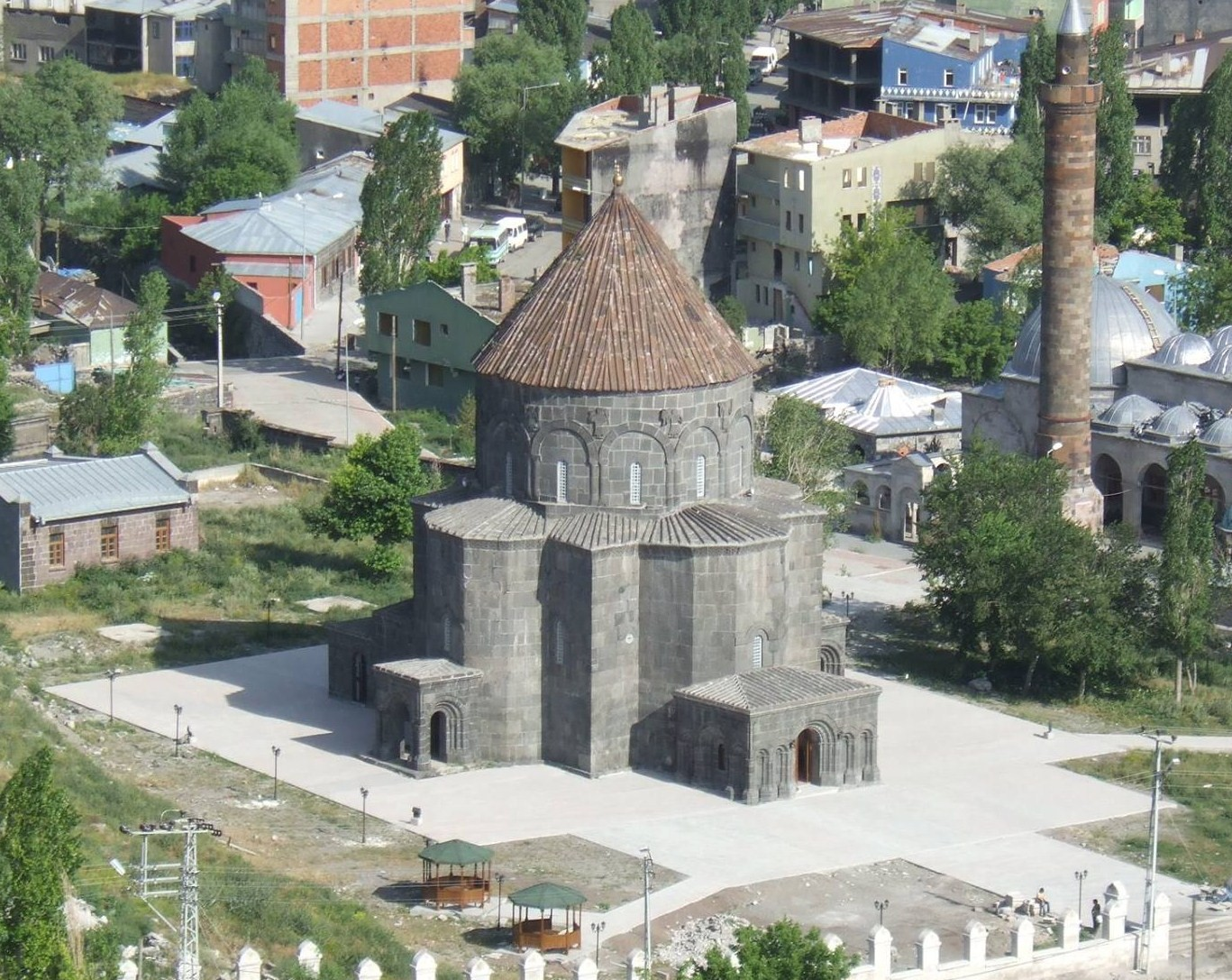
- Cathedral of Kars, in 2014

- Location within Turkey

Religion
- Affiliation: Sunni Islam
- Rite: Armenian Apostolic cathedral (930–1579); Mosque (1579–1877); Russian Orthodox cathedral (1877–1918); Armenian Apostolic church (1918–20); Mosque (1920–64); Kars Museum (1964–93); Mosque (1993–present)

Location
- Location: Kars, Turkey
- Coordinates: 40°36′40.7″N 43°05′29.2″E

Architecture
- Type: Cathedral
- Style: Armenian
- Founder: Abas I of Armenia
- Groundbreaking: 930 or 931–2
- Completed: 937, 943, or 967

The Cathedral of Kars, also known as the Holy Apostles Church (Armenian: Կարսի Սուրբ Առաքելոց եկեղեցի, Karsi Surb Arakelots' yekeghets'i; Turkish: Aziz Havariler Kilisesi or "Church of the Twelve Apostles" 12 Havariler Kilisesi) is a former Armenian Apostolic church in Kars, eastern Turkey. Built in the mid-10th century by the Armenian Bagratid King Abas I (r. 928–953), it was converted into a mosque in 1579. In the 19th and early 20th century it was converted into a Russian Orthodox and later Armenian cathedral. In 1993 it was again converted into a mosque and is called Kümbet Mosque (Turkish: Kümbet Camii, literally "domed mosque"). It currently comprises part of a larger Islamic complex that includes the Evliya Mosque, the biggest mosque in Kars.

== Overview ==
The cathedral is located at the base of the Kars Citadel.

Historians Stepanos Asoghik, Samuel of Ani, and Mkhitar of Ayrivank called the church a cathedral. In 19th century Armenian sources it began to be known as the Church of Holy Apostles.

=== Architecture ===
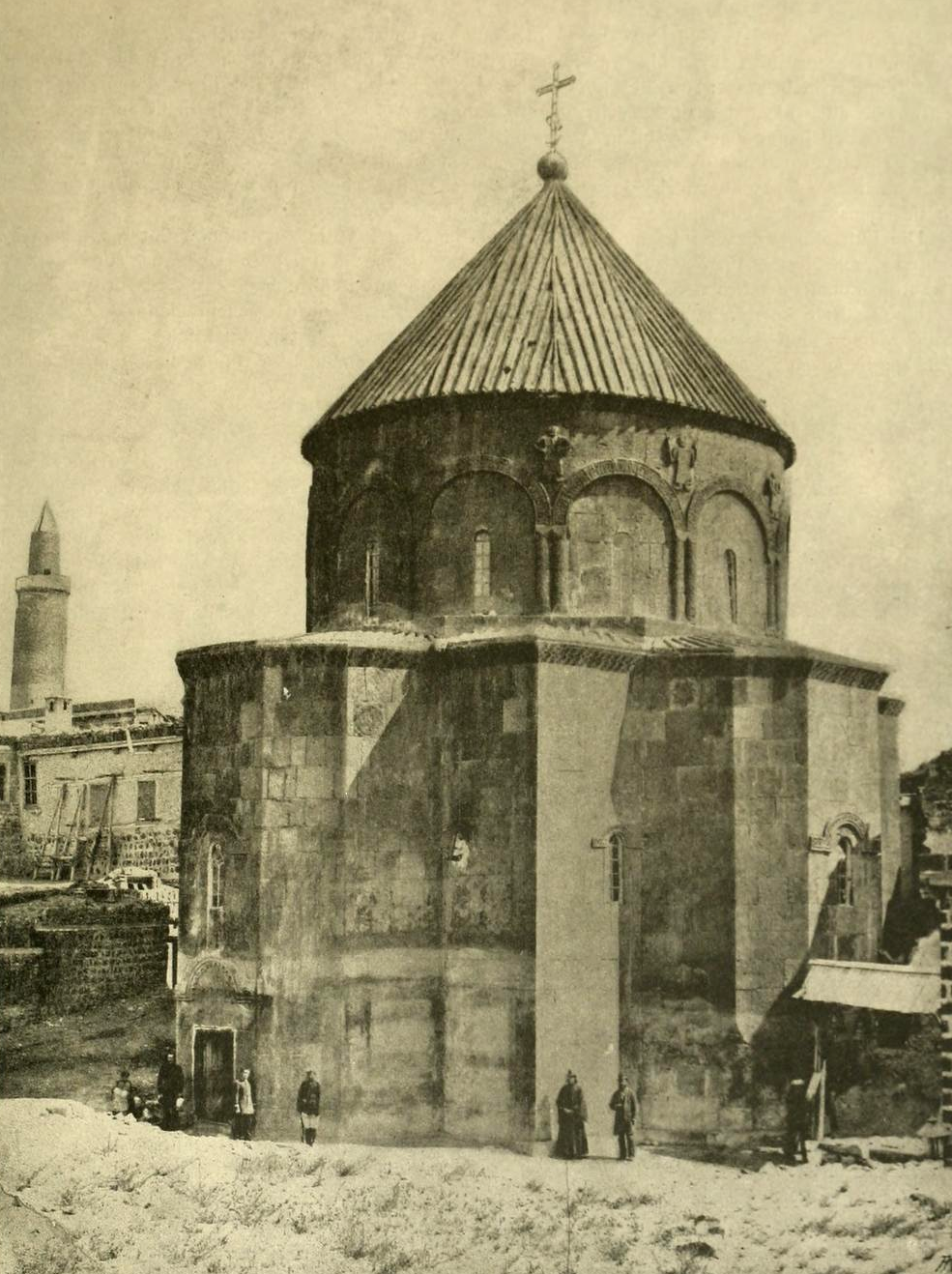
The cathedral in the early 20th century

It is a central planned domed tetraconch, and imitates the seventh-century Church of Saint John, Mastara. The main entrance of the church is on the western side also has two more gates on the south and north sides. "Its interior plan is reflected in the exterior volumes. Four apses radiate from a central square bay, over which rises a circular dome. Externally, the right angles of the square between the conchs protrude about three meters beyond the sides of the apses; inside they are represented by four dihedral angles each surmounted with a squinch."

"On the spandrels between the twelve arches on the drum there are twelve figural reliefs in standing position. These are executed in a very primitive style. According to J.M. Thierry, these figures represent the twelve apostles, whose cult was brought from Byzantium in the 10th-11th centuries."

== History ==
=== Early history ===
The church has no surviving building inscriptions and the exact dates of its foundation are unknown. Inscriptions were possibly removed in the later centuries by Muslims. However, an 11th-century source states that the cathedral was built during the reign of King Abas, who ruled Bagratid Armenia between 928 and 958. Kars served as the Bagratid capital during this period. The 11th-century historian Stepanos Asoghik wrote that king Abas "built the holy cathedral of the city of Kars with blocks of stone, with sandstone blocks that were polished with steel: [the church] was surmounted by a circular dome whose ornamentation resembled the vault of heaven", and that the cathedral was already completed at the time of Catholicos Ananias I (Anania of Mokk)'s tenure [943-967]. Chronicles Samuel of Ani (12th century) Mxit'ar of Ayrivank (13th century) give 931-932 as the beginning of the construction of the church.

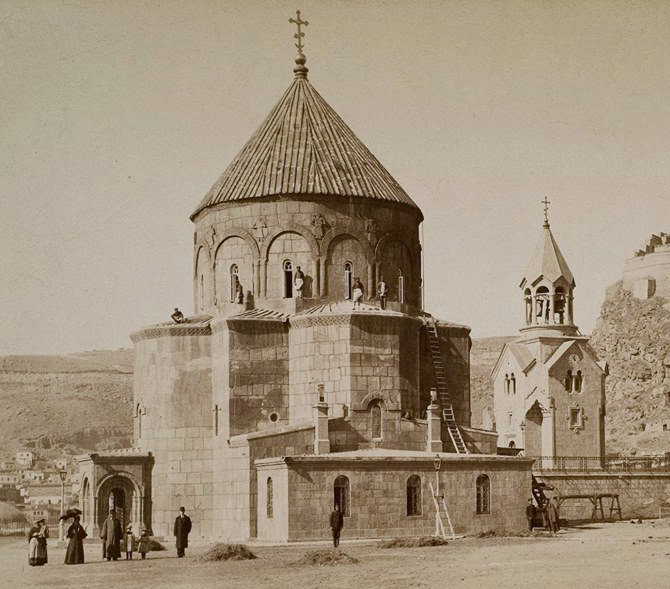
The cathedral in the late 19th century with a (Russian) Orthodox cross at the top.

=== Abandonment and conversion into a mosque ===
The church was probably abandoned after the Seljuks conquered Kars in 1064/5. It is believed that the church was "partially covered with earth" during the Middle Ages.

Following the conquest of large parts of Armenia, including Kars, by the Ottoman Empire in the 16th century the church was converted into a mosque in 1579 by Mustafa Pasha. The Suleyman Efendi mosque mentioned by the 17th century Turkish traveler Evliya Çelebi is assumed to be the Kars cathedral.

=== 19th & early 20th century ===
After the Russian capture of Kars in 1877 it was converted to a Russian Orthodox church. "Porticos were built in front of the west, north and south portals, whose original structure was destroyed. A sacristy was erected on the east side which covered the entire façade, and inside an iconostasis was built."

During the later stages of World War I's Caucasus Campaign, following the October Revolution and the civil war, the Russian troops abandoned the Caucasus en masse. In April 1918 the Turks captured Kars and the church was again converted into a mosque. According to the Armistice of Mudros, the Turks were required to withdraw to the pre-war frontier. The Republic of Armenia gained control of the city in 1919 and the church was converted back to an Armenian church.

=== Since 1920 ===
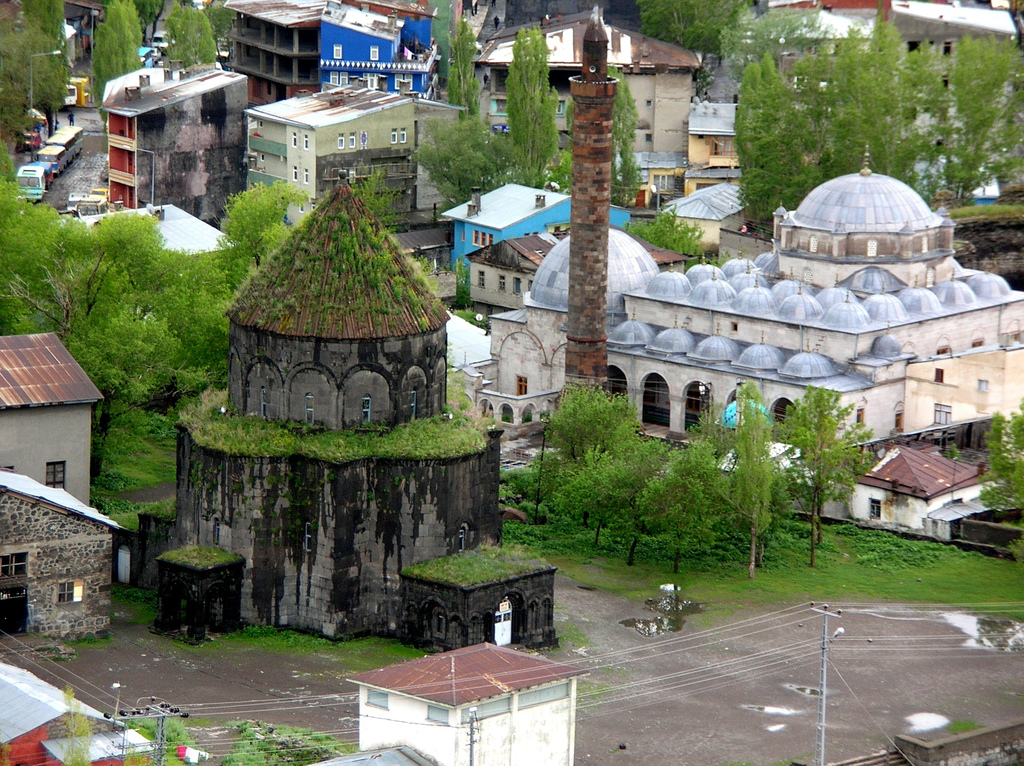
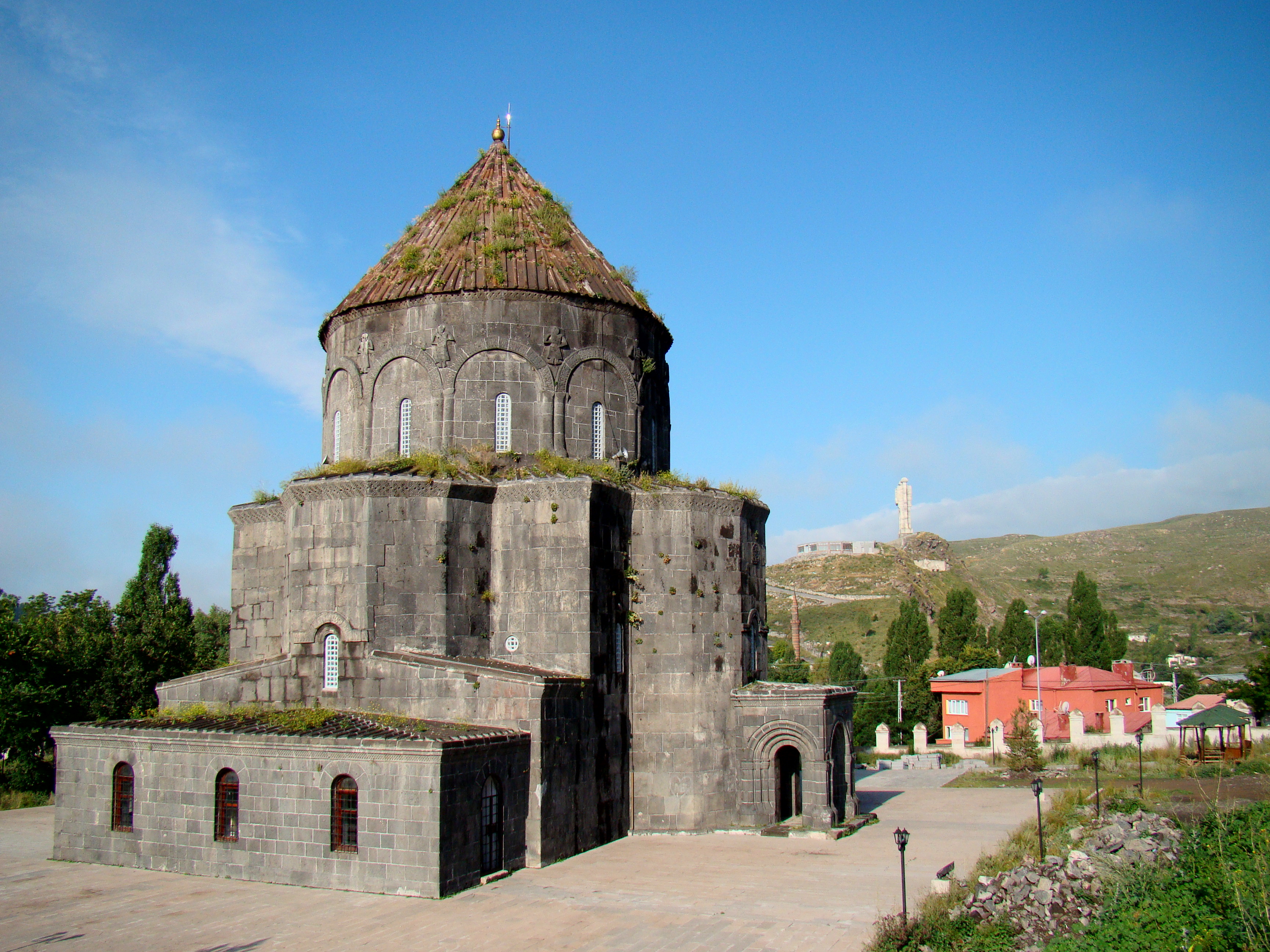
Left: View of the cathedral from the fortress in February 2006. The buildings to the left of the cathedral have since been demolished. Right: The church in August 2009.

In 1920 Kars again captured by Turkey during the Turkish–Armenian War. The cathedral ceased to function as a church and briefly operated as a mosque "but soon thereafter the Kemalist government put it up for sale. The municipality of Kars bought it and planned to demolish it to build a school on its site, but the plan was never carried out. In the 1950s the municipality used it for a depot for petroleum."

It functioned as Kars Museum between 1964 and 1993. After the museum moved to a new site, the monument lay derelict until 1993 when it was converted to a mosque under the name Kümbet Mosque and handed over to the Presidency of Religious Affairs. The Economist cited its reopening as a mosque as an example of eradication of the Armenian cultural heritage in Turkey. According to S. Peter Cowe, as of 1998, "the original high Armenian bema with the tall 19th century Russian iconostasis [were] still in place."

In a 2005 interview Kars Mayor Naif Alibeyoğlu (tur) stated about plans to restore the cathedral and added that after renovation a "cultural center or museum would be much more appropriate."

On July 22, 2022 Turkish President Recep Tayyip Erdoğan posted a picture of the mosque on his Instagram page with the caption "hayırlı cumalar" (have a good Friday).

== See also ==
- Armenians of Kars
