= Taşköprü =

Taşköprü (from the Turkish, for "Stone bridge") may refer to:

== Places ==
- Taşköprü, Düzce
- Taşköprü, Kastamonu, a district in Kastamonu Province, Turkey
- Taşköprü, Kulp
- Taşköprü, Mustafakemalpaşa
- Taşköprü, Sultandağı, a village in Afyonkarahisar Province, Turkey
- Taşköprü, Yalova, a village in Yalova Province, Turkey

== Buildings ==
- Tashkopryu Mosque, a historic mosque in Plovdiv, Bulgaria
- Taşköprü (Adana), an Ancient Roman bridge in Adana, Turkey
- Taşköprü (Beyşehir), a historic regulator dam and bridge in Byşehir district of Konya Province, Turkey
- Taşköprü (Kars), a bridge in Kars, Turkey
- Taşköprü (Silifke), a bridge in Silifke district of Mersin Province, Turkey
