= Kars Museum =

Museum in Kars, Turkey

Coordinates: 40.6131°N 43.11°E

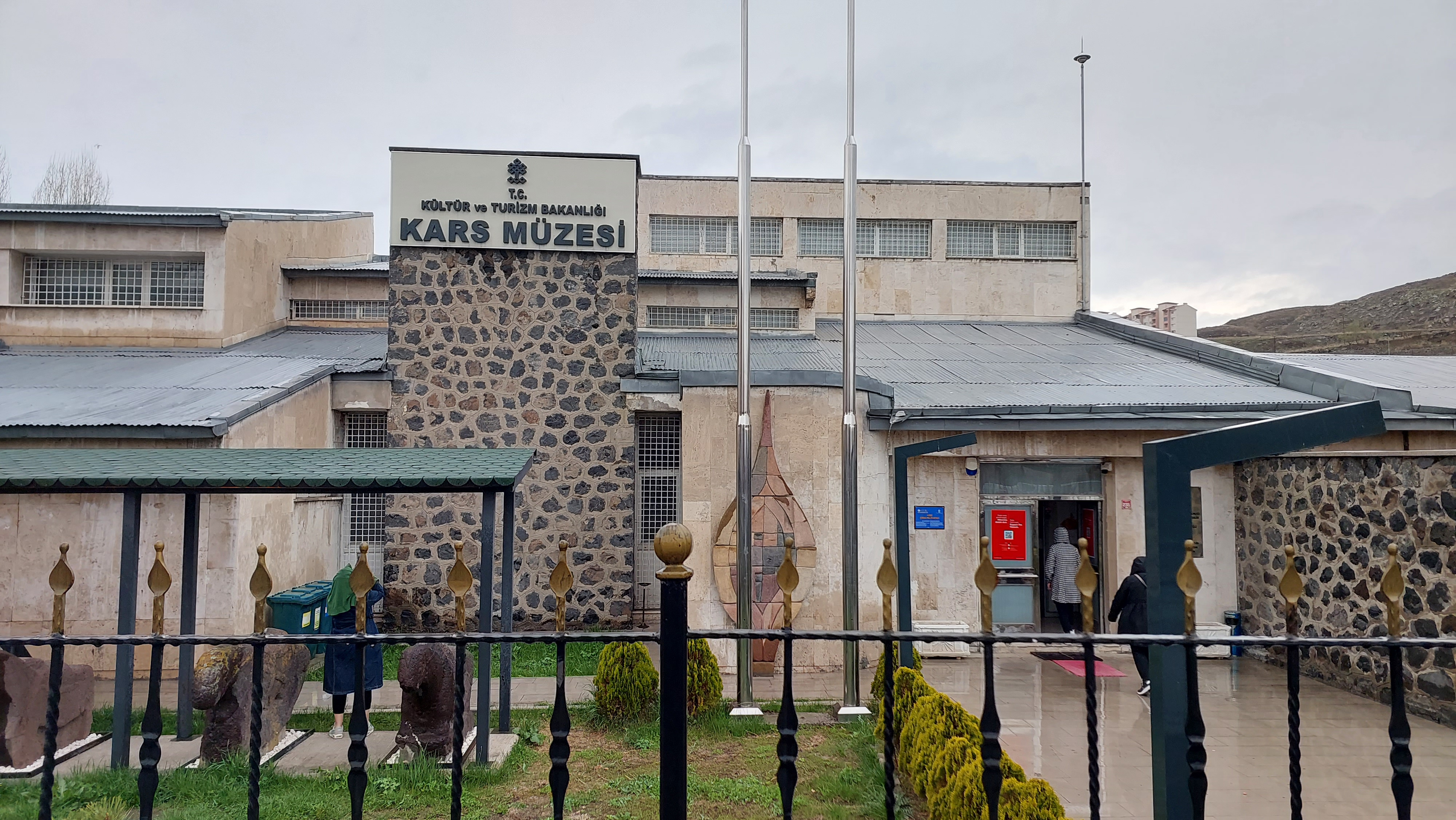
Image of Kars museum, Turkey

The Kars Museum was opened in 1963 in the Cathedral of Kars (now the Kümbet Mosque) of Kars, Turkey.

The structure was first built as an Armenian church (The Holy Apostles Church) under the Armenian Bagratuni dynasty by Abbas in 930–937. In 1579, it was converted to a mosque. Archaeological works from Kars and its surrounding region, as well as objects uncovered by the excavations of the medieval Armenian city of Ani were gathered here. After the new museum building was completed the works were moved and exhibited there.

The new museum in Kars can be found in a road which forks off the road to Ani in the northeast of the town. Finds from the Bronze Age to the present day are on display. An annex also houses an ethnography department.

== See also ==
- Cathedral of Kars
