= Battle of Kars (1877) =

1877 Russian victory over the Ottoman Empire

- Part of the Russo-Turkish War (1877–1878)
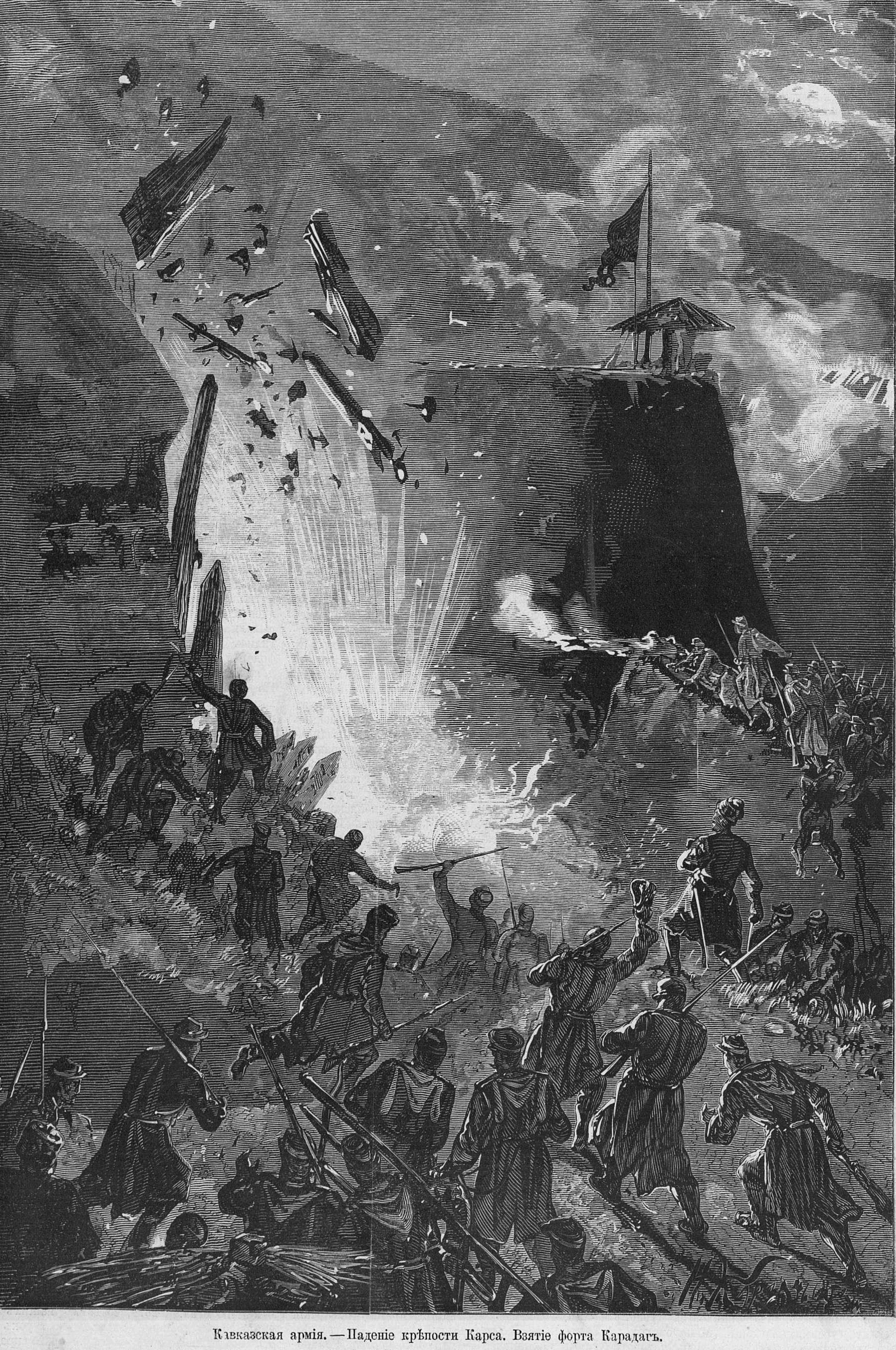
- Capture of Kars by Nikolay Karazin, 1877
Date	17 November 1877
Location	Kars, Ottoman Empire
Result	Russian victory

Belligerents
Russian Empire: Kuban Cossacks	Ottoman Empire

Commanders and leaders
Count Mikhail Loris-Melikov; Ivan Lazarev; Mihail Pavloviç Grabbe †	Ahmed Muhtar Pasha

Strength
30,000 infantry, 144 guns	18,000 infantry, 5,000 artillery

Casualties and losses
2,196 total casualties; 470 dead; 1,726 wounded	19,500 total casualties; 2,500 killed; 17,000 captured

The Battle of Kars was a Russian victory over the Ottoman Empire during the Russo-Turkish War (1877–1878). The battle for the city took place on November 17, 1877, and resulted in the Russians capturing the city along with a large portion of the Ottoman forces defending the city. Although the actual battle for the city lasted a single night, fighting for the city began in the summer of that year. The idea of taking the city was considered impossible by some in Russian high command and many soldiers, who thought it would lead to needlessly high Russian casualties without any hopes of success due to the strength of the Ottoman position. Loris Melikov and others among the Russian command, however, devised a plan of attack that saw Russian forces conquer the city after a night of long and hard fighting. The Ottoman defeat at Kars had widespread consequences regionally, and the city was formally annexed at the Treaty of Berlin.

== Battles in the build up to the attack ==
The start to the successful Russian attack of the city of Kars began in early October with fighting in the surrounding areas around Kars. Fighting in October 1877 began with the Russians advancing on the hills of Little Yahni on October 2, and Great Yahni on October 3. Although the Russians experienced success in regards to Great Yahni, the Ottoman forces garrisoning Little Yahni were putting up a fierce resistance, and by October 4, General Loris Melikov called off his attack of the hill. Despite their success on Great Yahni, the Russians had already suffered 5,000 casualties and their soldiers were exhausted after near constant fighting and marching for two to three days straight. At this point, the Ottoman army had amassed nearly 5,000 casualties. For a short period there was peace on the front, with the Turkish forces retreating to the fortified positions of Alaca-Dag on the 8th. By the 14th of October, fighting had resumed with the commence of a Russian flanking maneuver led by General Lazarev. He fielded as much as 11,000 men for the attack, including 2,500 sabres and 72 guns, in opposition to about 10,000 Ottoman men tasked with the defense of a frontline spanning nearly 15 miles long. The result of the battle was the rout of Ahmet Muhtar’s army on the 15th. The Ottoman general amassed 6,000 casualties in comparison to the 1,500 casualties the Russians suffered.

== The storming of Kars ==
After the successes in the battles in the area surrounding the city, the Russian high command began their plans for the attack on the city of Kars. The Ottoman garrison guarding the city consisted of 18,000 infantry as well as 5,000 artillery. The Russian army, on the other hand, involved 30,000 infantry and 144 guns in the attack. Despite the numerical superiority, French attaché General de Courcy, who was advising the Russians, declared the fortress impregnable and that any attack would lead to countless Russian casualties. His opinion was shared by many in the high command as well as the majority of the troops. The city was well defended, and an all-out assault would likely lead to enormous Russian casualties as General de Courcy suggested. The Russian high command, however, planned a night attack that involved careful preparation for two weeks prior and simultaneous attacks along a stretched enemy line. The first part the Russian attack was a heavy bombardment of the cities defenses and suburbs in the weeks leading up to the actual assault, with the goal of demoralizing the civilian population that already yearned for capitulation. The Russians began their assault on the city at 9 pm on November 17 with simultaneous attacks on several points along the city. The complete surprise of the attack, as well as the demoralized and under equipped Ottoman forces defending the city, meant that after intense fighting throughout the night, the city fell the next day. The Russians captured 17,000 prisoners, with 4,500 of those being sick and wounded in the hospitals. The Ottoman fighting forces additionally lost 2,500 soldiers, and the Russians amassed 2,196 casualties.

== Aftermath of the Battle of Kars ==
The Russian success at the Battle of Kars largely wrapped up the Caucasian front of the Russo-Turkish war of 1877-1878. The city, along with surrounding territory governed by the Ottoman Empire up to that point, was ceded to the Russian empire after the Treaty of Berlin. The following years saw a significant amount of Armenians immigrate from the Ottoman Empire into Russian Transcaucasia, as well as Muslim Turks and Kurds immigrate from the newly annexed Russian territory into Ottoman lands.

== Legacy ==
In 1880, Russian composer Modest Mussorgsky wrote a triumphal march named "The Capture of Kars" in honor of the victory.

== Gallery ==
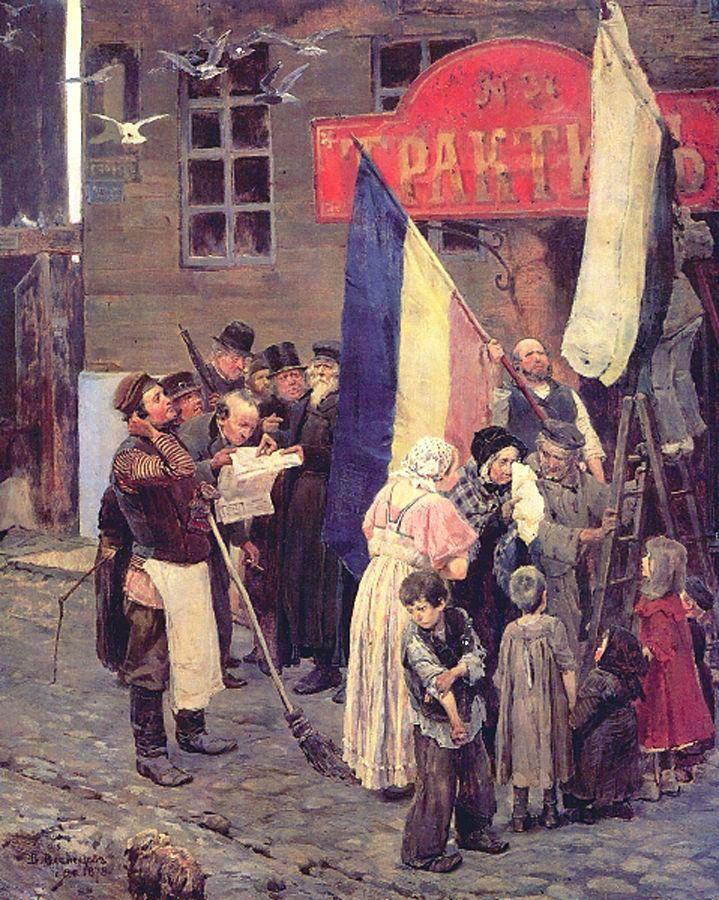
News of the capture of Kars by Viktor Vasnetsov, 1878

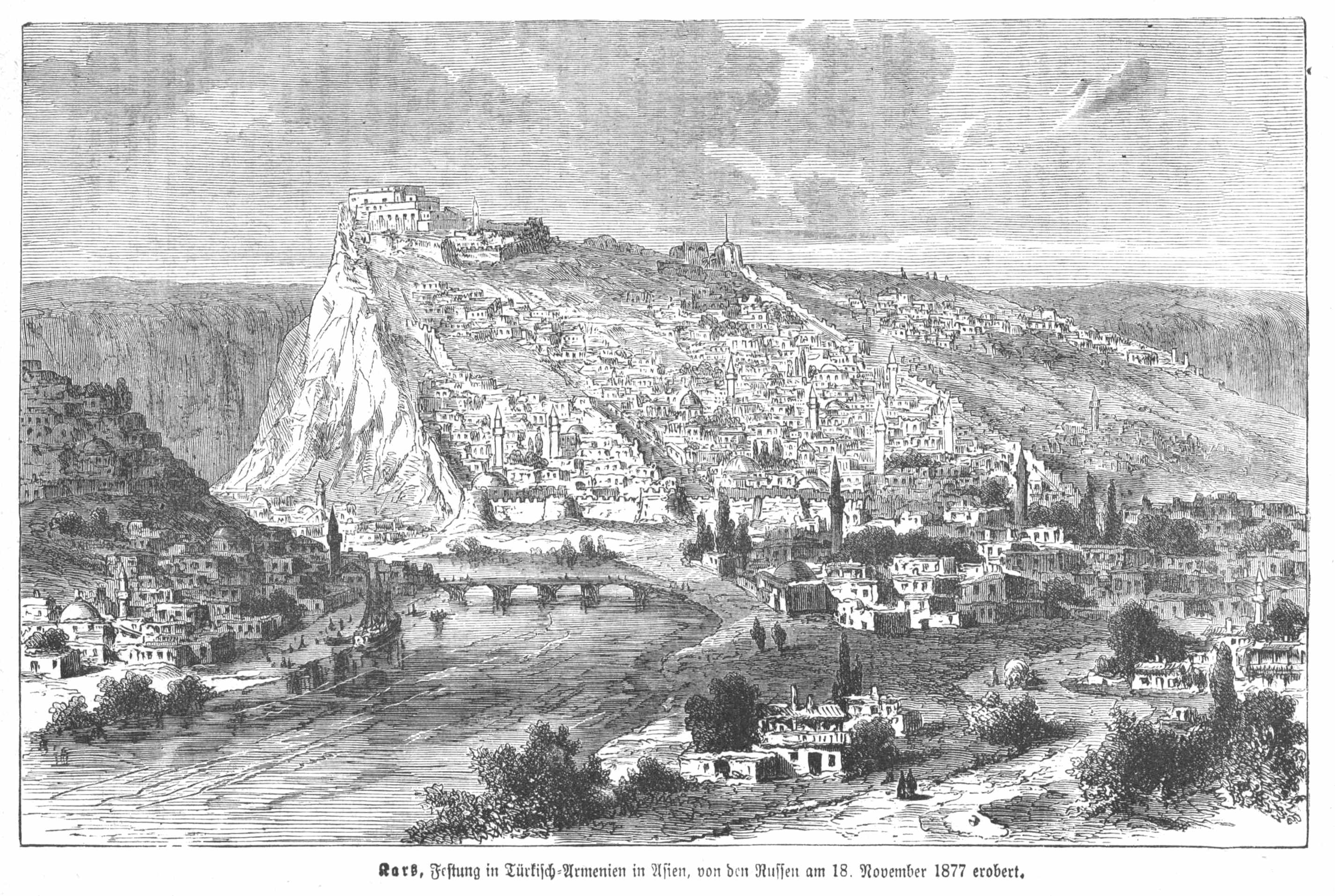
Kars in 1878

== See also ==
- Battles of the Russo-Turkish War (1877–1878)
- Castle of Kars

== Sources ==
- Compton's Home Library: Battles of the World CD-ROM
- Murray, Nicholas. “The Battle of Kars, 1877,” Conflict and Conquest in the Islamic World: An Encyclopedia, edited by Alexander Mikaberidze. Santa Barbara, CA: ABC-CLIO, 2011.
- Murray, Nicholas. The Rocky Road to the Great War: The Evolution of Trench Warfare to 1914. Potomac Books Inc. (an imprint of the University of Nebraska Press), 2013.
