= Kars =

City in Turkey

Kars Կարս Qers
- Municipality
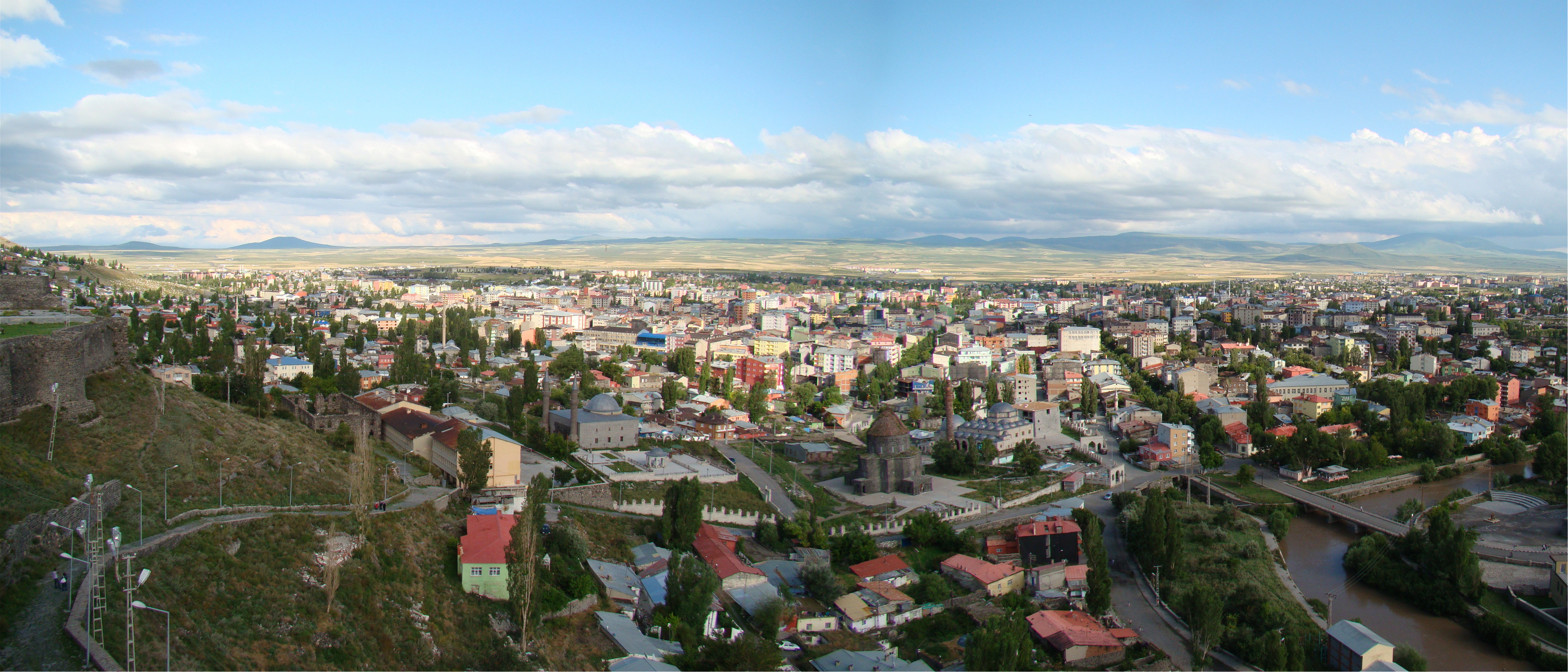
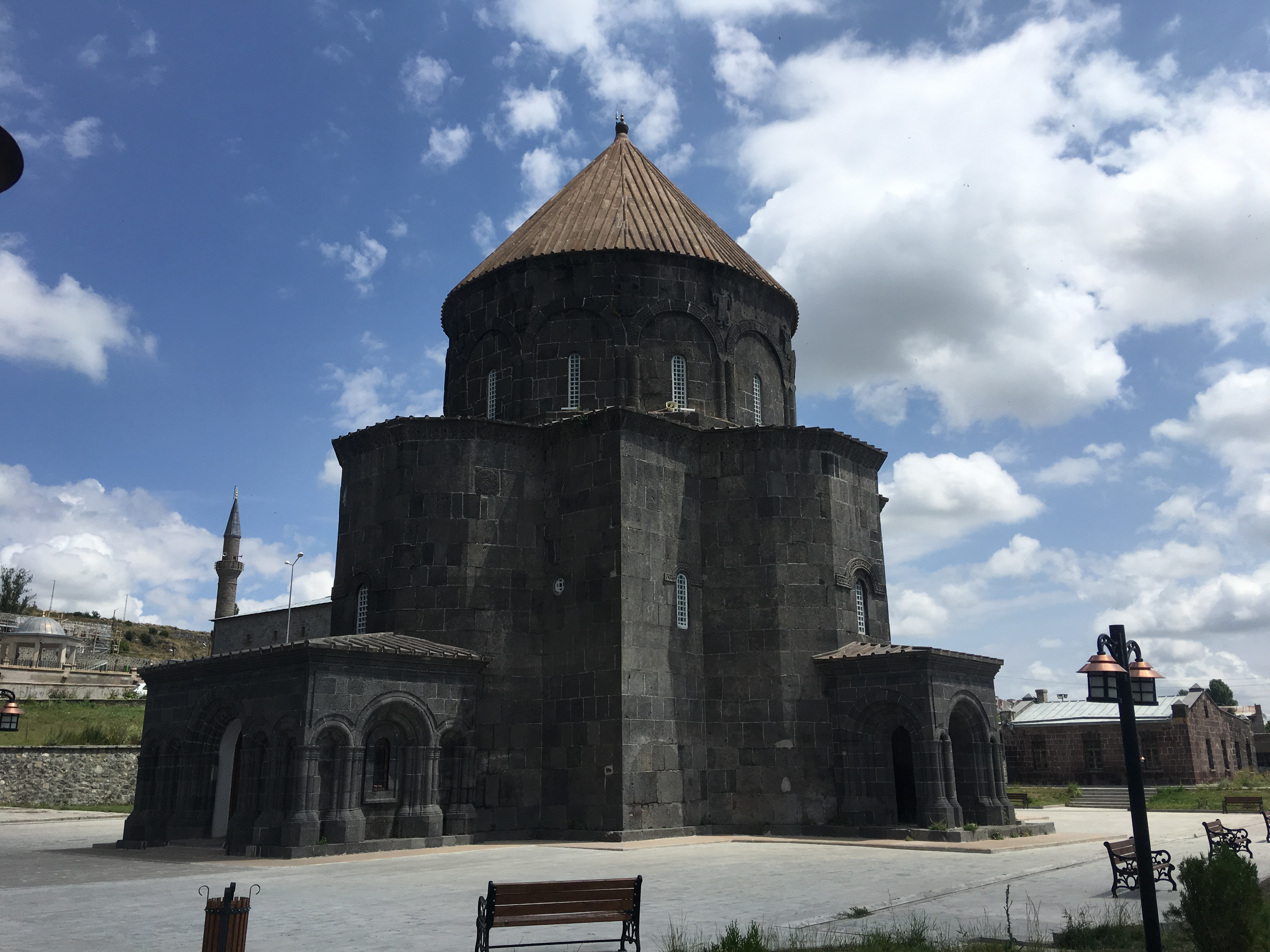
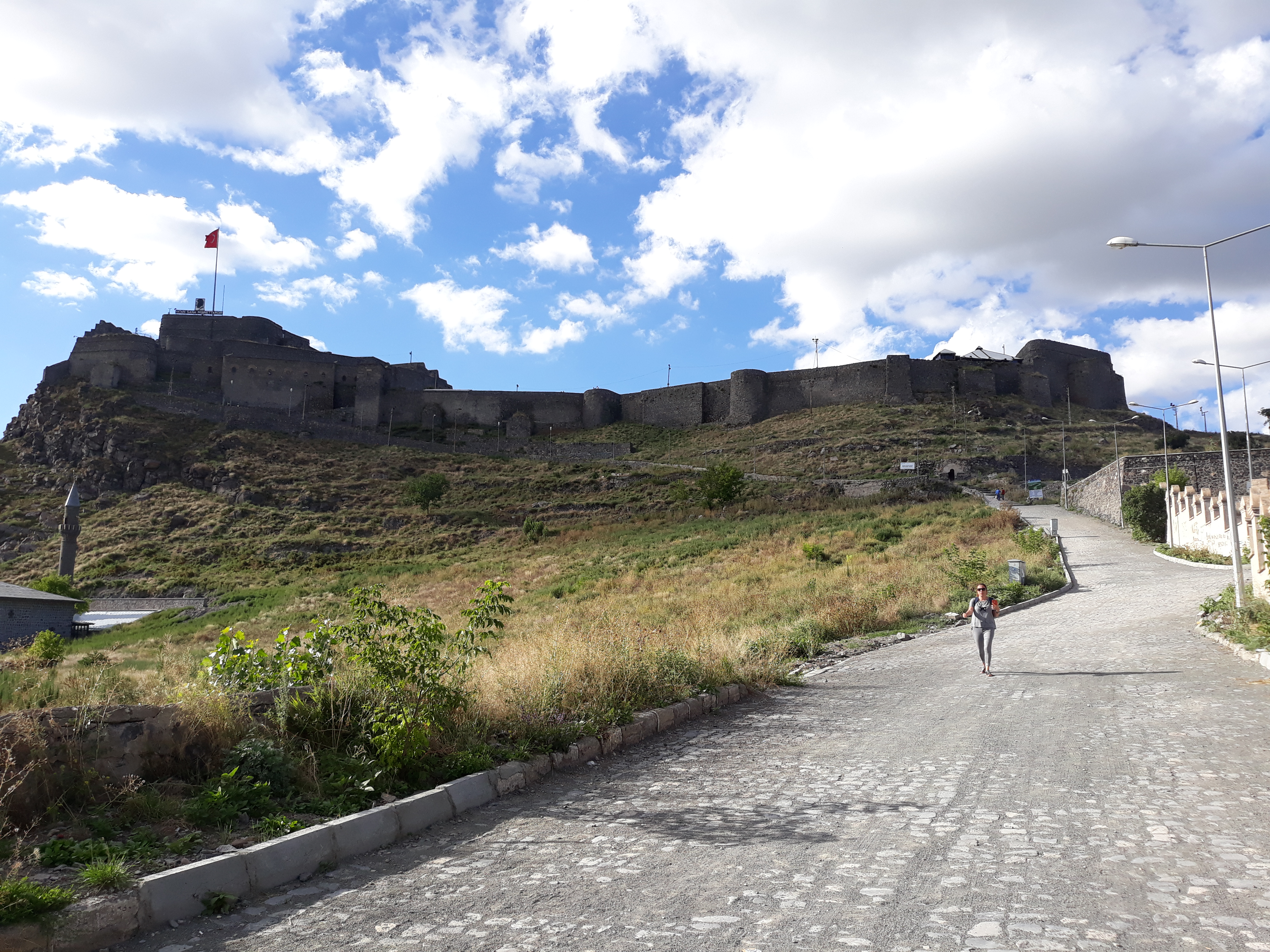
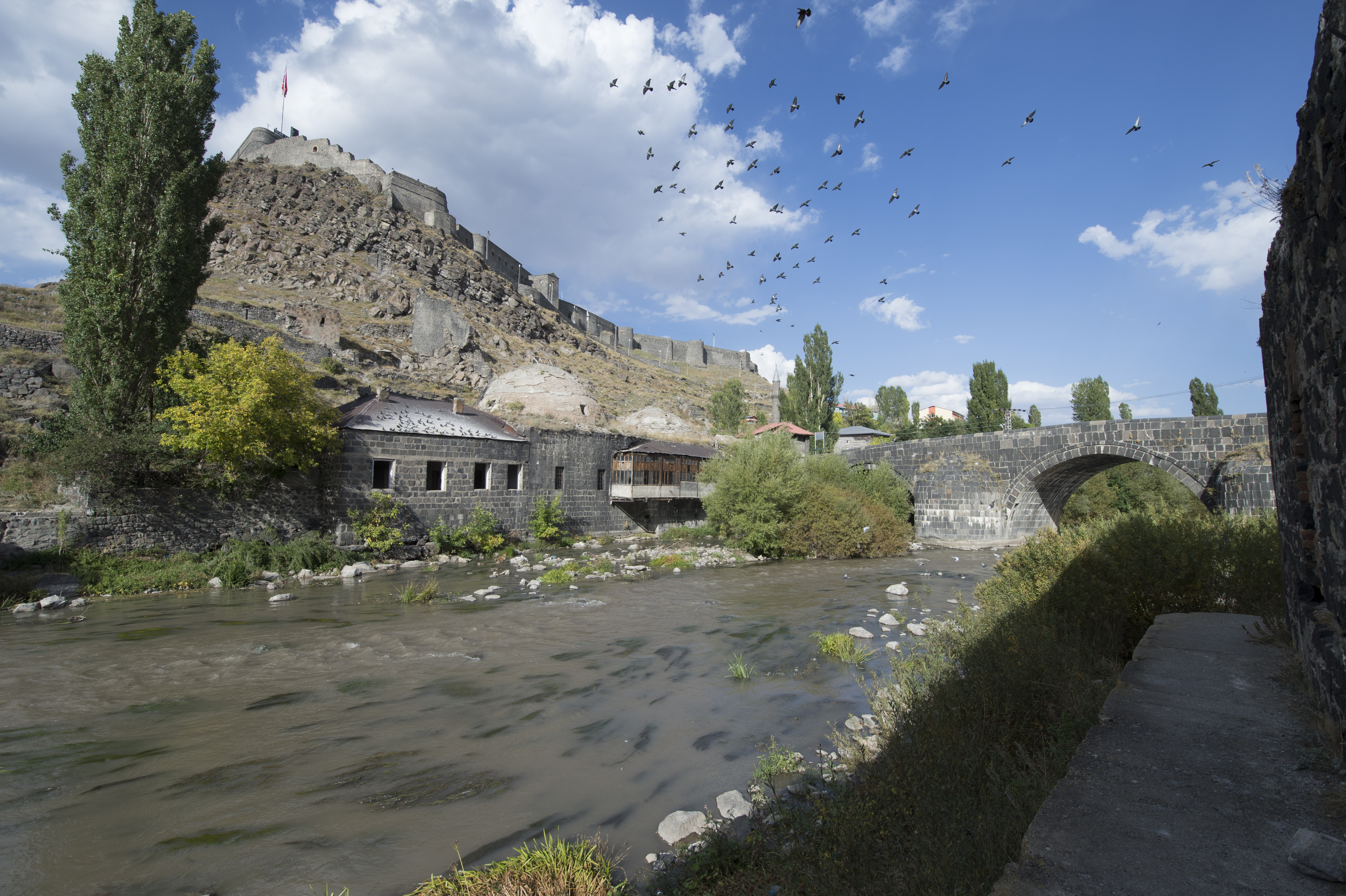
- Clockwise from top: View of Kars city centre, Castle of Kars, Panoramic view of Kars Topçuoğlu Hamam and Taşköprü, Cathedral of Kars

- Logo

- Location within Turkey
- Coordinates: 40°36′28″N 43°05′45″E
- Country: Turkey
- Province: Kars
- District: Kars

Government
  - Mayor: Ötüken Senger (MHP)
- Elevation: 1,768 m (5,801 ft)
- Population (2022): 91,450
- Time zone: UTC+3 (TRT)
- Postal code: 36000
- Area code: 0474
- Website: www.kars.bel.tr

Kars (Note: Armenian: Կարս, romanized: Kars, or Ղարս, Ghars; Azerbaijani: Qars; Kurdish: Qers; Georgian: ყარსი, romanized: q'arsi; Russian: Карс) is a city in northeast Turkey. It is the seat of Kars Province and Kars District. As of 2022, its population was 91,450. Kars, in classical historiography (Strabo), was in the ancient region known as Chorzene (Greek: Χορζηνή), part of the province of Ayrarat in the Kingdom of Armenia, and later the capital of the Bagratid kingdom of Armenia from 929 to 961. Currently, the mayor of Kars is Ötüken Senger. The city had an Armenian ethnic majority until it was recaptured by Turkish nationalist forces in late 1920.

== Etymology ==
The city's name may derive from the Armenian word hars, meaning 'bride'. According to another hypothesis, the name derives from the Georgian word kari, meaning 'gate'.

== History ==
=== Medieval period ===
Little is known of the early history of Kars beyond the fact that, during medieval times, it had its own dynasty of Armenian rulers and was the capital of a region known as Vanand. Medieval Armenian historians referred to the city by a variety of names, including Karuts’ k’aghak’ ('Kars city'), Karuts’ berd, Amrots’n Karuts’, Amurn Karuts’ (all meaning 'Kars Fortress'). At some point in the ninth century (at least by 888) it entered into the domains of the Armenian Bagratunis. Kars was the capital of the Bagratid kingdom of Armenia between 929 and 961. During this period, the town's cathedral, later known as the Church of the Holy Apostles, was built.

In 963, shortly after the Bagratuni seat was transferred to Ani, Kars became the capital of a separate independent kingdom, again called Vanand. However, the extent of its actual independence from the Kingdom of Ani is uncertain: it was always in the possession of the relatives of the rulers of Ani, and, after Ani's capture by the Byzantine Empire in 1045, the Bagratuni title "King of Kings" held by the ruler of Ani was transferred to the ruler of Kars. In 1064, just after the capture of Ani by Alp Arslan (leader of the Seljuk Turks), the Armenian king of Kars, Gagik-Abas, paid homage to the victorious Turks so that they would not lay siege to his city. In 1065 Gagik-Abas ceded his kingdom to the Byzantine Empire, but soon after Kars was taken by the Seljuk Turks.

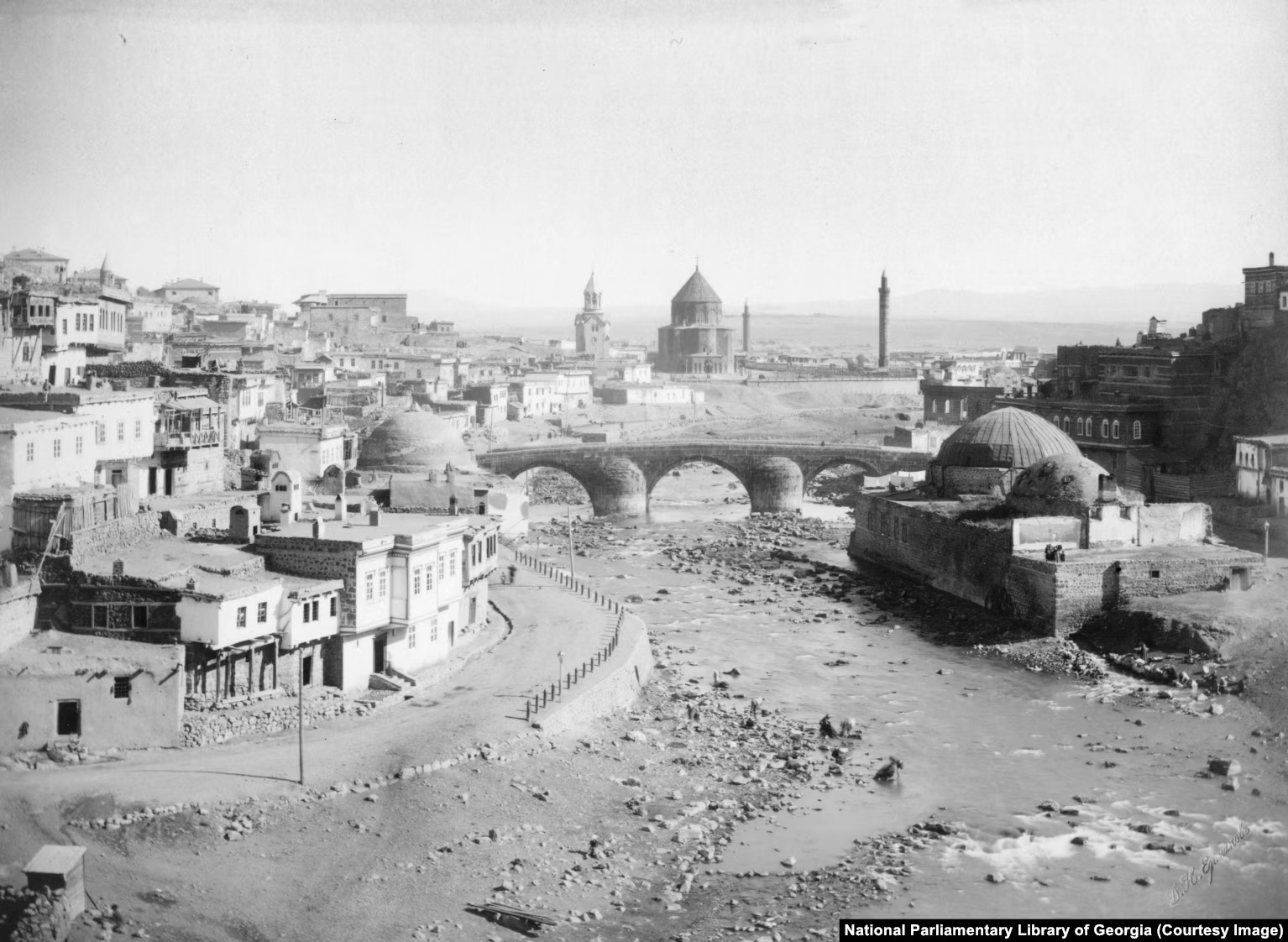
Kars by Alexander Roinashvili c. 1880.

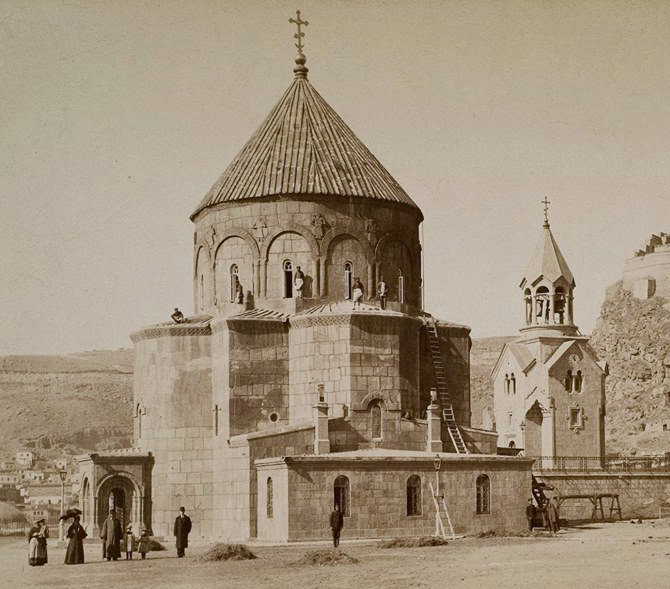
The 10th-century Armenian Church of the Holy Apostles, as seen in a photo taken in the late 19th century.

Map of the Armenian Kingdom under the reign of the Bagratid dynasty, 10-11th centuries A.D.

The Seljuks quickly relinquished direct control over Kars and it became a small emirate whose territory corresponded closely to that of Vanand, and which bordered the similarly created but larger Shaddadid emirate centered at Ani. The Kars emirate was a vassal of the Saltukids in Erzurum, whose forces were effective in opposing Georgian attempts at seizing Kars. Thus, it was only in 1206 that Zakare of the Zakarids–Mkhargrdzeli succeeded in capturing Kars, joining it to their fiefdom of Ani.

In 1242, Kars was conquered by the Mongols and later the city fell under Georgian influence. During the reign of David IX of Georgia, the Ilkhanate occupied the southern territories of the Kingdom of Georgia, which included Kars. By 1358, the city was ruled by the Jalayirids and in 1380 it fell to the Qara Qoyunlu. In 1387 the city was leveled and the surrounding countryside was devastated by Timur (Tamerlane). Anatolian beyliks followed for some time after that, until it firstly fell into the hands of the Qara Qoyunlu and subsequent Aq Qoyunlu. After the Ak Koyunlu, as it went naturally for almost all their former territories, the city fell into the hands of the newly established Safavid dynasty of Iran, founded by king Ismail I. Following the Peace of Amasya of 1555 that followed the Ottoman–Safavid War of 1533–1555, the city was declared neutral, and its existing fortress was destroyed.

In 1585, during the Ottoman–Safavid War of 1579–1590, the Ottomans took the city alongside Tabriz. On June 8, 1604, during the next bout of hostilities between the two archrivals, the Ottoman–Safavid War of 1603–1618, Safavid ruler Abbas I retook the city from the Ottomans. The fortifications of the city were rebuilt by the Ottoman Sultan Murad III and were strong enough to withstand a siege by Nader Shah of Persia, in 1731. It became the head of a sanjak in the Ottoman Erzurum vilayet. In July 1744, the city was again besieged by Nader Shah. Later, in August 1745, a huge Ottoman army was routed at Kars by Nader Shah during the Ottoman–Persian War of 1743–1746. As a result, the Turks fled westwards, raiding their own lands as they went.

=== Russian administration ===
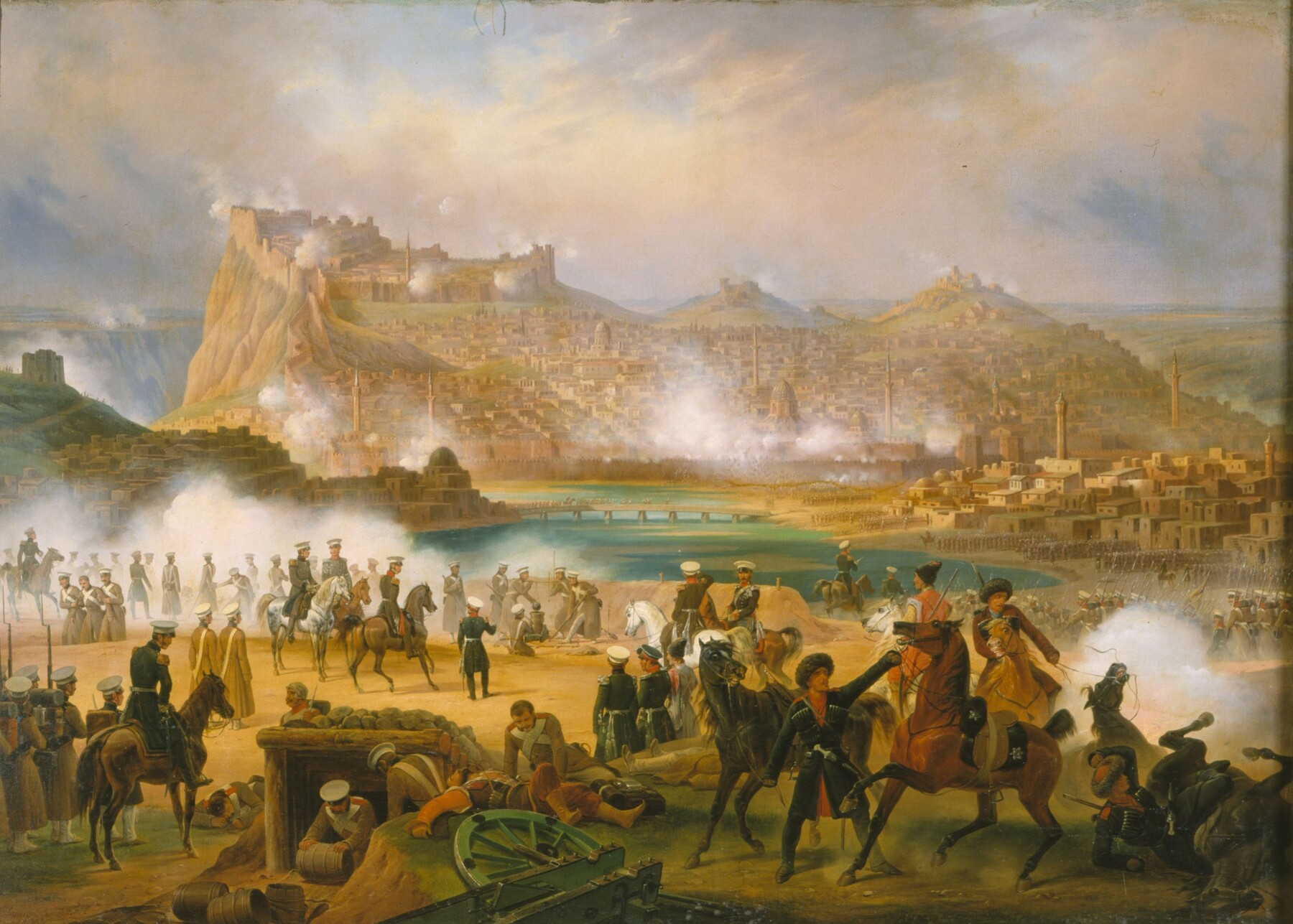
The 1828 Russian siege of Kars (painter January Suchodolski).

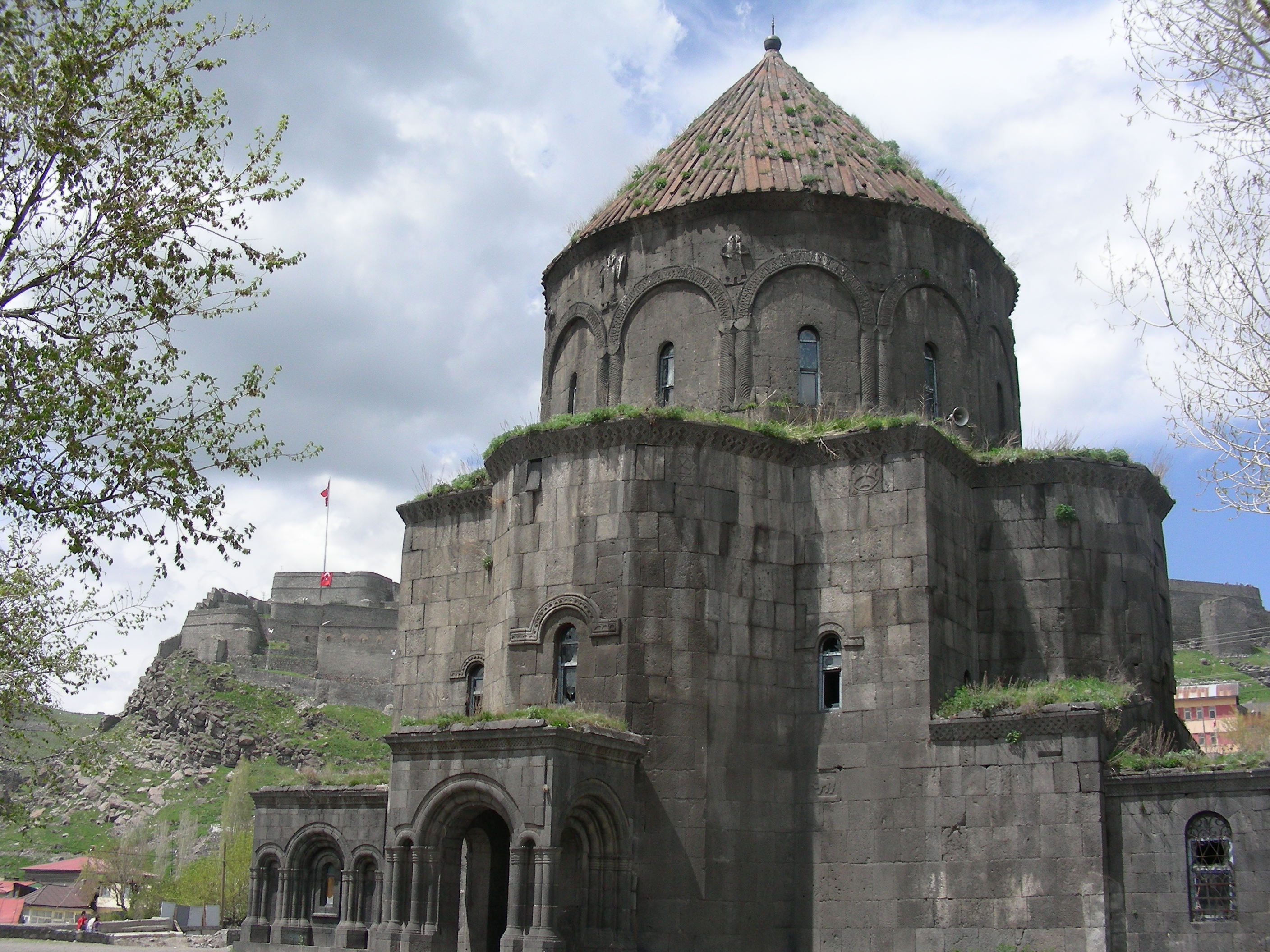
The Armenian Cathedral of Kars, which was converted into a mosque in 1993.

In 1807, Kars successfully resisted an attack by the Russian Empire. During a break between the Russian campaigns in the region conducted against the Ottomans, in 1821, commander-in-chief Abbas Mirza of Qajar Iran occupied Kars, further igniting the Ottoman–Persian War of 1821–1823. After another Russian siege in 1828 the city was surrendered by the Ottomans on 23 June 1828, to the Russian general Count Ivan Paskevich, 11,000 men becoming prisoners of war. At the end of the war it returned to Ottoman control for diplomatic reasons, Russia gaining only two border forts. During the Crimean War, an Ottoman garrison led by British officers, including General William Fenwick Williams, kept the Russians at bay during a protracted siege, but after the garrison had been devastated by cholera and food supplies were depleted, the town was surrendered to General Muravyov in November 1855.

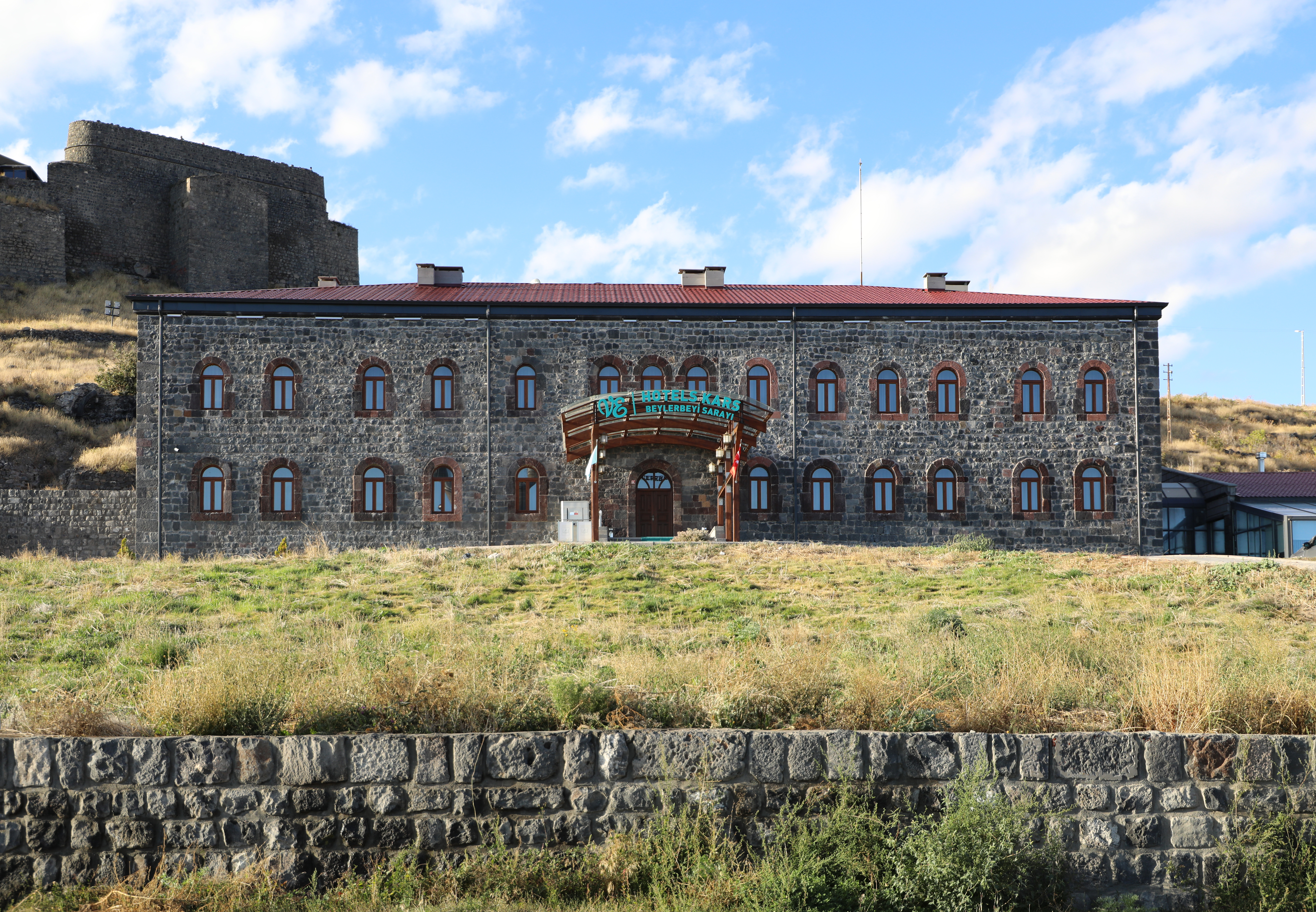
Kars, Beylerbeyi Palace.

The city's significance increased as the Ottoman Empire and Russian Empire contested its possession. The fortress was stormed by the Russians in the Battle of Kars during the Russo-Turkish War, 1877–78 under generals Loris-Melikov and Ivan Lazarev. Following the war, Kars was transferred to Russia by the Treaty of San Stefano. Kars became the capital of the Kars Okrug and larger Kars Oblast ("region"), comprising the okrugs ("districts") of Kars, Ardahan, Kagizman, and Olti, which was the most southwesterly extension of the Russian Transcaucasus. In the following years the Russians supported the fortification of Kars.

From 1878 to 1881 more than 82,000 Muslims from formerly Ottoman-controlled territory migrated to the Ottoman Empire. Among those there were more than 11,000 people from the city of Kars. At the same time, many Armenians and Pontic Greeks (here usually called Caucasus Greeks) migrated to the region from the Ottoman Empire and other regions of Transcaucasia. According to the Russian census data, by 1897 Armenians formed 49.7%, Russians 26.3%, Caucasus Greeks 11.7%, Poles 5.3% and Turks 3.8% of the city's population.

=== World War I ===
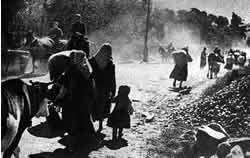
Armenian civilians fleeing Kars after its capture by Kâzım Karabekir's forces.

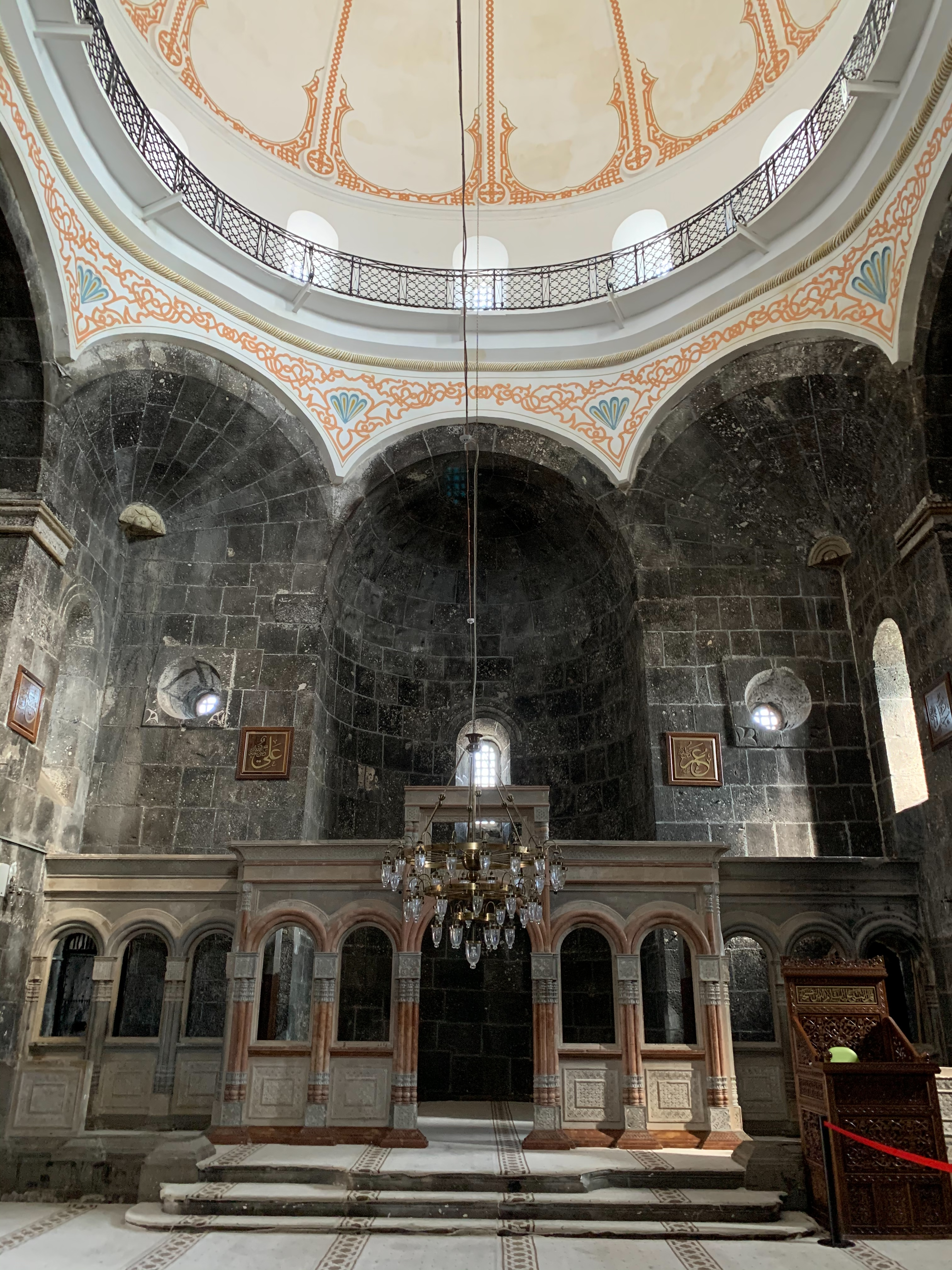
Interior of the Kars cathedral.

In the First World War, the city was one of the main objectives of the Ottoman army during the lost Battle of Sarikamish in the Caucasus Campaign. Russia ceded Kars, Ardahan and Batum to the Ottoman Empire under the Treaty of Brest-Litovsk on 3 March 1918. However, by then Kars was under the effective control of Armenian and non-Bolshevik Russian forces. The Ottoman Empire captured Kars on 25 April 1918, but under the Armistice of Mudros (October 1918) was required to withdraw to the pre-war frontier and Kars came under control of the First Republic of Armenia. The Ottomans refused to relinquish Kars; its military governor instead established a government, the Provisional National Government of the Southwestern Caucasus, led by Fahrettin Pirioglu, that claimed Turkish sovereignty over Kars and Turkic-speaking regions as far as Batumi and Alexandropol (Gyumri). Much of the region fell under the administrative control of Armenia in January 1919 but the pro-Turkish government remained in the city until a joint operation launched by British and Armenian troops dissolved it on 19 April 1919, arresting its leaders and sending them to Malta. In May 1919, Kars came under the full administration of the Armenian Republic and became the capital of its Vanand province.

Skirmishes between the Turkish revolutionaries and Armenian border troops in Olti took place during the summer of 1920. In the autumn of that year four Turkish divisions under the command of General Kâzım Karabekir invaded the Armenian Republic, triggering the Turkish-Armenian War. Kars had been fortified to withstand a lengthy siege but, to the astonishment of all, was taken with little resistance by Turkish forces on 30 October 1920, in what some modern scholars have called one of the worst military fiascoes in Armenian history. The terms of the Treaty of Alexandropol, signed by the representatives of Armenia and Turkey on 2 December 1920, forced Armenia to give back all the Ottoman territories granted to it in the Treaty of Sèvres.

After the Bolshevik advance into Armenia, the Treaty of Alexandropol was superseded by the Treaty of Kars (October 23, 1921), signed between Turkey and the Soviet Union. The treaty allowed for Soviet annexation of Adjara in exchange for Turkish control of the regions of Kars, Igdir, and Ardahan. The Treaty of Kars established peaceful relations between the two nations, but as early as 1939, some British diplomats noted indications that the Soviet Union was not satisfied with the established border. The Treaty of Kars, signed in 1921 by the Government of the Grand National Assembly and by the Soviet republics of Armenia, Azerbaijan and Georgia, established the current north-eastern boundaries of Turkey. The treaty included de jure provisions guaranteeing the Armenian residents right to relinquish Turkish nationality, leave the territory freely and take with them either their goods or the proceeds of their sale, but by some accounts formerly Armenian lands had de facto become state property as a consequence of the treaty.

=== After World War II ===
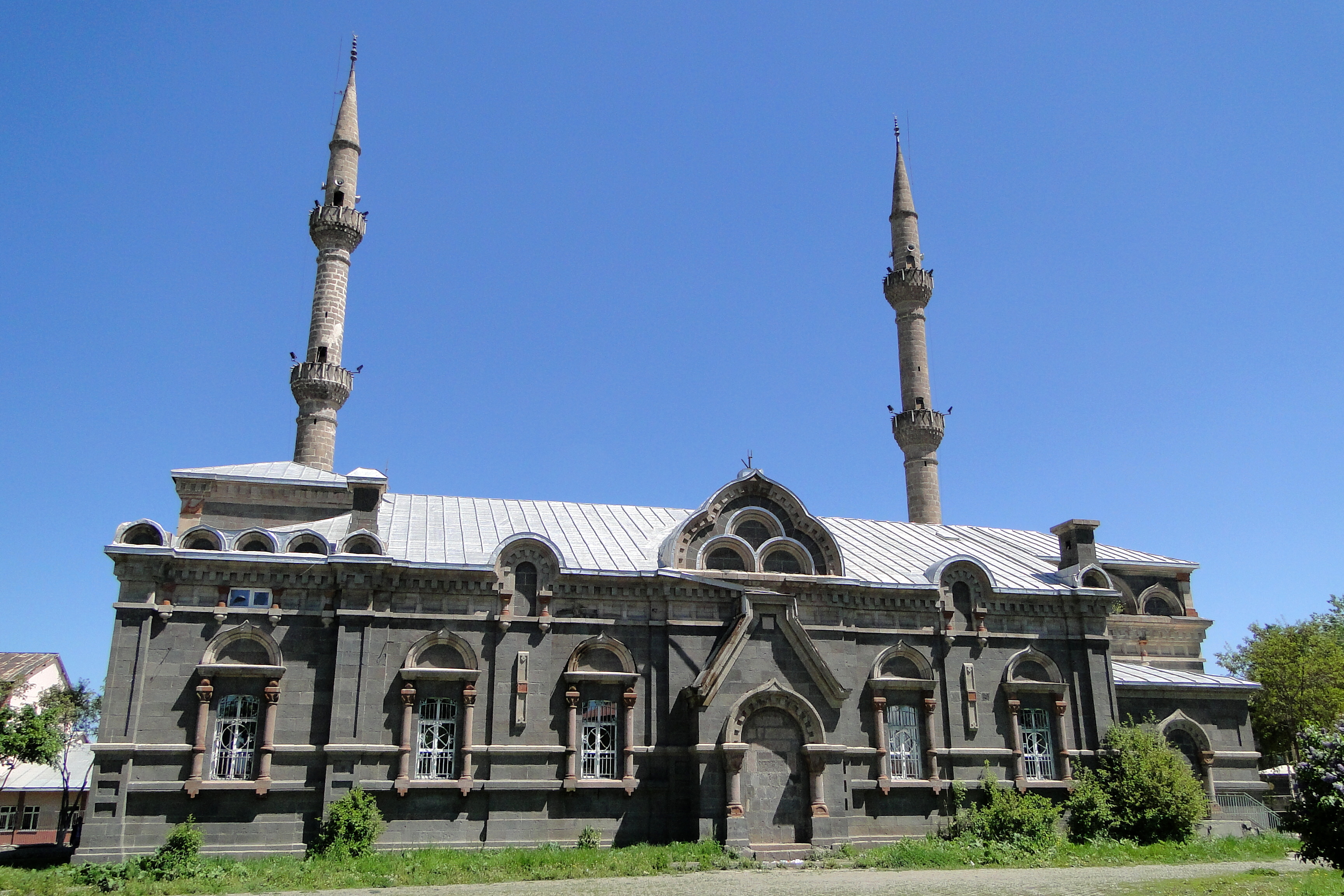
Fethiye Mosque, the former Russian military cathedral built in tribute to Alexander Nevsky

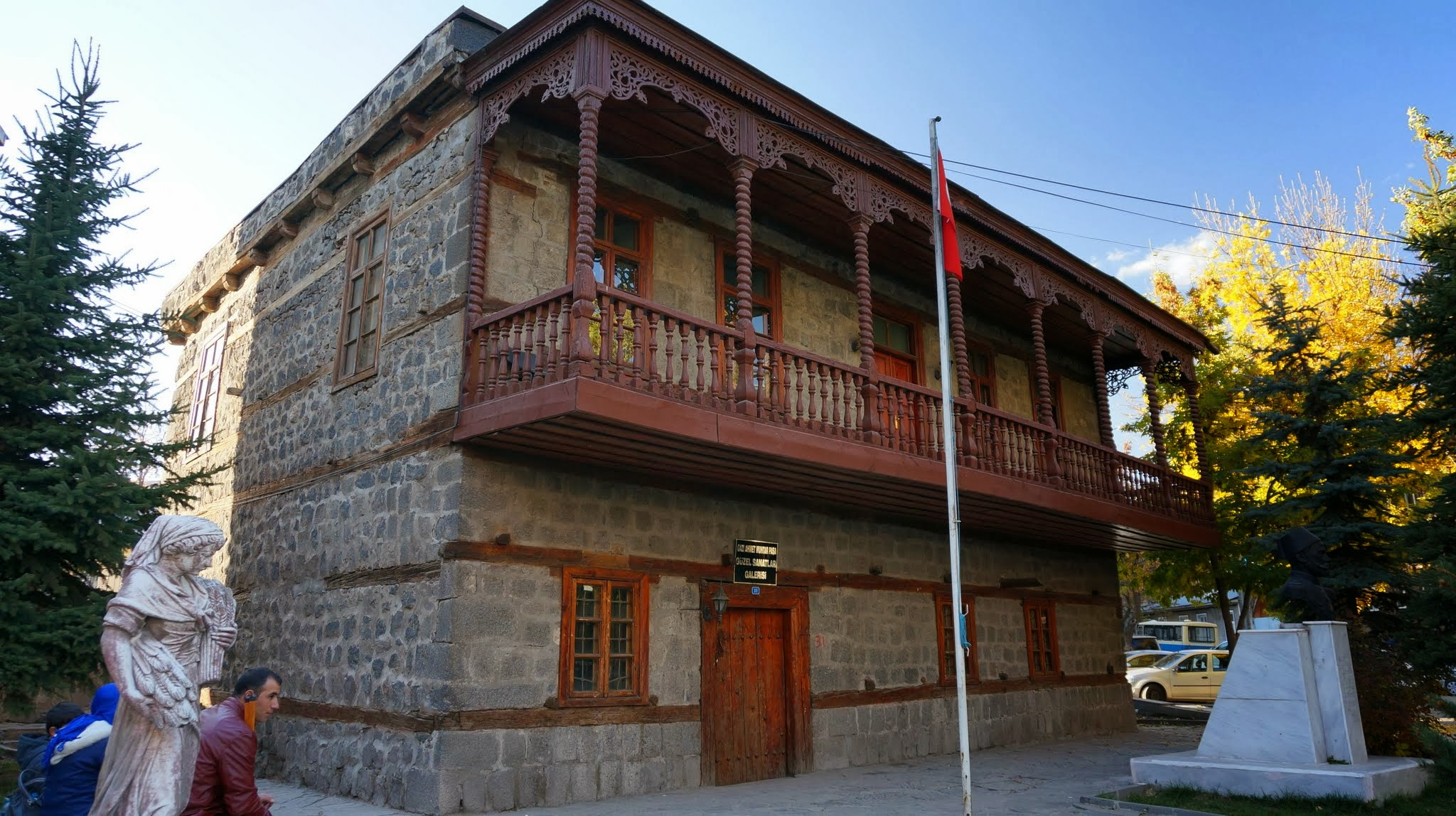
The Gazi Ahmet Paşa Konağı, a traditional house in Kars built during the period the city was part of the Russian Empire

After World War II, the Soviet Union attempted to annul the Kars treaty and regain the Kars region and the adjoining region of Ardahan. On June 7, 1945, Soviet Foreign Minister Vyacheslav Molotov told the Turkish ambassador to Moscow Selim Sarper that the regions should be returned to the Soviet Union, on behalf of the Georgian and Armenian republics. Turkey found itself in a difficult position: it wanted good relations with the Soviet Union, but at the same time they refused to give up the territories. Turkey itself was in no condition to fight a war with the Soviet Union, which had emerged as a superpower after the second world war. By the autumn of 1945, Soviet troops in the Caucasus were ordered to prepare for a possible invasion of Turkey. Prime Minister Winston Churchill objected to these territorial claims, while President Harry Truman initially felt that the matter should not concern other parties. With the onset of the Cold War, however, the United States came to see Turkey as a useful ally against Soviet expansion and began to support it financially and militarily. By 1948 the Soviet Union dropped its claims to Kars and the other regions.

=== Recent history ===
In April 1993, Turkey closed its Kars border crossing with Armenia, in a protest against the capture of the Kelbajar district of Azerbaijan by Armenian forces during the First Nagorno-Karabakh War. Since then the land border between Armenia and Turkey has remained closed. In 2006, former Kars mayor Naif Alibeyoğlu said that opening the border would boost the local economy and reawaken the city. Despite unsuccessful attempts to establish diplomatic relations between the two countries in 2009, there remained opposition and pressure from the local population against the re-opening of the border. Under pressure from Azerbaijan, and the local population, including the 20% ethnic Azerbaijani minority, the Turkish foreign minister Ahmet Davutoğlu reiterated in 2010 and 2011 that opening the border with Armenia was out of the question. As of 2014, the border remains closed.

The last elected mayor of Kars was Ayhan Bilgen of the Peoples' Democratic Party (HDP), who was elected in 2019, and arrested and deposed in 2020. He was replaced by the governor of Kars Province, Eyüp Tepe, as a government-appointed trustee.

== Demographics ==
According to Turkey's 2011 Statistical Yearbook, the area has been depopulating because of migration to bigger cities. In Istanbul alone, there are 269,388 people from Kars, more than three times the city's population.

Today, Kars has a mixed population of Azerbaijanis, Kurds and Turks. Most of the population in Kars is Sunni Muslim, mainly made up by the population of Kurds and Turks, and the minority is Shia Muslim, mainly among the Azerbaijanis. The Shia Azerbaijanis make up 20% of the city's population. The Azerbaijanis are mainly composed of the Terekeme and Qarapapaq sub-ethnic groups.

Year	Total	Turks	Armenians	Others
1878	4,244	2,835 (66.8%)	1,031 (24.4%)	378 Caucasus Greeks (8.9%)
1886	3,939	841 (21.4%)	2,483 (63%)	322 Caucasus Greeks (8.2%), 247 Russians (6.3%)
1897	20,805	786 (3.8%)	10,332 (49.7%)	5,478 Russians (26.3%), 1,084 Poles (5.2%), 733 Caucasus Greeks (3.5%), 486 Tatars (2.3%)
1916	30,514	1,210 (3.9%)	25,665 (84.1%)	1,487 Russians (4.9%), 1,828 other Christians (5.9%), 298 other Muslims, 25 Jews
1970	54,000			
1990	78,455			
2000	78,473			
2013	78,101			

== Government ==
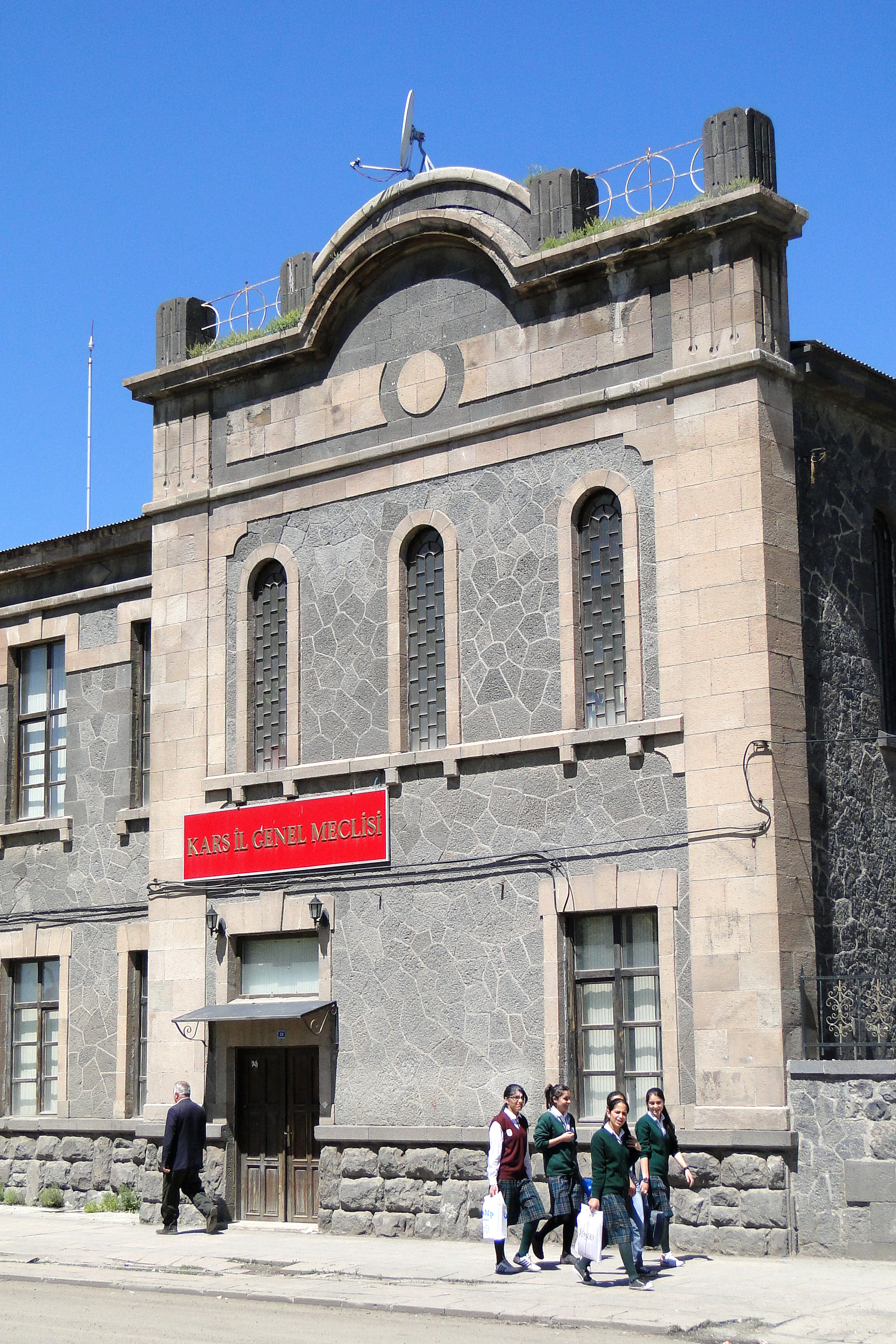
Provincial Special Administration Building in Kars

The present day ethnic make-up of Kars is also reflected in politics, with the Turks and Azerbaijanis often voting for the nationalist MHP and the Kurds often voting for the pro-Kurdish HDP. On 30 March 2014, Murtaza Karaçanta (MHP) was elected mayor. During the June 2015 elections, Kars was won by the pro-Kurdish HDP, becoming the largest political party in both the city and the province of Kars. The last elected mayor was Ayhan Bilgen from the HDP until he was deposed in October 2020.

== Climate ==
Kars has a humid continental climate (Köppen: Dfb, Trewartha: Dcb). It experiences significant seasonal and diurnal temperature variation, due to its location away from large bodies of water, its high elevation and location, where the high plateau of Eastern Anatolia converges with the Lesser Caucasus mountain range.

Summers are generally brief and very warm with cool nights. The average high temperature in August is 27 °C (81 °F).

Winters are freezing to frigid. The average low January temperature is −15 °C (5 °F), and temperatures can plummet to −30 °C (−22 °F) during the winter months. Kars experiences frequent and sometimes heavy snowfall, with four months of snow cover on average.

Highest recorded temperature: 37.1 °C (98.8 °F) on 24 August 2022
Lowestrecorded temperature: −37.0 °C (−34.6 °F) on 4 February 1947

Climate data for Kars (1991–2020 normals, extremes 1931–2023)
Month	Jan	Feb	Mar	Apr	May	Jun	Jul	Aug	Sep	Oct	Nov	Dec	Year
Record high °C (°F)	9.3 (48.7)	12.0 (53.6)	19.1 (66.4)	25.0 (77.0)	28.3 (82.9)	33.9 (93.0)	35.6 (96.1)	37.1 (98.8)	33.0 (91.4)	26.8 (80.2)	21.9 (71.4)	15.9 (60.6)	37.1 (98.8)
Mean daily maximum °C (°F)	−3.2 (26.2)	−1.2 (29.8)	4.9 (40.8)	12.3 (54.1)	17.3 (63.1)	22.2 (72.0)	26.3 (79.3)	27.3 (81.1)	23.0 (73.4)	16.1 (61.0)	7.5 (45.5)	−0.4 (31.3)	12.7 (54.9)
Daily mean °C (°F)	−9.4 (15.1)	−7.7 (18.1)	−1.0 (30.2)	5.7 (42.3)	10.4 (50.7)	14.5 (58.1)	17.9 (64.2)	18.4 (65.1)	14.1 (57.4)	8.2 (46.8)	0.6 (33.1)	−6.2 (20.8)	5.5 (41.9)
Mean daily minimum °C (°F)	−14.8 (5.4)	−13.4 (7.9)	−6.3 (20.7)	−0.2 (31.6)	4.3 (39.7)	7.4 (45.3)	10.5 (50.9)	10.7 (51.3)	6.1 (43.0)	1.5 (34.7)	−4.8 (23.4)	−11.2 (11.8)	−0.8 (30.6)
Record low °C (°F)	−36.7 (−34.1)	−37.0 (−34.6)	−31.5 (−24.7)	−22.6 (−8.7)	−7.0 (19.4)	−4.0 (24.8)	0.1 (32.2)	−1.9 (28.6)	−4.4 (24.1)	−17.5 (0.5)	−30.0 (−22.0)	−35.0 (−31.0)	−37.0 (−34.6)
Average precipitation mm (inches)	23.2 (0.91)	21.4 (0.84)	33.1 (1.30)	57.0 (2.24)	83.6 (3.29)	75.0 (2.95)	65.1 (2.56)	45.1 (1.78)	29.7 (1.17)	44.6 (1.76)	26.6 (1.05)	25.6 (1.01)	530.0 (20.87)
Average precipitation days	9.97	9.6	11.23	13.9	18.93	14.37	11.13	9.67	7.07	10.17	8.43	10.43	134.9
Average relative humidity (%)	78.9	77.6	73.5	67.3	67.3	65.3	64.3	60.1	59.8	67.8	73.1	78.9	69.5
Mean monthly sunshine hours	105.4	132.8	167.4	183.0	226.3	276.0	316.2	310.0	249.0	192.2	147.0	102.3	2,407.6
Mean daily sunshine hours	3.4	4.7	5.4	6.1	7.3	9.2	10.2	10.0	8.3	6.2	4.9	3.3	6.5
Source 1: Turkish State Meteorological Service
Source 2: NOAA (humidity)

== Sports ==
The town has a football club Kars S.K. Bandy, a sport which does not exist in Turkey today, was once played here.

== Education ==
Kars hosts the Kafkas University, which was established in 1992.

== Transport ==
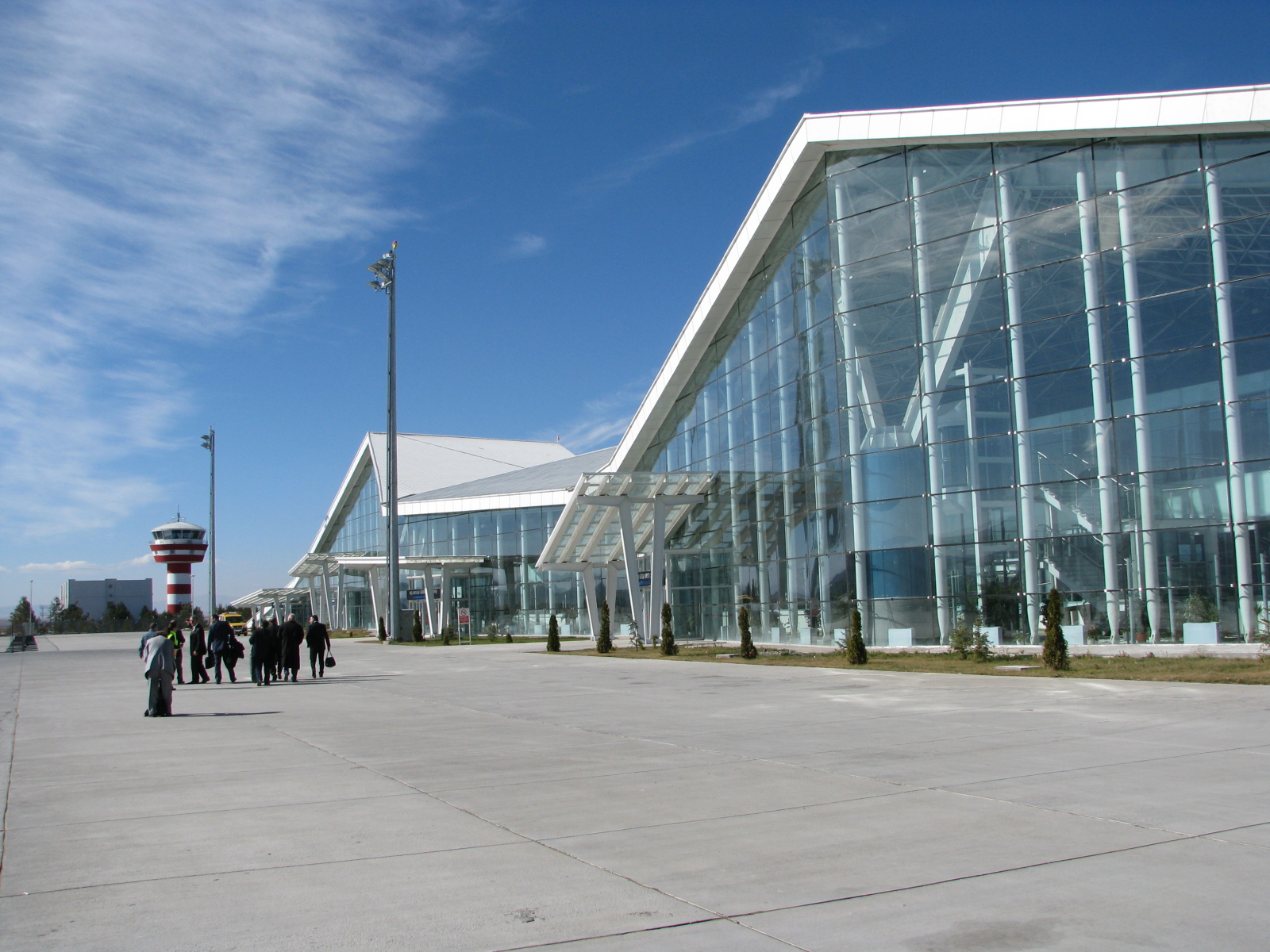
Kars Harakani Airport

Kars is served by a main highway from Erzurum, and lesser roads run north to Ardahan and south to Igdir. The town has an airport (Kars Harakani Airport), with daily direct flights to Ankara and Istanbul. Kars is served by a station on the Turkish Railways (TCDD) that links it to Erzurum. This line was originally laid when Kars was within the Russian Empire and connected the city to nearby Alexandropol and Tiflis, with a wartime, narrow-gauge extension running to Erzurum. Turkey's border crossings with Armenia, including the rail link, the Kars-Gyumri-Tbilisi railway, have regrettably been closed since April 1993. Turkey's border with Armenia was closed down after local Armenian forces occupied the Kalbajar District (adjacent to disputed Nagorno Karabakh) in Azerbaijan. (As of September 2018, Turkey maintains that the border will remain closed until Armenia ends its occupation). Construction on a new line, the Kars–Tbilisi–Baku railway, intended to connect Turkey with Georgia and Azerbaijan, began in 2010. The line became operational on October 30, 2017. The line connects Kars to Akhalkalaki in Georgia, from where trains will continue to Tbilisi, and Baku in Azerbaijan.

== Places of interest ==
=== Kars Citadel ===
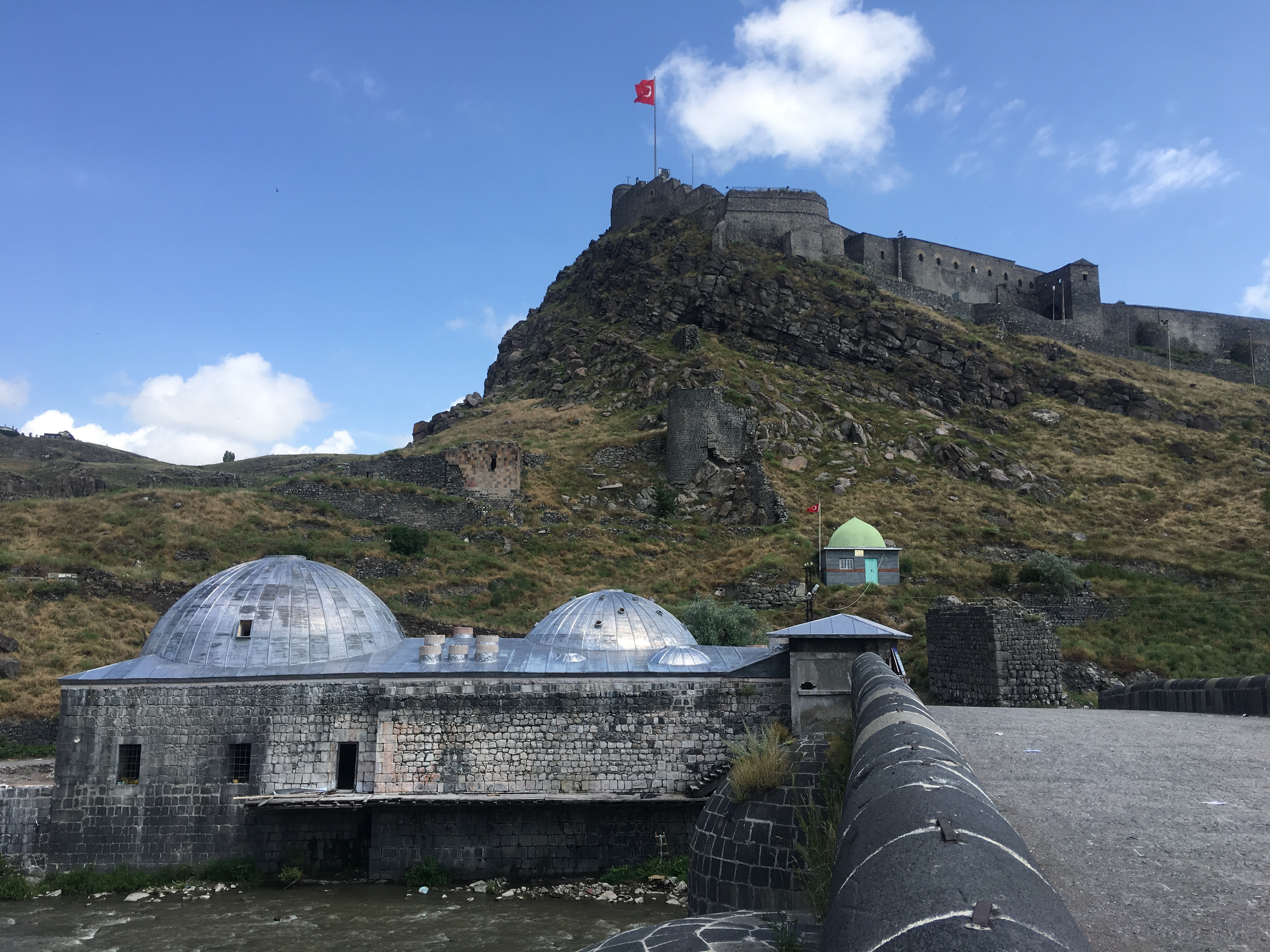
Kars Citadel from the river

The Castle of Kars (Turkish: Kars Kalesi), also known as the Citadel, sits at the top a rocky hill overlooking Kars. Its walls date back to the Bagratuni Armenian period (there is surviving masonry on the north side of the castle) but it probably took on its present form during the thirteenth century when Kars was ruled by the Zak'arid dynasty.

The walls bear crosses in several places, including a Khachkar with a building inscription in Armenian on the easternmost tower, so the much repeated statement that Kars castle was built by Ottoman Sultan Murad III during the war with Safavid Iran, at the close of the sixteenth century, is inaccurate. However, Murad probably ordered the reconstruction of much of the city walls (they are similar to those that the Ottoman army constructed at Ardahan). During the eighteenth century, at the Battle of Kars (1745), a crushing defeat was inflicted upon the Ottoman army by the Persian conqueror, Nader Shah, not far from the city of Kars.

By the nineteenth century the citadel had lost most of its defensive purpose and a series of outer fortresses and defensive works were constructed to encircle Kars – this new defensive system proved particularly notable during the Siege of Kars in 1855.

=== Other historical structures ===
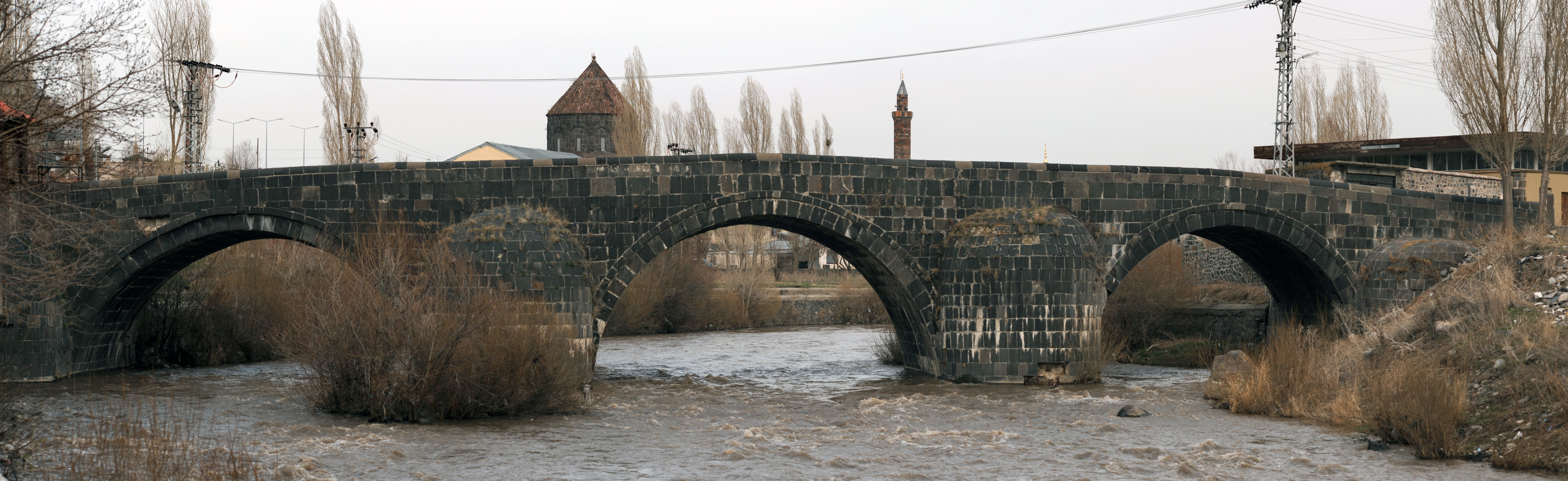
The Taşköprü (Stone Bridge, 1725), built over the Kars River.

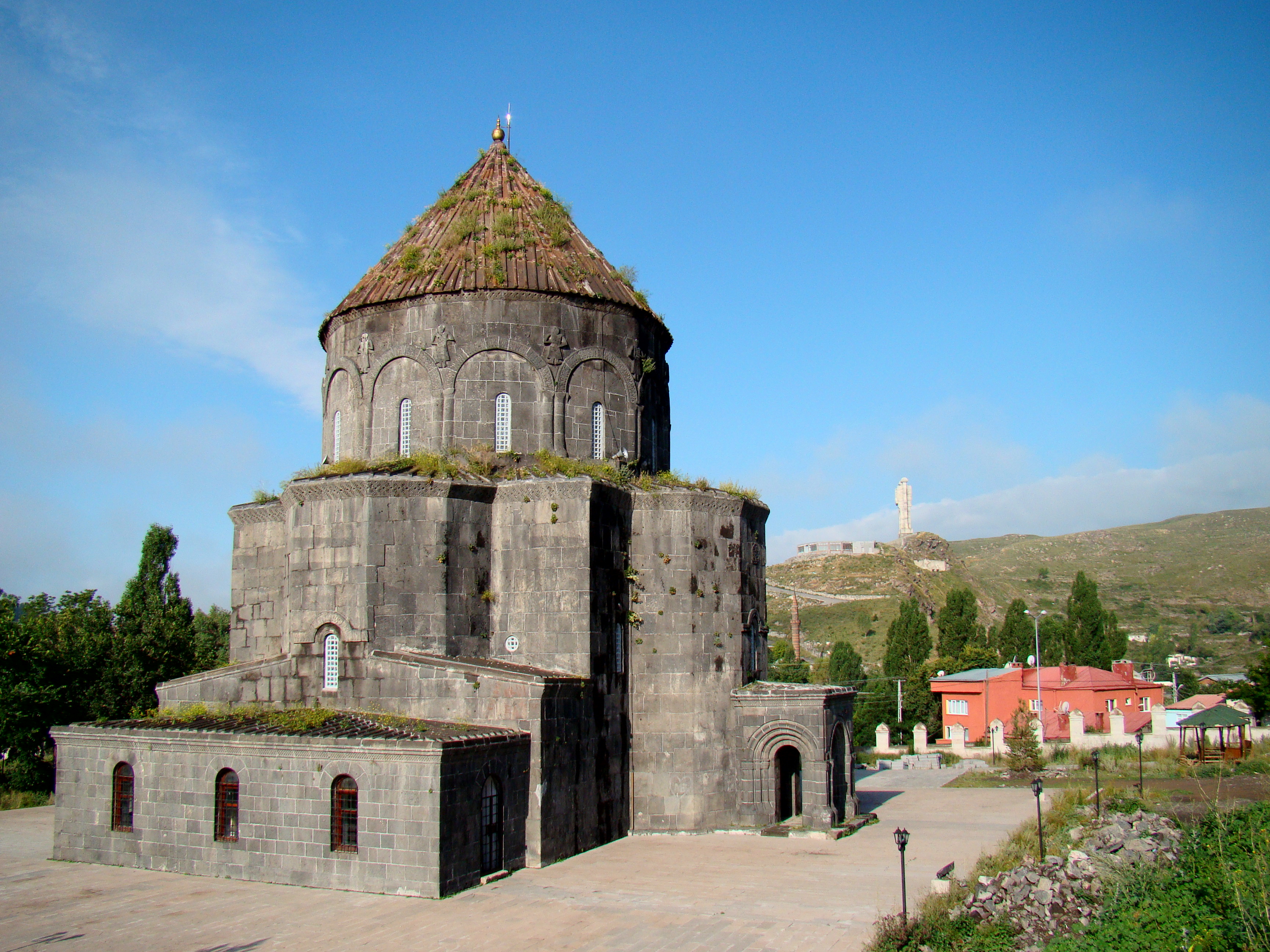
The Armenian Church of the Apostles housed a museum in the 1960s–70s and was converted to a mosque in 1993.

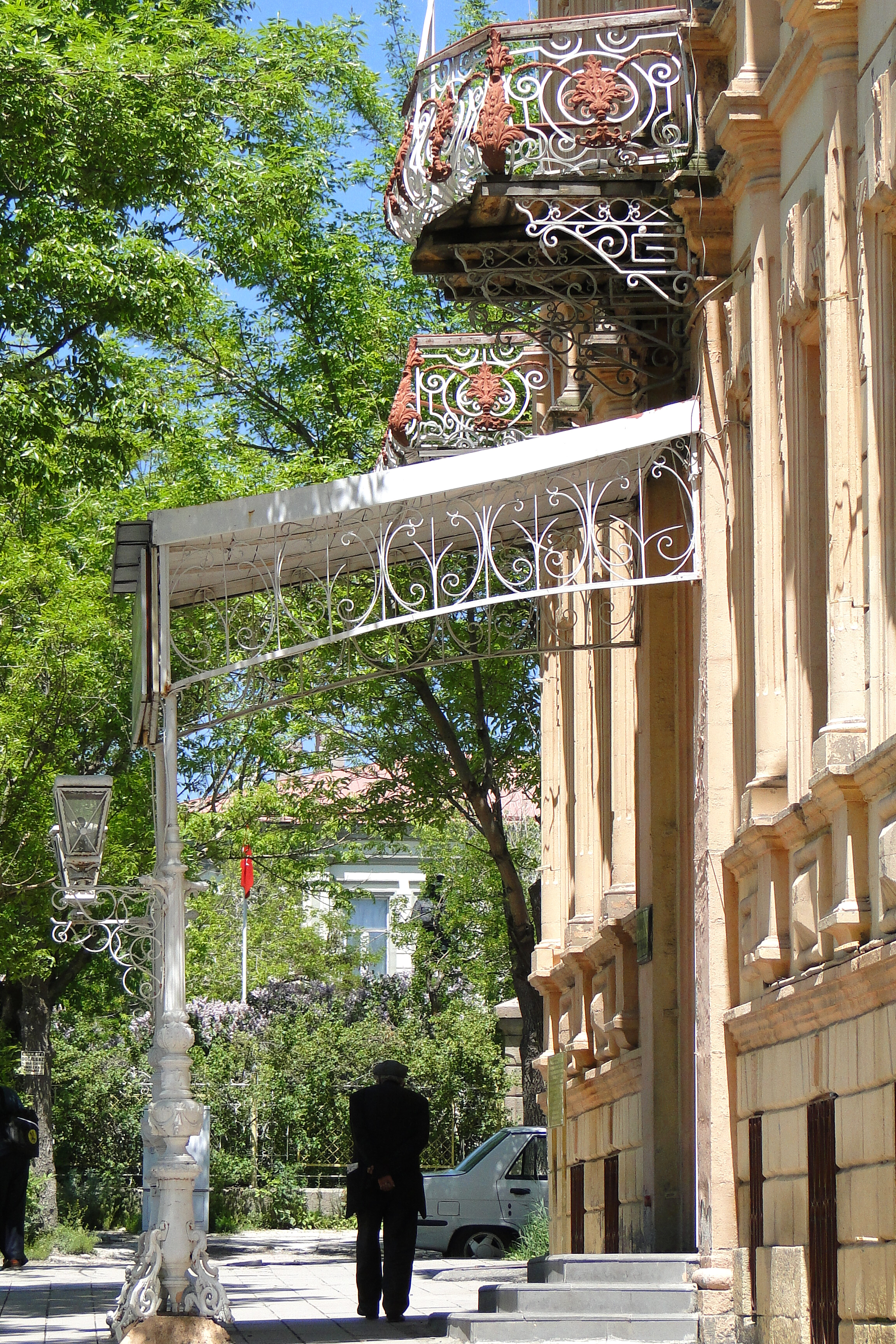
Belle Epoque Russian Architecture

Below the castle is a mosque, formerly the Armenian church known as Surb Arak'elots, the Church of the Holy Apostles. Built in the 1930's, it has a tetraconch plan (a square with four semicircular apses) surmounted by a spherical dome on a cylindrical drum. On the exterior, the drum contains bas-relief depictions of twelve figures, usually interpreted as representing the Twelve Apostles. The dome has a conical roof. The church was converted to a mosque in 1579, and then converted into a Russian Orthodox church in the 1880s. The Russians built porches in front of the church's three entrances, and an elaborate clocktower (now demolished) next to the church. The church was used as a warehouse from the 1930s, and it housed a small museum from 1963 until the late 1970s. Then the building was left to itself for about two decades, until it was converted into a mosque in 1993. In the same district of Kars are two other ruined Armenian churches. A Russian church from the 1900s was converted to a mosque in the 1980s after serving as a school gymnasium.

The Grand Mosque of Kars is the largest historic mosque in the city. Built by the Seljuks, it was restored by the Ottomans in 1579.

The Taşköprü (Stone Bridge) is a bridge over the Kars River, built in 1725. Close to the bridge are three old bathhouses, none of them operating any longer.

As a settlement at the juncture of Turkish, Armenian, Georgian, Kurdish and Russian cultures, the buildings of Kars come in a variety of architectural styles. Most Russian-era buildings in Kars are identical in architectural style to those of Gyumri in Armenia. Orhan Pamuk in the novel Snow, set in Kars, makes repeated references to "the Russian houses", built "in a Baltic style", whose like cannot be seen anywhere else in Turkey, and deplores the deteriorating condition of these houses.

- The Mansion of Ahmet Tevfik Pasha (Ahmet Tevfik Paşa Konağı)
- The Stone Bridge (Taşköprü)
- The Topchuoglu Bath House (Topçuoğlu Hamamı)
- The Ilbeoglu Bath House (İlbeyoğlu Hamamı)
- The Mazlumaga Bath House (Mazlumağa Hamamı)
- The House of Namık Kemal (Namık Kemal Evi)
- Kars Museum (Kars Müzesi)
- The Palace of Beylerbeyi (Beylerbeyi Sarayı)
- The Mansion of Pasha (Paşa Konağı)
- The Cemetery of Arap Baba (Arap Baba Şehitliği)
- The Mosque of Yusuf Pasha (Yusuf Paşa Camii)
- The Mosque of Evliya (Evliya Camii)
- The Tomb of Ebul Hasan-i Harakani (Ebul Hasan-i Harakani Türbesi)
- The Mosque of Fethiye (Fethiye Camii)
- The Mansion of Gazi Ahmet Muhtar Pasha (Gazi Ahmet Paşa Konağı)

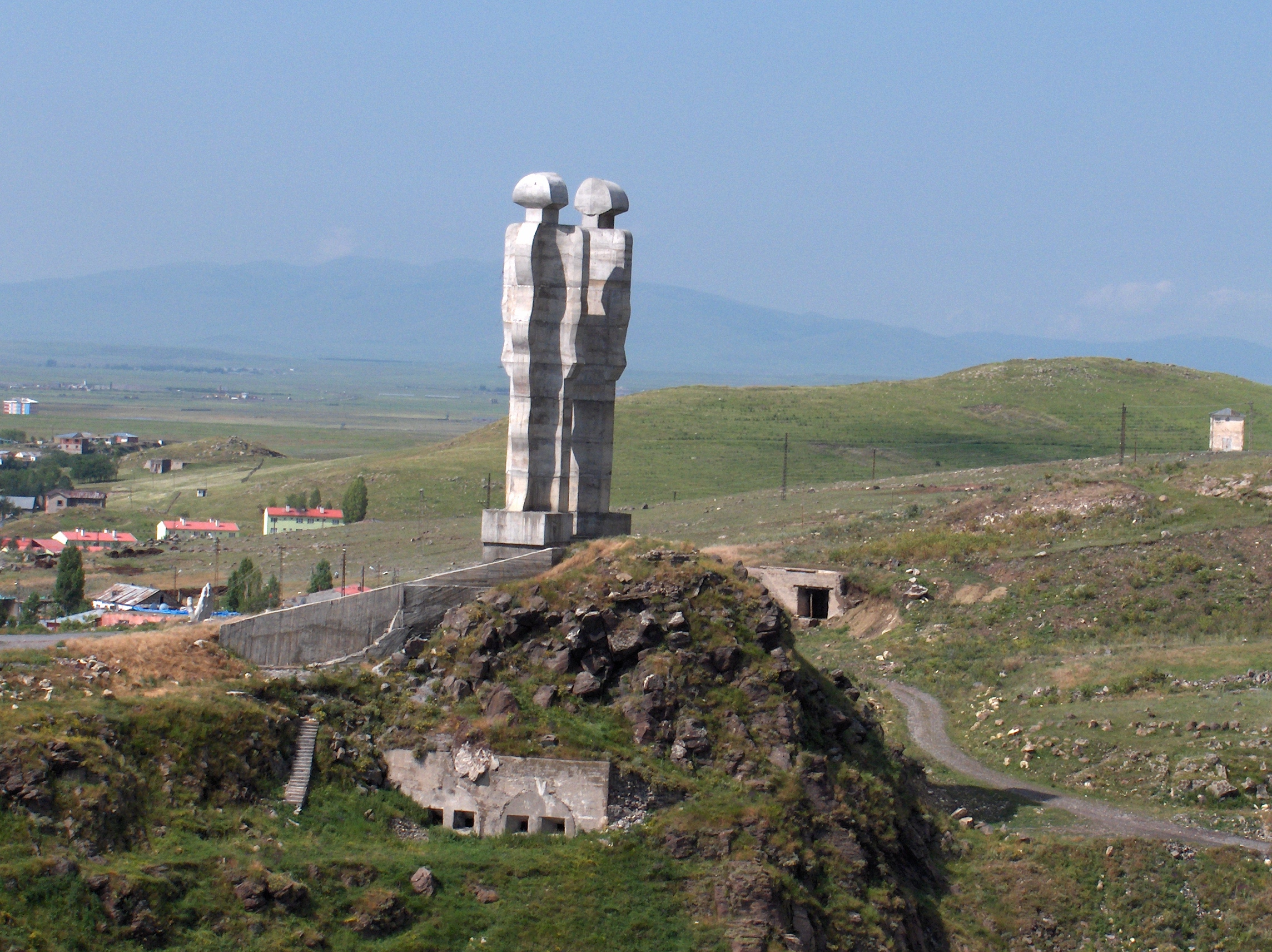
Monument of Humanity in Kars demolished on R. T. Erdogan's directive in 2011.

== International relations ==
=== Twin towns – Sister cities ===
The municipality of Kars has developed sister city relationships with following cities at home and abroad:

Bursa, Turkey; Edirne, Turkey; Ganja, Azerbaijan	(Georgia (country)) Kutaisi, Georgia; Kirkenes, Norway; Wesel, Germany

== In popular culture ==
- Kars is the setting of the 2002 novel Snow (Kar in Turkish) by Orhan Pamuk.
- Yerkir Nairi, a novel by Yeghishe Charents, is dedicated to the public figures and places of Kars, the author's hometown
- Modest Mussorgsky composed the march "The Capture of Kars" to commemorate Russia's victory there in 1855.
- The film Cosmos by Reha Erdem was filmed in and around Kars.
- In 1857 the settlement of Wellington in Ontario, Canada, renamed itself Kars in honor of the Canadian-born General William Fenwick Williams, who organized the defense of Kars during its 1855 siege.

== Sources ==
- Dashdondog, Bayarsaikhan (2011). The Mongols and the Armenians (1220-1335). Brill.
- Barthold, W.; Heywood, C.J. (1997). "Kars". In Van Donzel, E.; Lewis, B.; Pellat, CH. (eds.). The Encyclopaedia of Islam. Brill. pp. 669–671.
- Lordkipanidze, Mariam Davydovna; Hewitt, George B. (1987). Georgia in the XI–XII Centuries. Tbilisi: Ganatleba Publishers.
- Rayfield, Donald (2013). Edge of Empires: A History of Georgia. Reaktion books.
