= Kars River =

Kars river
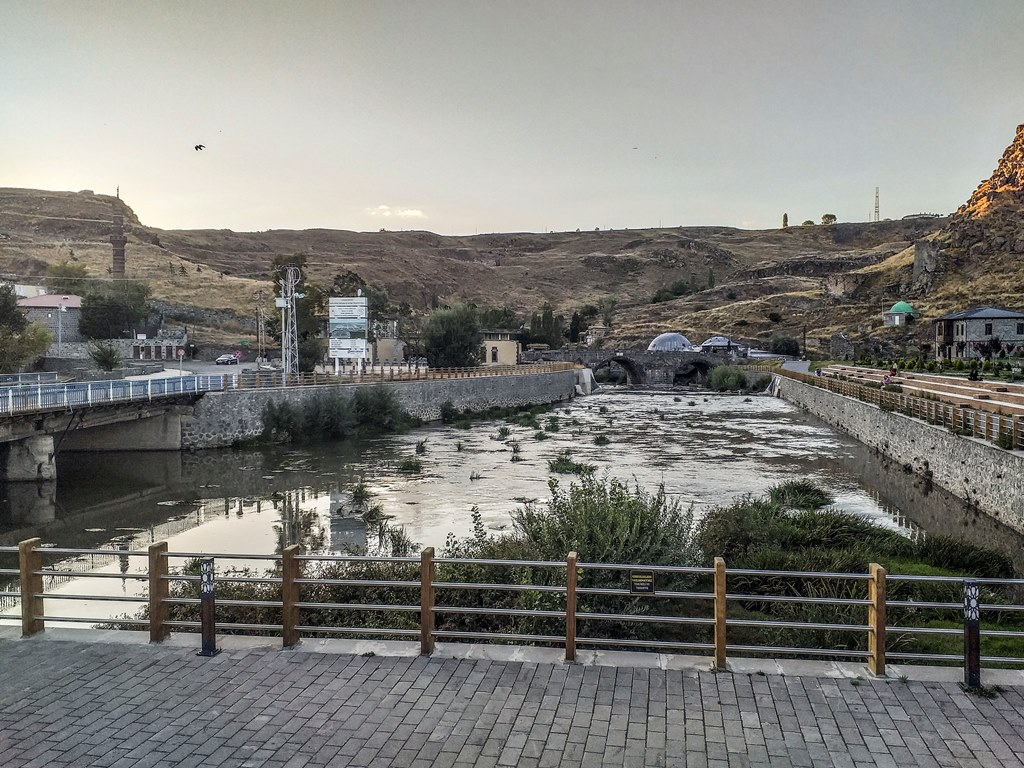
- The Kars river in Kars, Turkey.

- Location within Turkey

Location
- Country: Turkey

Physical characteristics
- Source
  - coordinates: 40.554071°N 42.546953°E
- Mouth: Akhuryan
  - coordinates: 40.616667°N 43.683333°E
- Length: 93 km (58 mi)

The Kars is a river in the Kars Province in northeastern Turkey. This 93 km long river is the largest tributary of the Akhuryan river.

== Geography ==
The Kars river originates in the Allahuekber Mountains in the southwest of the Kars province. Initially, the river flows in a predominantly easterly direction through the Selim District. Then it turns north and flows through Kars. It then flows in a wide arc to the north, later to the east and then to the southeast. Finally, the river feeds into the Akhurian Reservoir on the border with Armenia, through which the Akhuryan River flows.
