= Castle of Kars =

Former fortification in Kars, Turkey

- Kars Kalesi
- Kars, Turkey
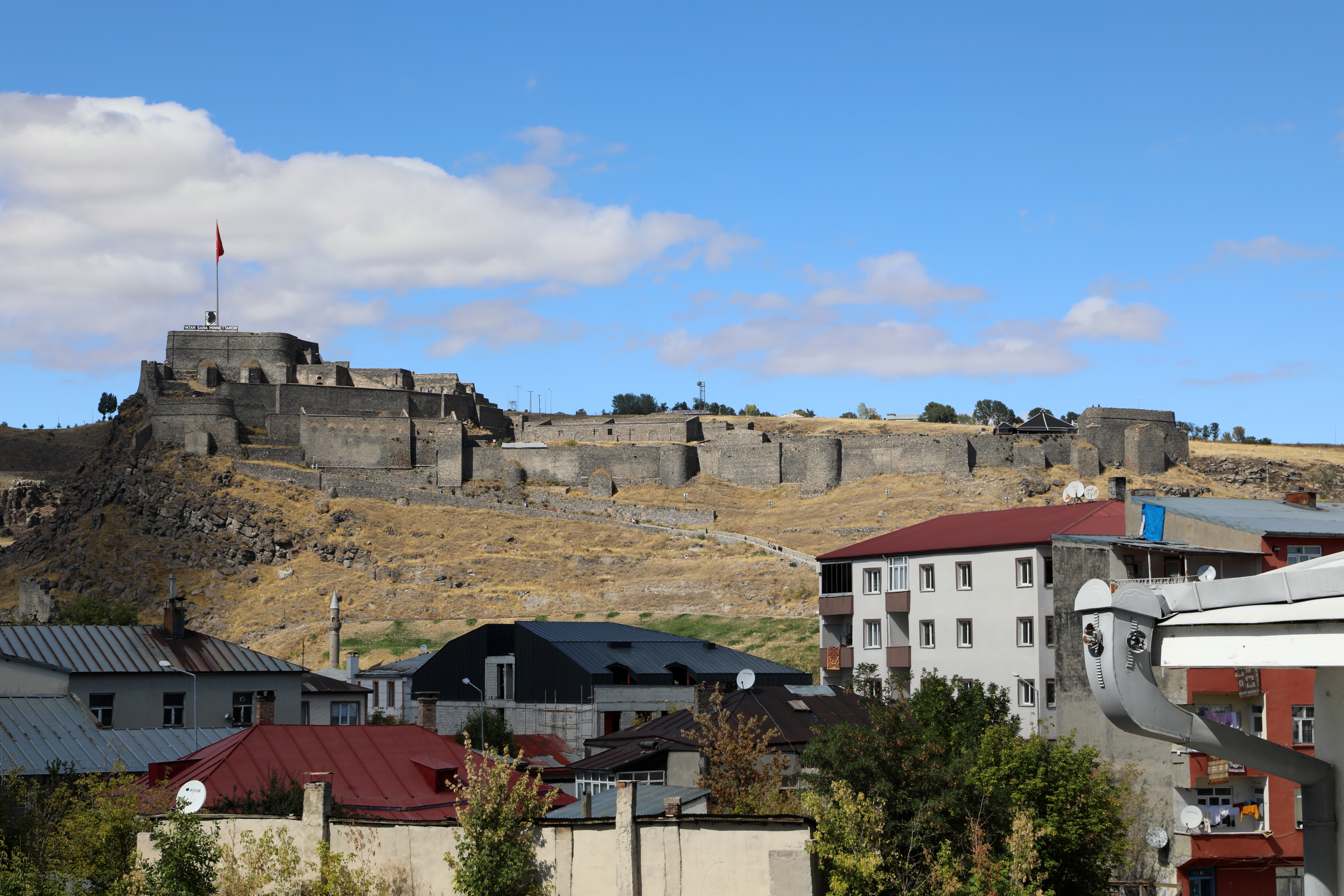
- Castle of Kars

Site information
- Type: Castle
- Controlled by: Ministry of Culture and Tourism
- Open to the public: yes
- Condition: Visitor attraction

Location
- Location of Castle of Kars in Turkey
- Coordinates: 40°36′49″N 43°05′23″E

Site history
- Built: 1153, 1579, 1616, 1636
- Built by: Bagratid dynasty (prior to 1153), Vizier Firuz Akay (1153), Lala Kara Mustafa Pasha (1579)
- Materials: Basalt masonry
- Demolished: 1386, 1606, 1878
- Battles/wars: Battle of Kars at Russo-Turkish War (1877–1878); Caucasus campaign

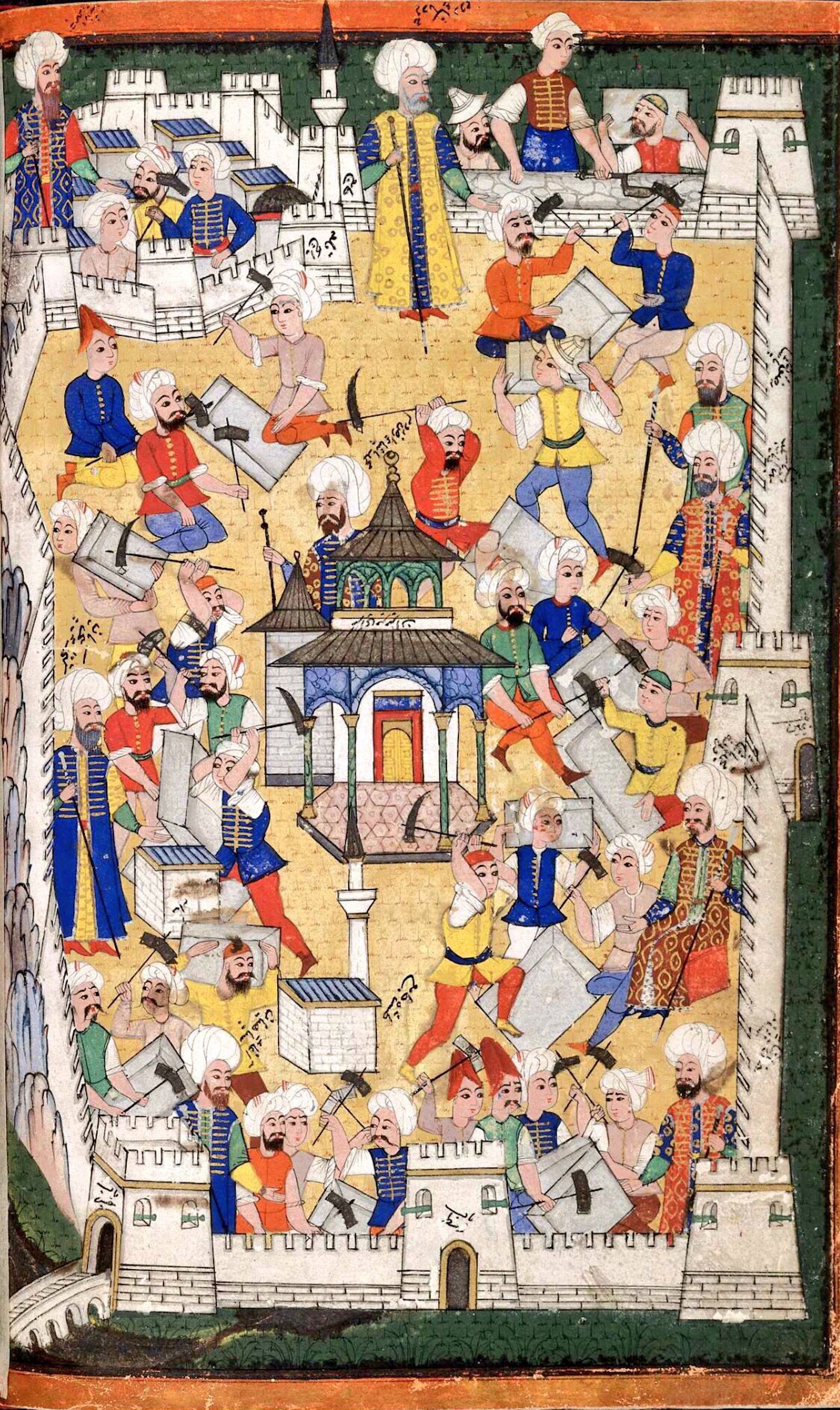
Construction works at the Castle of Kars, Nusretname, (1582)

The Castle of Kars (Turkish: Kars Kalesi, Armenian: Կարսի բերդ) is a former fortification located in Kars, Turkey. It is also known under the name İç Kale ("Central/Inner Castle", "Citadel").

It was first built during the rule of the Armenian Bagratid dynasty and then rebuilt in 1153 by Firuz Akay Commissioned by Sultan Melik Izzeddin Saltuk II. The outer walls surrounding the city were built in the 12th century. The castle, which was destroyed by Timur in 1386, was rebuilt again in 1579 by Lala Mustafa Pasha, who came to Kars ordered by the Ottoman Sultan Murat III.

It is said in the Ottoman sources that the castle was rebuilt with the help of one hundred thousand soldiers and workers. In 1606, the castle was destroyed by the Iranian Shah Abbas I, and in 1616 and in 1636 it was restored twice and new elements were added to it. The castle was badly damaged after the occupation of the Russians after the Ottoman-Russian War of 1877-1878, and partially changed after 40 years of occupation. The walls of the Castle of Kars were made of basalt masonry.

== Layout ==
The castle consisted of two sections, the internal and the external castles. The external walls were made of five layers. In addition, there were deep trenches made in front of it. The main castle looks to the east. The planning of the walls of the external castle is not quite quadrangle. The length of the castle's perimeter makes 3,500 m (11,500 ft), it was supported with 22 watchtowers, of which only seven remained intact until today.

The length of the internal castle makes 250 m (820 ft) in the east-west direction, and about 90 m (300 ft) in the north-south direction. The castle has four gates. The "Su Kapısı" (literally: Water Gate) or "Çeribaşı Kapısı" is situated in the west, "Kagizman Kapısı" orta "Orta Kapı" in the south and "Behram Kapı" in the east. The main gate located in the north opens up to a chasm in front of the castle.

The castle's watchtower can be accessed by climbing the stairs or along the stone paved road.

Just inside the main entrance is a shrine containing the tomb of Jelal Baba who died during the Mongolian invasion in 1239. Within the castle are military lodgings, an ammunition depot, and a small mosque that was rebuilt in the 1990s.

Today, the castle is administered by the Ministry of Culture and Tourism.

== Cultural events ==
In 2005, the castle hosted a music concert by Turkish pop singer Sezen Aksu attended by around 25,000 people.

During the Islamic fasting month of Ramadan in 2011, a Mevlevi Sama ceremony was held for the first time at the castle.
