= List of populated places in Kars Province =

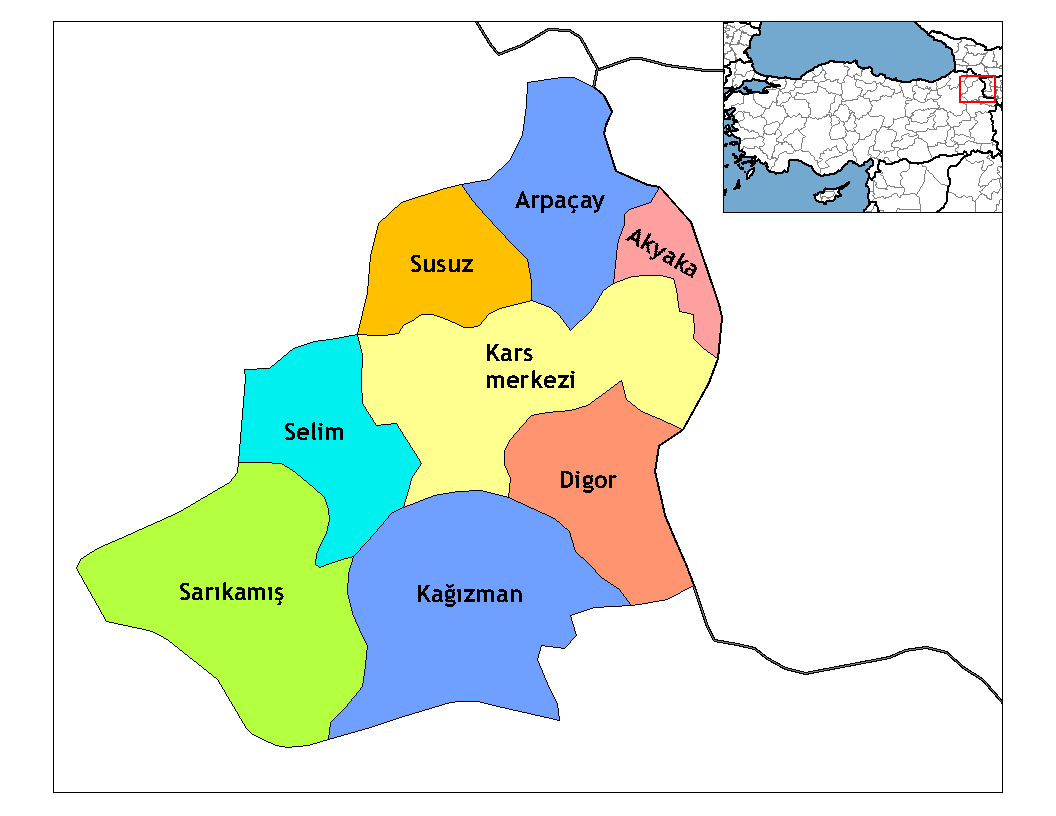
Kars Province

Below is the list of populated places in Kars Province, Turkey, by districts. First place in each list is the administrative center of the district.

== Kars ==
- Kars
- Ağadeve, Kars
- Akbaba, Kars
- Akdere, Kars
- Alaca, Kars
- Alçılı, Kars
- Arazoğlu, Kars
- Arslanizi, Kars
- Ataköy, Kars
- Atayurt, Kars
- Ayakgedikler, Kars
- Aydınalan, Kars
- Azat, Kars
- Başgedikler, Kars
- Başkaya, Kars
- Bayraktar, Kars
- Bekler, Kars
- Boğatepe, Kars
- Boğaz, Kars
- Borluk, Kars
- Bozkale, Kars
- Bulanık, Kars
- Büyükaküzüm, Kars
- Çağlayan, Kars
- Çakmak, Kars
- Çamurlu, Kars
- Çerme, Kars
- Çığırgan, Kars
- Çorak, Kars
- Davul, Kars
- Derecik, Kars
- Dikme, Kars
- Esenkent, Kars
- Esenyazı, Kars
- Eşmeyazı, Kars
- Gelirli, Kars
- Güdeli, Kars
- Hacıhalil, Kars
- Hacıveli, Kars
- Halefoğlu, Kars
- Hamzagerek, Kars
- Hapanlı, Kars
- Hasçiftlik, Kars
- Karacaören, Kars
- Karaçoban, Kars
- Karakale, Kars
- Karakaş, Kars
- Kocabahçe, Kars
- Kozluca, Kars
- Küçükboğatepe, Kars
- Küçükpirveli, Kars
- Küçükyusuf, Kars
- Külveren, Kars
- Kümbetli, Kars
- Maksutçuk, Kars
- Mezraa, Kars
- Ocaklı, Kars
- Oğuzlu, Kars
- Ortagedikler, Kars
- Ölçülü, Kars
- Soylu, Kars
- Söğütlü, Kars
- Subatan, Kars
- Tazekent, Kars
- Tekneli, Kars
- Üçbölük, Kars
- Verimli, Kars
- Yağıkesen, Kars
- Yalçınlar, Kars
- Yalınkaya, Kars
- Yılanlı, Kars
- Yolaçan, Kars
- Yücelen, Kars

== Akyaka ==
- Akyaka
- Akbulak, Akyaka
- Aslahane, Akyaka
- Boyuntaş, Akyaka
- Büyükdurduran, Akyaka
- Büyükpirveli, Akyaka
- Cebeci, Akyaka
- Camuşlu, Akyaka
- Çetindurak, Akyaka
- Demirkent, Akyaka
- Duraklı, Akyaka
- Esenyayla, Akyaka
- Geçitköy, Akyaka
- Hacıpiri, Akyaka
- İbişköy, Akyaka
- İncedere, Akyaka
- Kalkankale, Akyaka
- Kayadöven, Akyaka
- Karahan, Akyaka
- Kayaköprü, Akyaka
- Küçükaküzüm, Akyaka
- Küçükdurduran, Akyaka
- Kürekdere, Akyaka
- Sulakbahçe, Akyaka
- Süngüderesi, Akyaka
- Şahnalar, Akyaka
- Üçpınar, Akyaka

== Arpaçay ==
- Arpaçay
- Akçakale, Arpaçay
- Akçalar, Arpaçay
- Akmazdam, Arpaçay
- Arslanoğlu, Arpaçay
- Atcılar, Arpaçay
- Aydıngün, Arpaçay
- Bacıoğlu, Arpaçay
- Bardaklı, Arpaçay
- Bozyiğit, Arpaçay
- Burcalı, Arpaçay
- Büyükçatma, Arpaçay
- Carcı, Arpaçay
- Carcıoğlu, Arpaçay
- Çanaksu, Arpaçay
- Dağköyü, Arpaçay
- Değirmenköprü, Arpaçay
- Doğruyol, Arpaçay
- Gediksatılmış, Arpaçay
- Göldalı, Arpaçay
- Gönülalan, Arpaçay
- Gülyüzü, Arpaçay
- Güvercin, Arpaçay
- Hasançavuş, Arpaçay
- Kakaç, Arpaçay
- Karakale, Arpaçay
- Karaurgan, Arpaçay
- Kardeştepe, Arpaçay
- Kıraç, Arpaçay
- Koçköyü, Arpaçay
- Kuyucuk, Arpaçay
- Kuzgunlu, Arpaçay
- Küçükboğaz, Arpaçay
- Küçükçatma, Arpaçay
- Kümbet, Arpaçay
- Melikköyü, Arpaçay
- Mescitli, Arpaçay
- Meydancık, Arpaçay
- Okçuoğlu, Arpaçay
- Polatköyü, Arpaçay
- Söğütlü, Arpaçay
- Taşbaşı, Arpaçay
- Taşdere, Arpaçay
- Taşköprü, Arpaçay
- Taşlıağıl, Arpaçay
- Telek, Arpaçay
- Tepecik, Arpaçay
- Tepeköy, Arpaçay
- Tomarlı, Arpaçay

== Digor ==
- Digor
- Alem, Digor
- Arpalı, Digor
- Aşağıbaşköy, Digor
- Bacalı, Digor
- Başköy, Digor
- Bayırbağı, Digor
- Bostankale, Digor
- Celalköy, Digor
- Çatak, Digor
- Dağpınar, Digor
- Derinöz, Digor
- Dolaylı, Digor
- Düzgeçit, Digor
- Eren, Digor
- Gülhayran, Digor
- Halıkışlak, Digor
- Hasancan, Digor
- Hisarönü, Digor
- Karabağ, Digor
- Karakale, Digor
- Kilittaşı, Digor
- Kocaköy, Digor
- Köseler, Digor
- Mahirbey, Digor
- Oyuklu, Digor
- Saklıca, Digor
- Sorguçkavak, Digor
- Sorkunlu, Digor
- Şatıroğlu, Digor
- Şenol, Digor
- Şirinköy, Digor
- Türkmeşen, Digor
- Uzunkaya, Digor
- Varlı, Digor
- Yağlıca, Digor
- Yaylacık, Digor
- Yemençayır, Digor
- Yeniköy, Digor

== Kağızman ==
- Kağızman
- Ağdam, Kağızman
- Akçakale, Kağızman
- Akçay, Kağızman
- Akören, Kağızman
- Akyayla, Kağızman
- Altungedik, Kağızman
- Aşağıkaragüney, Kağızman
- Aşağıtut, Kağızman
- Aydınkavak, Kağızman
- Bulanık, Kağızman
- Bücüklü, Kağızman
- Camuşlu, Kağızman
- Çallı, Kağızman
- Çayarası, Kağızman
- Çaybük, Kağızman
- Çengilli, Kağızman
- Çeperli, Kağızman
- Çiçekli, Kağızman
- Çilehane, Kağızman
- Çukurayva, Kağızman
- Değirmendere, Kağızman
- Denizgölü, Kağızman
- Devebük, Kağızman
- Dibekkaya, Kağızman
- Donandı, Kağızman
- Duranlar, Kağızman
- Esenkır, Kağızman
- Evyapan, Kağızman
- Görecek, Kağızman
- Gümüştepe, Kağızman
- Günindi, Kağızman
- Günindiyaylası, Kağızman
- Güvendik, Kağızman
- Karabağ, Kağızman
- Karaboncuk, Kağızman
- Karacaören, Kağızman
- Karakale, Kağızman
- Karakuş, Kağızman
- Keşişkıran, Kağızman
- Kozlu, Kağızman
- Kökpınar, Kağızman
- Kömürlü, Kağızman
- Kötek, Kağızman
- Kuloğlu, Kağızman
- Kuruyayla, Kağızman
- Ortaköy, Kağızman
- Paslı, Kağızman
- Sağbaş, Kağızman
- Şaban, Kağızman
- Taşbilek, Kağızman
- Taşburun, Kağızman
- Tomruktaş, Kağızman
- Tunçkaya, Kağızman
- Ürker, Kağızman
- Yağlıca, Kağızman
- Yalnızağaç, Kağızman
- Yankıpınar, Kağızman
- Yellikıran, Kağızman
- Yenice, Kağızman
- Yolkorur, Kağızman
- Yukarıkaragüney, Kağızman

== Sarıkamış ==
- Sarıkamış
- Akkoz, Sarıkamış
- Akören, Sarıkamış
- Alisofu, Sarıkamış
- Altınbulak, Sarıkamış
- Armutlu, Sarıkamış
- Asbuğa, Sarıkamış
- Aşağısallıpınar, Sarıkamış
- Balabantaş, Sarıkamış
- Balıklı, Sarıkamış
- Başköy, Sarıkamış
- Belencik, Sarıkamış
- Beşyol, Sarıkamış
- Boyalı, Sarıkamış
- Bozat, Sarıkamış
- Çamyazı, Sarıkamış
- Çardakçatı, Sarıkamış
- Çatak, Sarıkamış
- Çolaklı, Sarıkamış
- Eşmeçayır, Sarıkamış
- Gecikmez, Sarıkamış
- Güllüce, Sarıkamış
- Hamamlı, Sarıkamış
- Handere, Sarıkamış
- İnkaya, Sarıkamış
- İsisu, Sarıkamış
- Kalebaşı, Sarıkamış
- Karaköse, Sarıkamış
- Karakurt, Sarıkamış
- Karapınar, Sarıkamış
- Karaurgan, Sarıkamış
- Kayalıboğaz, Sarıkamış
- Kazantaş, Sarıkamış
- Kazıkkaya, Sarıkamış
- Koçoğlu, Sarıkamış
- Kozan, Sarıkamış
- Köroğlu, Sarıkamış
- Kurbançayır, Sarıkamış
- Mescitli, Sarıkamış
- Odalar, Sarıkamış
- Ortakale, Sarıkamış
- Parmakdere, Sarıkamış
- Sırataşlar, Sarıkamış
- Sırbasan, Sarıkamış
- Süngütaşı, Sarıkamış
- Şehitemin, Sarıkamış
- Şehithalit, Sarıkamış
- Taşlıgüney, Sarıkamış
- Topkaya, Sarıkamış
- Uzungazi, Sarıkamış
- Yağbasan, Sarıkamış
- Yarkaya, Sarıkamış
- Yayıklı, Sarıkamış
- Yenigazi, Sarıkamış
- Yeniköy, Sarıkamış
- Yukarısallıpınar, Sarıkamış

== Selim ==
- Selim
- Aşağıdamlapınar, Selim
- Akçakale, Selim
- Akpınar, Selim
- Akyar, Selim
- Alisofu, Selim
- Aşağıkotanlı, Selim
- Başköy, Selim
- Bayburt, Selim
- Baykara, Selim
- Benliahmet, Selim
- Beyköy, Selim
- Bozkuş, Selim
- Bölükbaş, Selim
- Büyükdere, Selim
- Büyük Oluklu, Selim
- Çaybaşı, Selim
- Çıplaklı, Selim
- Darboğaz, Selim
- Dölbentli, Selim
- Eskigazi, Selim
- Eskigeçit, Selim
- Gelinalan, Selim
- Gürbüzler, Selim
- Hasbey, Selim
- İğdir, Selim
- Kamışlı, Selim
- Karaçayır, Selim
- Karahamza, Selim
- Karakale, Selim
- Katranlı, Selim
- Kekeç, Selim
- Kırkpınar, Selim
- Koşapınar, Selim
- Koyunyurdu, Selim
- Laloğlu, Selim
- Mollamustafa, Selim
- Oluklu, Selim
- Ortakale, Selim
- Sarıgün, Selim
- Söğütlü, Selim
- Tozluca, Selim
- Tuygun, Selim
- Yamaçlı, Selim
- Yalnızçam, Selim
- Yassıca, Selim
- Yaylacık, Selim
- Yenice, Selim
- Yeşiltepe, Selim
- Yolgeçmez, Selim
- Yukarıdamlapınar, Selim
- Yukarıkotanlı, Selim

== Susuz ==
- Susuz
- Aksu, Susuz
- Aynalı, Susuz
- Büyükçatak, Susuz
- Çamçavuş, Susuz
- Çığrıklı, Susuz
- Doyumlu, Susuz
- Erdağı, Susuz
- Ermişler, Susuz
- Gölbaşı, Susuz
- Harmanlı, Susuz
- İncesu, Susuz
- İncilipınar, Susuz
- Kalecik, Susuz
- Karapınar, Susuz
- Kayadibi, Susuz
- Kayalık, Susuz
- Keçili, Susuz
- Kırçiçeği, Susuz
- Kırkpınar, Susuz
- Kiziroğlu, Susuz
- Kurugöl, Susuz
- Küçükçatak, Susuz
- Ortalar, Susuz
- Porsuklu, Susuz
- Taşlıca, Susuz
- Yaylacık, Susuz
- Yolboyu, Susuz
