= Alvana =

Alvana (Georgian: ალვანა) is a vanished village in the historical Palakatsio region. The settlement is located within the boundaries of the village of Gülyüzü (formerly Pekrasheni), currently in the Arpaçay District of Kars Province in Turkey.

== History ==
The Georgian toponym Alvana (ალვანა) derives from the poplar tree "alva" (ალვა; Populus pyramidalis), meaning "poplar grove." This toponym is recorded as Alvana (الوانە) in the Ottoman land-survey register (mufassal defter) of 1595 and in the cebe defter of Çıldır Province (Çıldır Eyaleti).

The historical Palakatsio region, where the village of Alvana is located, was within the borders of Georgia in the Middle Ages. Indeed, the Ottomans captured this region and village from the Georgians in 1578.

The village of Alvana was recorded as "Alvana" (الوانە) in the Ottoman land-survey register (mufassal defter) of 1595. At that time, the village was within the Janbaz district (nahiye) of Çıldır province (liva), within the Gürcistan Vilayeti ("Province of Georgia"). Alvana, which was listed in the register as being next to the village of Pekrasheni (ფექრაშენი), was vacated by this time.

The name Alvana was also recorded as "Alvana" (الوانە) in the Ottoman cebe defter of Çıldır province (Çıldır Eyaleti) covering the period 1694-1732. In 1132 AH (1719/1720), the village, which held the same administrative position, had a revenue of 3,000 akçe, and the area was allocated to a person named Ali.

Georgian Turkologist Sergi Jikia stated that the name of this settlement was mentioned as Alvana (Алвана) in Russian archive documents, but the village was deserted. In fact, the village of Alvana was not included in the Russian census of 1886.
