= Azer Bülbül =

Turkish musical artist (1967–2012

- Born: Subutay Kesgin; 1 February 1967; Akyaka, Kars, Turkey
- Died: 6 January 2012 (aged 44) Antalya, Turkey
- Genres: Turkish folk music; arabesque
- Occupations: Singer; actor
- Instrument: Vocals
- Years active: 1984–2012
- Formerly of: Seyfi Doğanay; Müslüm Gürses

Subutay Kesgin (February 1, 1967 – January 6, 2012), better known by his stage name Azer Bülbül, was a Turkish folk singer and actor of Azerbaijani descent.

== Biography ==
Azer Bülbül was born Subutay Kesgin in Arpaçay, Kars in Azerbaijani Terekeme family. After moving to Germany with his family, Bülbül started his music career, releasing his debut album Garip Yolcu in 1984. After releasing a string of folk music albums, he achieved commercial success with his 1994 album, Ben Babayım. On 15 February 2001, he was convicted for drug-related charges and released on bail. In 2011, he stated that he was rehabilitated and had been clean for 18 months.

Bülbül died of a heart attack on 6 January 2012 in Antalya. He was found dead in his hotel room and was buried in Esenyurt Cemetery in Istanbul.

== Personal life ==
Azer Bülbül was married once and later divorced. He did not have any children. Bülbül also proposed to Yıldız Tilbe but she refused his marriage offer.

== Discography ==
- 1984: Garip Yolcu
- 1986: Esmerin Adı Oya
- 1987: Yalan Olur
- 1987: Yoruldum
- 1988: Güzel Kız
- 1989: Fırat
- 1989: Yürüyorum
- 1990: Ben Sana Vurgunum
- 1992: Bir Yudum Su
- 1993: Dağlara Yolculuk
- 1994 Ben Babayım & Yaralandın mı Ey Can
- 1995: Ağıt
- 1996: Doğudan Esintiler (Ft.). Seyfi Doğanay
- 1996: Eline Düştüm (Ft.). Müslüm Gürses
- 1996: Yine Düştün Aklıma (Ft.) Müslüm Gürses & Mustafa Keser
- 1997: Hayatımın Şarkıları
- 1998: Zordayım & Canım Yanıyor
- 1999: Kör Kurşun & Sana Yalan Gelebilir
- 2000: Dünden Bugüne
- 2001: Bana Düştü & Neden Dedo
- 2001: Yalan Sevgiler
- 2002: Başımda Bela Var
- 2004: Ateş Düştüğü Yeri Yakar
- 2005: Seçmeler
- 2006: Üzülmedim ki
- 2007: Kalemin Kırıldı
- 2011: Duygularım

== Filmography ==
- 2012: Seninki Kaç Para
- 2008: Vefa Borcu
- 2008: Arkadaş
- 2002: Rus Gelin
- 1998: Bedel
- 1985: Mavi Mavi Masmavi
