= Kars gravyer cheese =

Turkish cheese

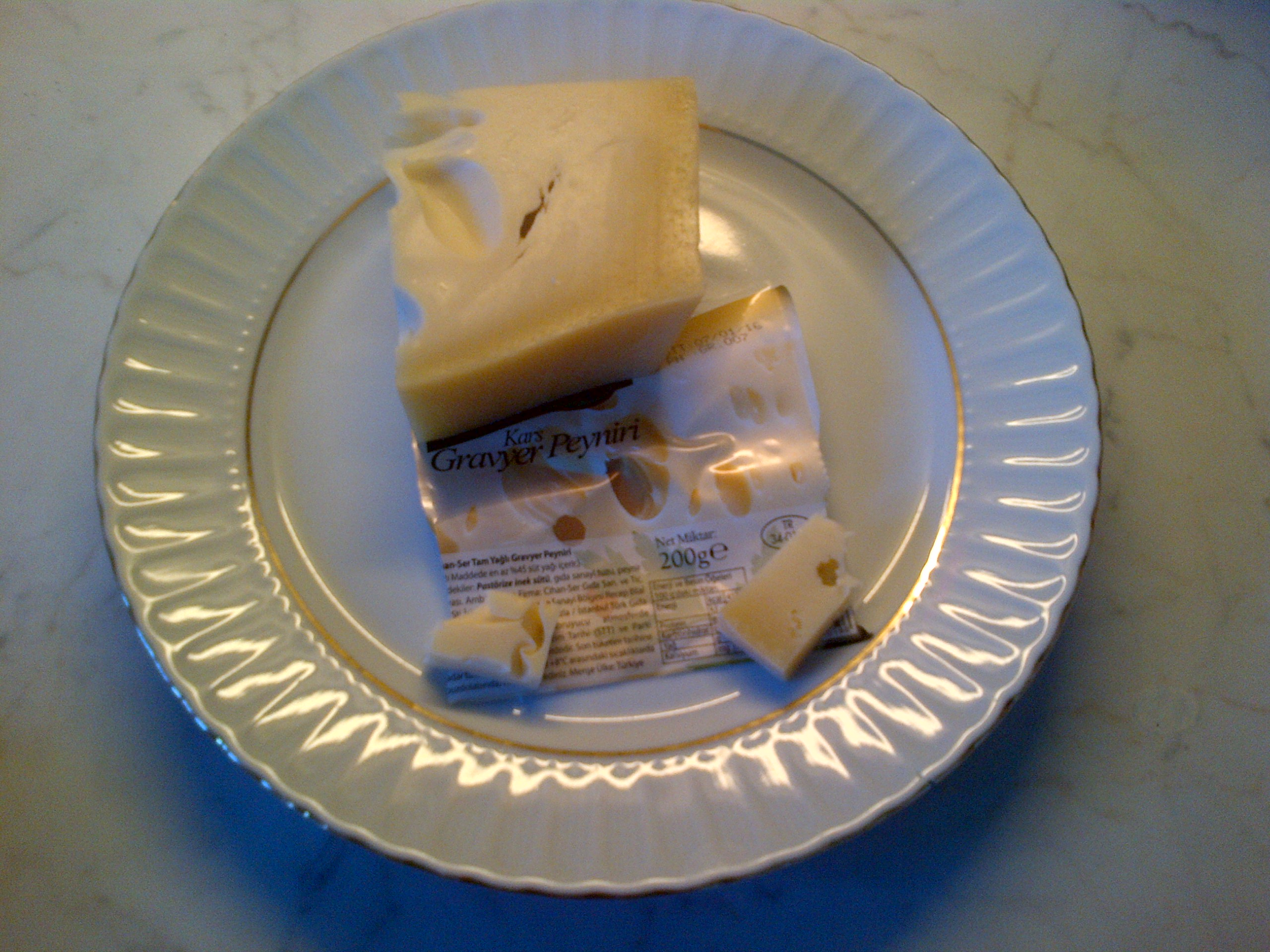
- Other names: Kars Gruyère
- Country of origin: Turkey
- Region: Kars Province
- Town: Kars

Kars gravyer is a Turkish cheese similar to Emmental although its name suggests Gruyère. It is usually made with cow's milk or a mixture of cow and goat's milk. It is usually produced in large wheels weighing 60–70 pounds or more.

Kars gravyer originated in 1878 when David Moser, a Swiss cheese producer, stopped in Boğatepe, and found the region suitable for cheese making. He established a small cheese factory in the village, and soon gravyer production was Boğatepe's main industry.
