= Geçitköy, Akyaka =

Geçitköy
- Village
- Location in Turkey
- Coordinates: 40°46′33″N 43°31′08″E
- Country: Turkey
- Province: Kars
- District: Akyaka
- Elevation: 1,532 m (5,026 ft)
- Population (2023): 325
- Time zone: UTC+3 (TRT)
- Postal code: 36782
- Area code: 0474

Geçitköy is a village in the Akyaka District of Kars Province, Turkey. The village is located 49 km from Kars city center and 11 km from the district center of Akyaka.

== History ==
The village has been known by the same name since 1889.

Following the enactment of Law No. 3392, published in the Official Gazette on July 4, 1987, the village was transferred from the Arpaçay district to the newly established district of Akyaka.

== Population ==
Historical population
Year	Pop.	±% p.a.
1985	698	—
1990	544	−4.86%
1997	412	−3.89%
2007	372	−1.02%
2012	373	+0.05%
2017	375	+0.11%
2023	325	−2.36%
Source: Population censuses (1985-1997) and TÜİK (2007-2023)
