= Kozlu, Kağızman =

Kozlu
- Village
- Location within Turkey
- Coordinates: 40°11′14″N 42°56′54″E
- Country: Turkey
- Province: Kars
- District: Kağızman
- Elevation: 2,044 m (6,706 ft)
- Population (2023): 292
- Time zone: UTC+3 (TRT)
- Postal code: 36700
- Area code: 0474

Kozlu is a village in the Kağızman District of Kars Province, Turkey. The village is located 65 km from the city center of Kars and 22 km from the district center of Kağızman.

== History ==
Kozlu has been known by its current name since 1928.

== Population ==
The village had 249 Turkish residents in 1886.

Historical population
Year	Pop.	±% p.a.
1985	580	—
1990	581	+0.03%
1997	523	−1.49%
2007	505	−0.35%
2012	516	+0.43%
2017	390	−5.45%
2023	292	−4.71%
Source: Population censuses (1985-1997) and TÜİK (2007-2023)
