= Oluklu =

Oluklu (literally "grooved" in Turkish) may refer to the following places in Turkey:

- Oluklu, Adıyaman, a village in the central district of Adyaman Province
- Oluklu, Bayramören
- Oluklu, Kahta, a village in the district of Kâhta, Adıyaman Province
- Büyük Oluklu, Selim, a village in the district of Selim, Kars Province; formerly Oluklu in Kağızman district
- Oluklu, a village in the district of Selim, Kars Province
- Oluklu, Söğüt, a village in the district of Söğüt, Bilecik Province
