= Allium czelghauricum =

Conservation status
- Critically Endangered (IUCN 3.1)

Scientific classification
- Kingdom: Plantae
- Clade: Tracheophytes
- Clade: Angiosperms
- Clade: Monocots
- Order: Asparagales
- Family: Amaryllidaceae
- Subfamily: Allioideae
- Genus: Allium
- Species: A. czelghauricum

Binomial name
- Allium czelghauricum Bordz.

Species of flowering plant

Allium czelghauricum, the Czelghaurian onion, is a species of onion that is found only in Kars Province and Ardahan Province in Turkey. It can be found in montane steppe between elevations of 2,000–2,200 m. It is threatened by overgrazing and hay making.
