= Susuz =

- Municipality
- Location in Turkey
- Coordinates: 40°46′48″N 43°08′07″E
- Country: Turkey
- Province: Kars
- District: Susuz

Government
  - Mayor: Oğuz Yantemur (CHP)
- Elevation: 1,775 m (5,823 ft)
- Population (2022): 2,044
- Time zone: UTC+3 (TRT)
- Postal code: 36760
- Area code: 0474
- Website: karssusuz.bel.tr

Susuz (Turkish: Cılavuz, Kurdish: Cilawûz, Russian: Ново-Дубовка) is a town in Kars Province in the Eastern Anatolia region of Turkey. It is the seat of Susuz District. Its population is 2,044 (2022). Its mayor is Oğuz Yantemur from the Republican People's Party (CHP).

== Geography ==
Lake Aygır is located to the west of the Susuz district center.

== Notable people ==
- Tuncer Bakırhan, Politician
- Qanate Kurdo, Philologist
