= Boğatepe Cheese Museum =

Museum in Turkey

- Boğatepe Peynir Müzesi
- Boğatepe
- Established: 2010; 16 years ago
- Location: Boğatepe, Kars, Turkey
- Coordinates: 40°48′N 42°54′E
- Type: Cheese
- President: İlhan Koçulu
- Owners: Boğatepe Association Environment and Life

Boğatepe Cheese Museum (Turkish: Boğatepe Peynir Müzesi) is a museum in Turkey.

The museum is in Boğatepe (former Zavot) village in Kars Province at 40°48′N 42°54′E close to Turkish state highway D.060. The museum is an abandoned dairy building. It was restored and established as a museum in 2010 .

The village is specialized in cheese production. Kasseri, Gruyère and Chechil are among the many cheese types produced in Boğatepe. However, the European Union standards limit the number of Boğatepe cheese types to three. Accordingly, the number of cheese types produced in dairies decreased to three and the remaining ones face extinction. The museum was established by the Boğatepe Association Environment and Life to keep all types of the cheese alive and to present the stages in cheese production to visitors. United Nations Development Programme (UNDP) also supports the museum.
