= Rohat Alakom =

Kurdish writer (born 1955)

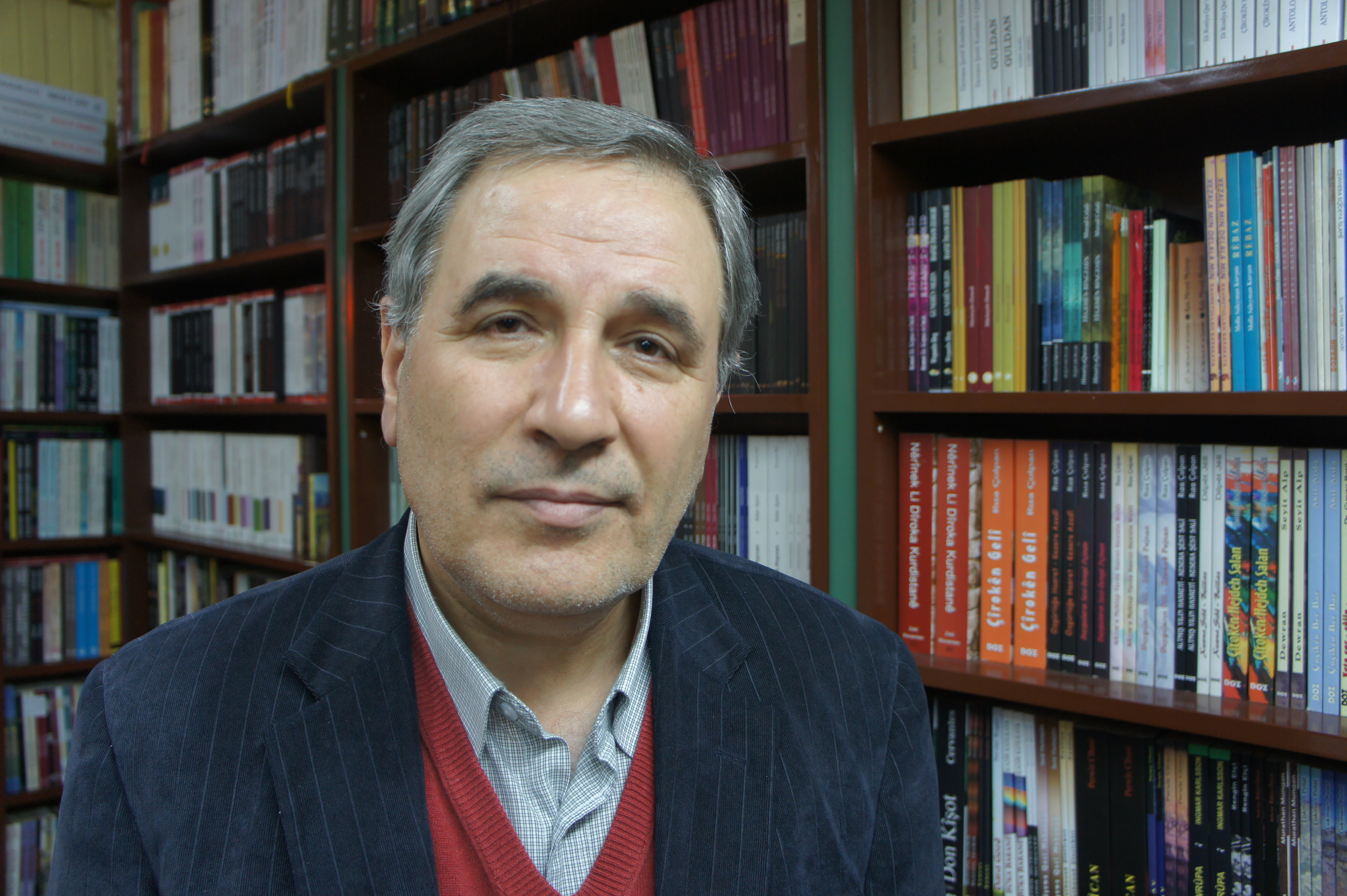
The Kurdish writer Rohat Alakom, 2010

Rohat Alakom (born 1955) is a Kurdish author from Kars, Turkey who writes his books in Kurdish, Turkish and Swedish. He was born in a village of Kağızman a district of Kars Province. He went to high school in Kağızman, Later, he went to the capital of Turkey Ankara for higher education. After living in Bulgaria (1979–1980) and Germany (1980–1982) he moved to Sweden where he currently resides.
