= Astragalus oltensis =

Oltuan astracantha

Conservation status
- Data Deficient (IUCN 3.1)

Scientific classification
- Kingdom: Plantae
- Clade: Tracheophytes
- Clade: Angiosperms
- Clade: Eudicots
- Clade: Rosids
- Order: Fabales
- Family: Fabaceae
- Subfamily: Faboideae
- Genus: Astragalus
- Species: A. oltensis

Binomial name
- Astragalus oltensis Grossh.

Synonyms
- Astracantha oltensis (Grossh.) Podlech

Species of legume

Astragalus oltensis, the Oltuan astracantha, is a species of milkvetch that is endemic to Kars Province in Turkey. It is known only from its type specimen, and has not been collected again since. It was found on stony slopes at about 1,100 m elevation. It is threatened by overgrazing and erosion.
