= Halefoğlu =

Halefoğlu may refer to:

- Halefoğlu, Kars, a village in the central district of Kars Province, Turkey
- Vahit Melih Halefoğlu (1919–2017), Turkish politician and former diplomat
