= Büyük Oluklu, Selim =

Büyük Oluklu
- Village
- Location within Turkey
- Coordinates: 40°19′N 42°53′E
- Country: Turkey
- Province: Kars
- District: Selim
- Elevation: 2,030 m (6,660 ft)
- Population (2022): 1,220
- Time zone: UTC+3 (TRT)
- Area code: 0474

Büyük Oluklu (also: Büyükoluklu or Oluklu) is a village in the Selim District of Kars Province, Turkey. Its population is 1,220 (2022). It is situated in high plains. The distance to Selim is 25 kilometres (16 mi) and to Kars is 45 kilometres (28 mi). Up to 2011 Oluklu was a village in Kağızman district. But it was closer to Selim and hence in April 2011, the province council decided to change the administrative status of Oluklu which disappointed Kağızman residents. The village was named Büyük Oluklu as there is another Oluklu in Selim District.
