= Susuz District =

District of Kars Province, Turkey

- District
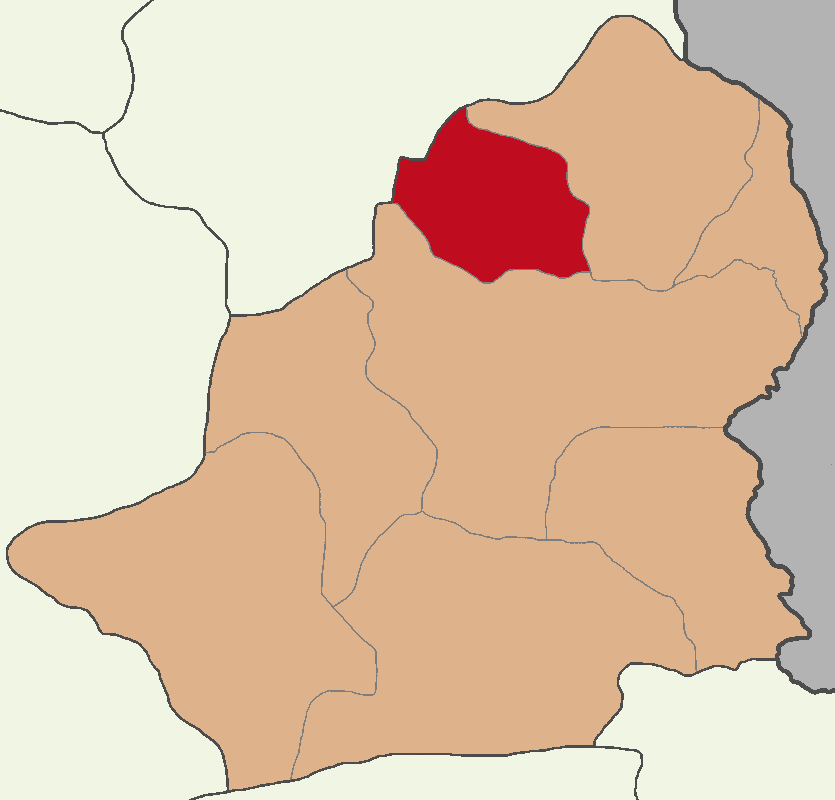
- Map showing Susuz District in Kars Province

- Location in Turkey
- Coordinates: 40°47′N 43°08′E
- Country: Turkey
- Province: Kars
- Seat: Susuz

Government
  - Kaymakam: Onur Yılmazer
- Area: 578 km^{2} (223 sq mi)
- Population (2022): 9,260
  - Density: 16/km^{2} (41/sq mi)
- Time zone: UTC+3 (TRT)
- Website: www.susuz.gov.tr

Susuz District is a district of the Kars Province of Turkey. Its seat is the town of Susuz. Its area is 578 km^{2}, and its population is 9,260 (2022).

== Geography ==
There is Lake Aygır to the west of the Susuz district center.

== Composition ==
There is one municipality in Susuz District:

- Susuz

There are 27 villages in Susuz District:

- Aksu
- Aynalı
- Büyük Çatak
- Çamçavuş
- Çığrıklı
- Doyumlu
- Erdağı
- Ermişler
- Gölbaşı
- Harmanlı
- Incesu
- Incilipınar
- Kalecik
- Karapınar
- Kayadibi
- Kayalık
- Keçili
- Kırçiçeği
- Kırkpınar
- Kiziroğlu
- Kurugöl
- Küçükçatak
- Ortalar
- Porsuklu
- Taşlıca
- Yaylacık
- Yolboyu
