= Kozluca, Kars =

Kozluca
- Village
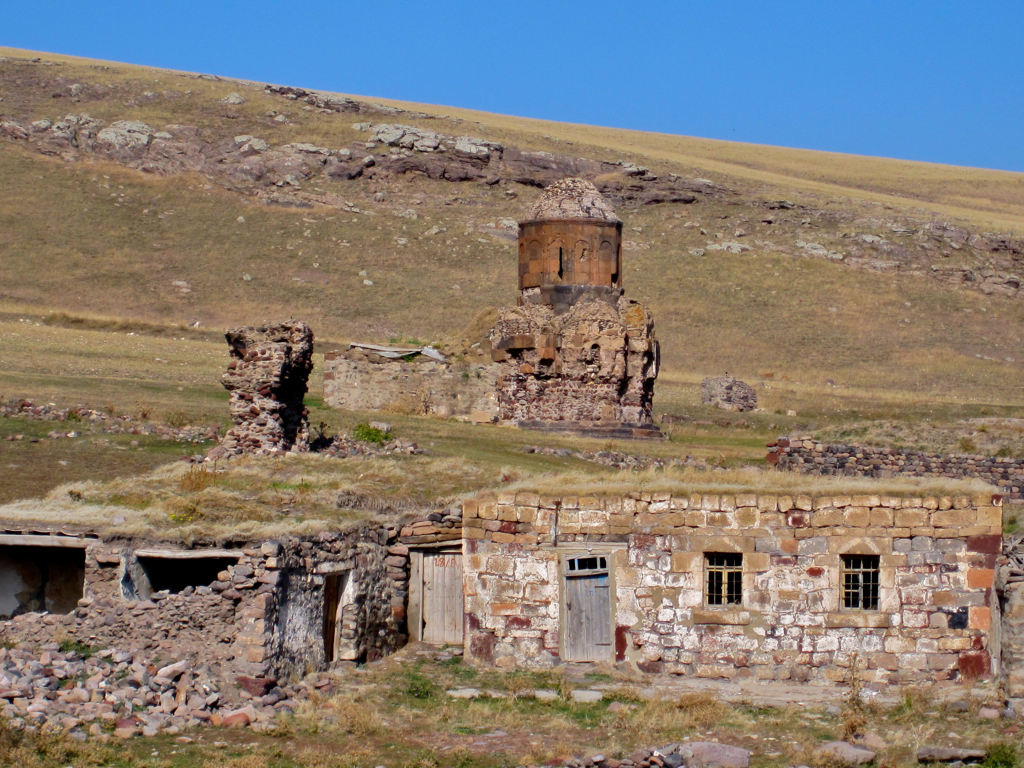

- Location within Turkey
- Coordinates: 40°30′46″N 43°29′09″E
- Country: Turkey
- Province: Kars
- District: Kars
- Elevation: 1,788 m (5,866 ft)
- Population (2023): 102
- Time zone: UTC+3 (TRT)
- Postal code: 36000
- Area code: 0474

Kozluca (Armenian: Ղոզլուջա) is a village in the Kars District of Kars Province, Turkey. Its population is 102 (2023).

The village houses the remains of the Armenian Bagnayr Monastery, built in the 10th century CE. The name "Bagnayr" means "cave of fire altars", suggesting the much earlier presence of a Zoroastrian sanctuary on the site.

== Bagnayr monastery ==
According to Armenian sources Vahram Pahlavouni founded the monastery in the year 989. It was probably abandoned at the end of the 13th century. Currently, only one of the original buildings of the complex, the Küçük Kozluca Church, remains partially preserved. This six-foil domed church has lost all of the coverings, and almost all of the exterior stone blocks have been scavenged, but the structure remains intact.

Two walls and an arch vaulted door remain, but the annular vault of the door is ruined. At the internal section of the remaining walls, 5 arches and 5 dummy columns are interconnected and epitaphs are placed in between the columns. The middle dome and north wall of the church are collapsed and only 2 columns have remained. The top of the remaining south walls is decorated with geometrical designs in carving technique.

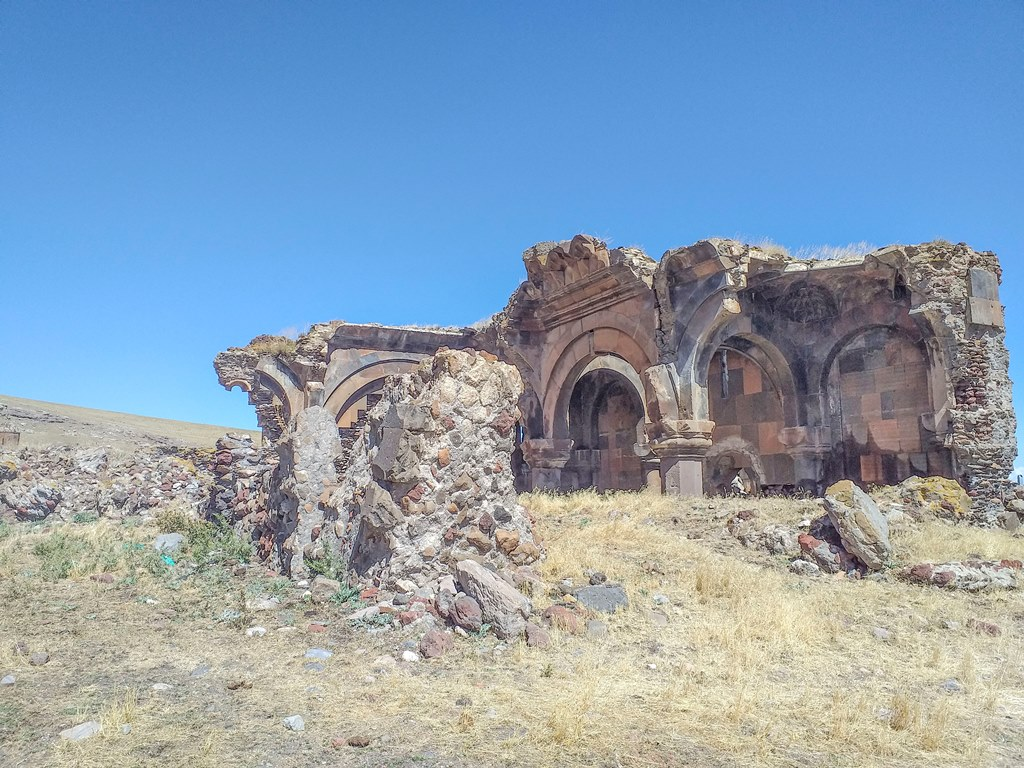
Küçük Kozluca Church

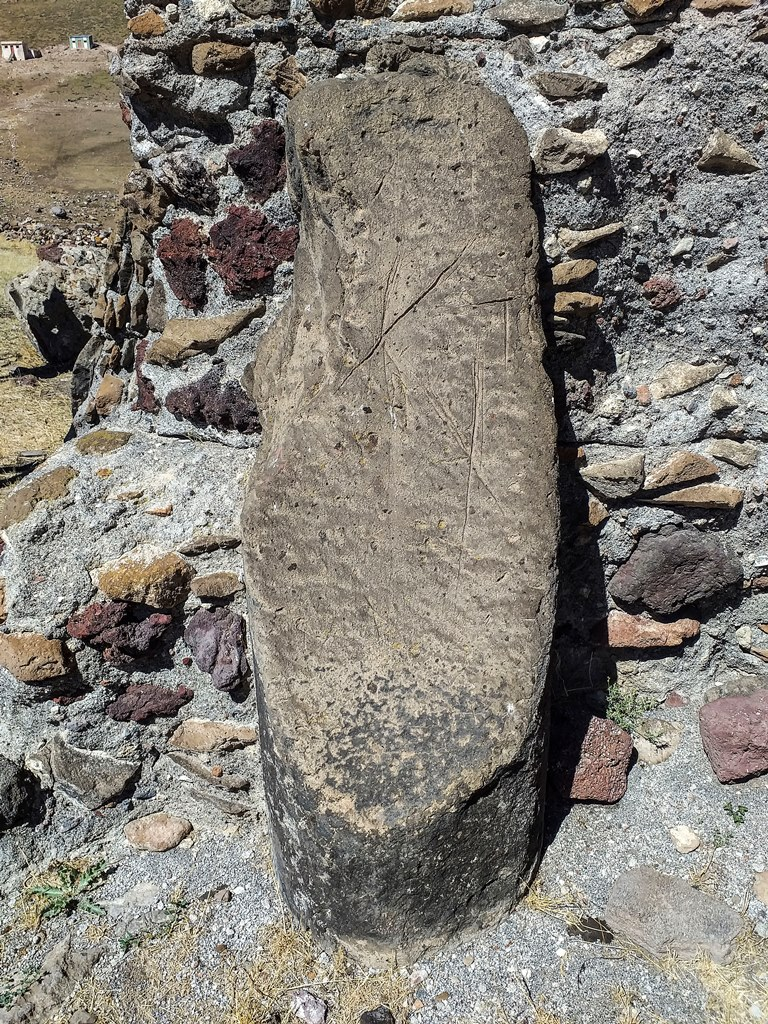
Petroglyph with Zoroastrian symbols
