= Qanate Kurdo =

Kurdish philologist (1909-1985)

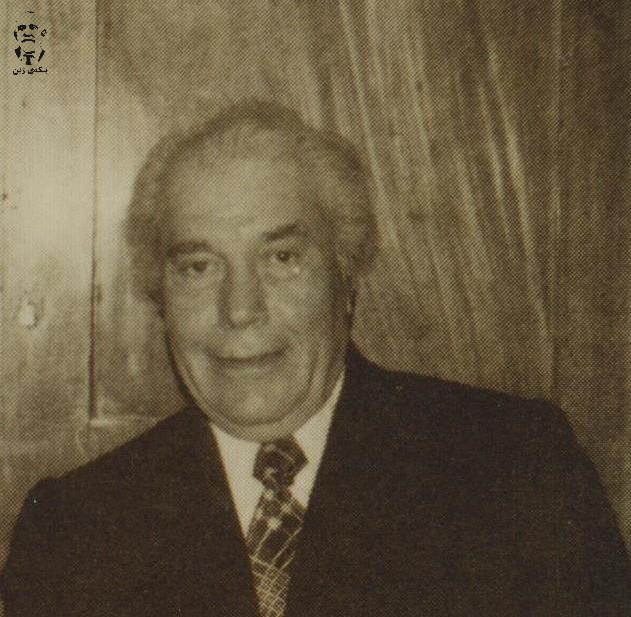
- Born: 12 September 1909; Kars Oblast, Russian Empire
- Died: 31 October 1985 (aged 76); Leningrad, Soviet Union

Qanate Kurdo (Kurdish: Qanatê Kurdo, Russian: Кана́т Кала́шевич Курдо́ев, romanized: Kanat Kalashevich Kurdoev; 12 September 1909 – 31 October 1985) was a Soviet philologist and professor of the Kurdish language. He was born in Susuz, then part of the Russian Empire, and attended a Kurdish school in Tiflis (Tbilisi). He received a scholarship to pursue a higher education at the University of Leningrad and developed Kurdish studies in various fields.

== Biography ==
Qanate Kurdo was born in the village of Susuz, then part of the Kars oblast of the Russian Empire, now located in Turkey. He was from the Yazidi tribe of Şerqîyan which, along with other Yazidi tribes, fled Ottoman oppression in 1918 (Kars oblast was ceded to the Ottomans in March of that year) and settled in the Aparan district of Armenia. The Turkish invasion of Armenia caused them to flee again, this time to Tiflis (Tbilisi, Georgia). In 1921, he met Hakob ("Lazo") and Olga Ghazarian, the founders of the first Kurdish school in Tiflis. In 1928, he became one of the first of Lazo's students who were sent to receive a higher education in Leningrad on a scholarship from the Central Committee of the Armenian Communist Party. The scholarships were granted at the initiative of the Kurdish author Arab Shamilov (Erebe Shemo). He attended the Language, History and Literature Department of University of Leningrad. His teachers included the Iranologist Alexander Freiman and the orientalist Joseph Orbeli. He studied the Baluchi and Pamir languages with Ivan Zarubin and Nikolai Marr. He received his PhD in 1941. He fought in World War II and was wounded. When the war was reaching its end, Kurdo became part of the Faculty of Oriental Studies in Leningrad, where he taught Kurdish in the Department of Iranian Studies. In 1961, he became the head of the new Kurdology section (Kurdsky kabinet) of the Institute of Asian Peoples of the Soviet Academy of Sciences in Leningrad, established by Joseph Orbeli in 1959.

== See also ==
- List of Kurdish philosophers
