= Kağızman District =

District of Kars Province, Turkey

- District
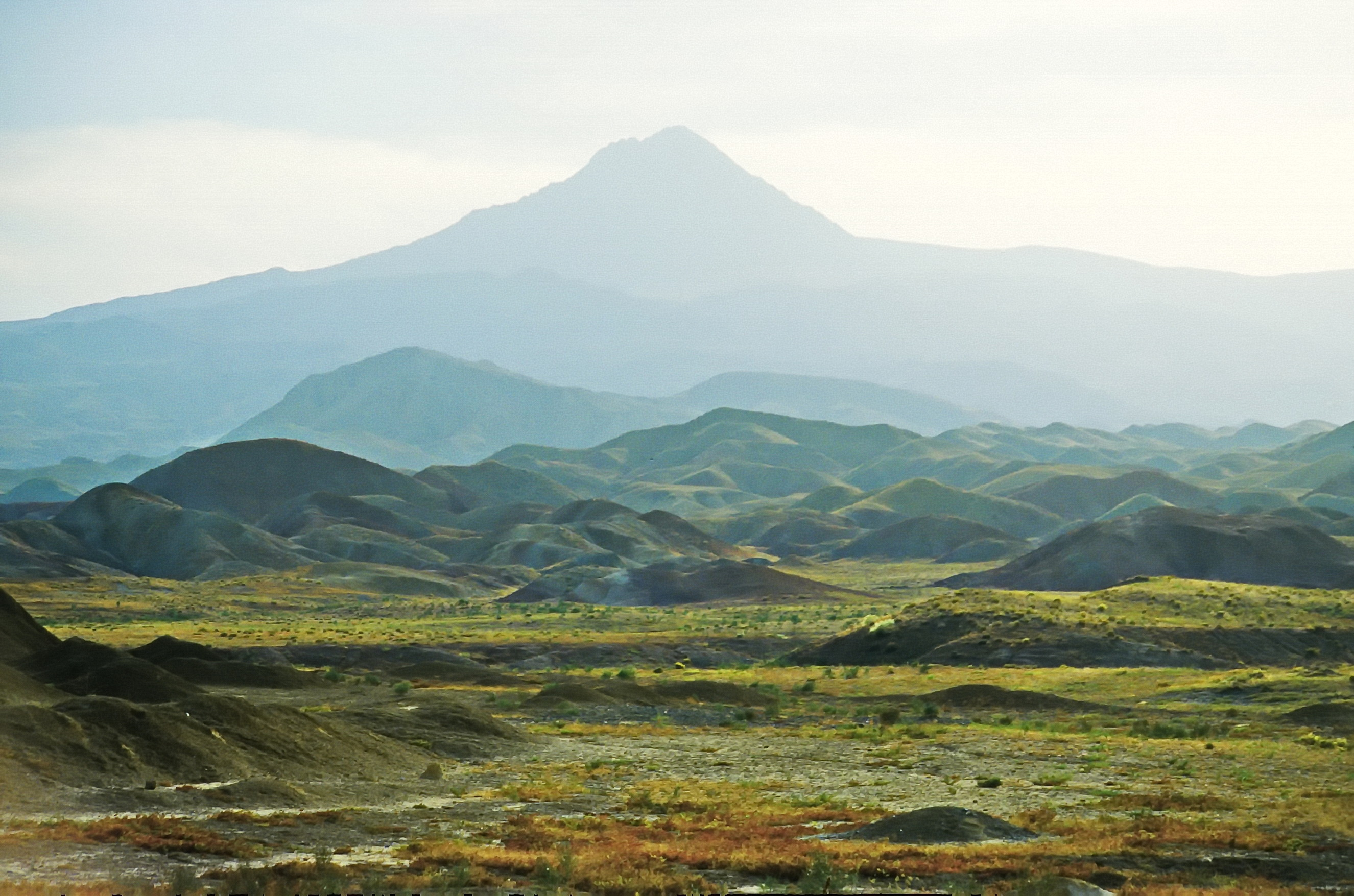
- Mt. Aşağı and the Aras Valley, Kağızman

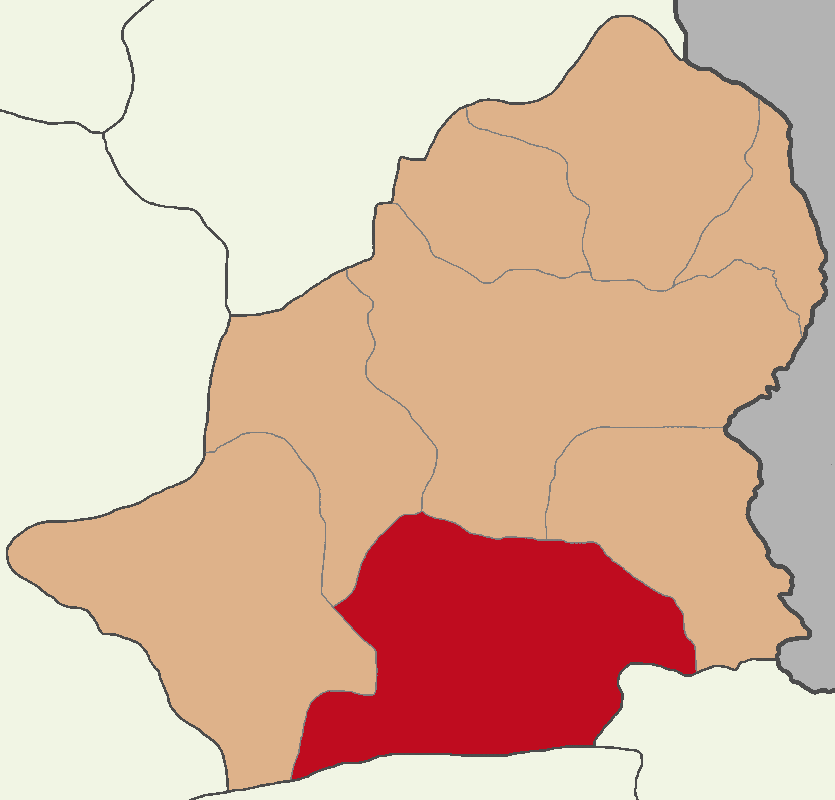
- Map showing Kağızman District in Kars Province

- Location within Turkey
- Coordinates: 40°09′N 43°08′E
- Country: Turkey
- Province: Kars
- Seat: Kağızman

Government
  - Kaymakam: Okan Daştan
- Area: 1,871 km^{2} (722 sq mi)
- Population (2022): 44,178
  - Density: 23.61/km^{2} (61.15/sq mi)
- Time zone: UTC+3 (TRT)
- Website: www.kagizman.gov.tr

Kağızman District is a district of the Kars Province of Turkey. Its seat is the town of Kağızman. Its area is 1,871 km^{2}, and its population is 44,178 (2022).

== Composition ==
There is one municipality in Kağızman District:

- Kağızman

There are 62 villages in Kağızman District:

- Akçakale
- Akçay
- Akdam
- Akören
- Akyayla
- Altıngedik
- Aşağı Karagüney
- Aşağıdut
- Aydınkavak
- Bücüklü
- Bulanık
- Çallı
- Camuşlu
- Çayarası
- Çaybük
- Çengilli
- Çeperli
- Çiçekli
- Çilehane
- Çukurayva
- Değirmendere
- Denizgölü
- Devebük
- Dibekkaya
- Donandı
- Duranlar
- Esenkır
- Evyapan
- Görecek
- Gümüştepe
- Günindi
- Günindiyaylası
- Güvendik
- Karabağ
- Karaboncuk
- Karacaören
- Karakale
- Karakuş
- Keşişkıran
- Kömürlü
- Körpınar
- Kötek
- Kozlu
- Kuloğlu
- Kuruyayla
- Ortaköy
- Paslı
- Şabanköy
- Sağbaş
- Sesveren
- Taşbilek
- Taşburun
- Tomruktaş
- Tunçkaya
- Ürker
- Yağlıca
- Yalnızağaç
- Yankıpınar
- Yellikıran
- Yenice
- Yolkorur
- Yukarı Karagüney
