= Gülyüzü, Arpaçay =

Coordinates: 40°59′27″N 43°13′17″E

Gülyüzü is a village in Arpaçay District of Kars Province, Turkey.

The settlement area of Alvana, a village that has been abandoned, is within the borders of Gülyüzü village.
