= Kars District =

District of Kars Province, Turkey

- District
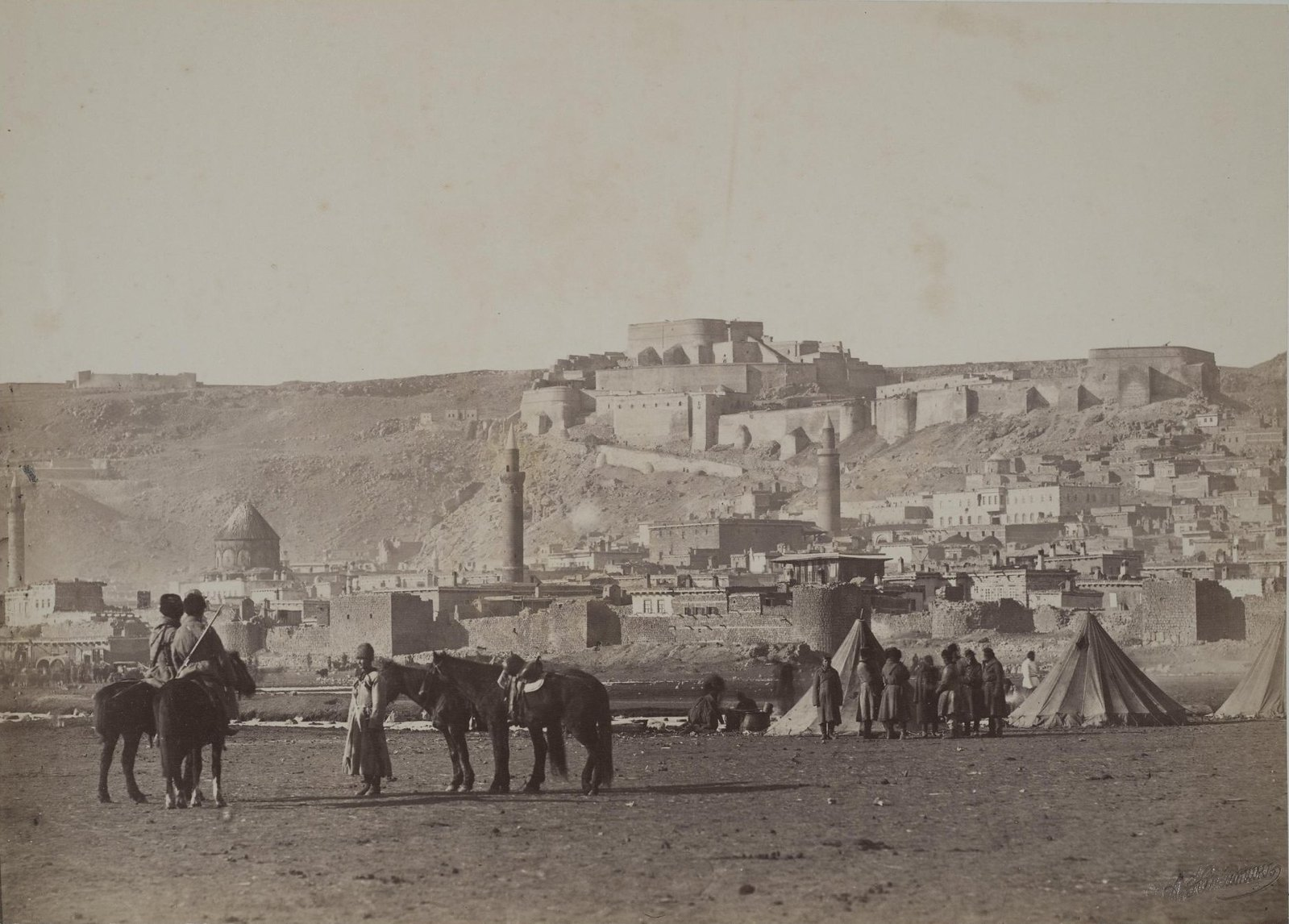
- District seat Kars in 1870's

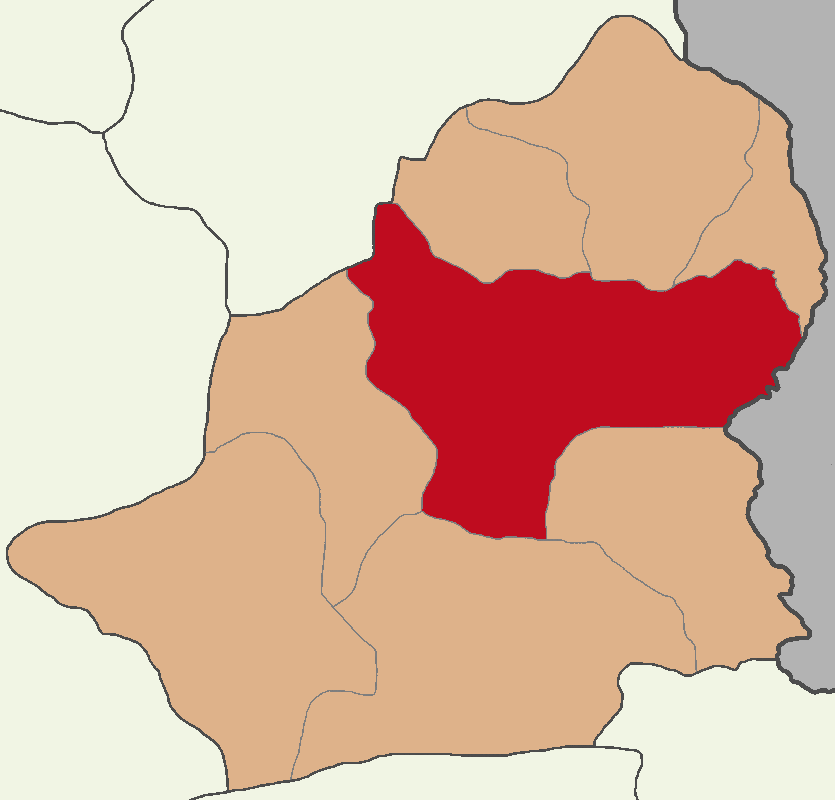
- Map showing Kars District in Kars Province

- Location within Turkey
- Coordinates: 40°36′N 43°06′E
- Country: Turkey
- Province: Kars
- Seat: Kars
- Area: 2,048 km^{2} (791 sq mi)
- Population (2022): 117,235
  - Density: 57.24/km^{2} (148.3/sq mi)
- Time zone: UTC+3 (TRT)

Kars District (also: Merkez, meaning "central" in Turkish) is a district of the Kars Province of Turkey. Its seat is the city of Kars. Its area is 2,048 km^{2}, and its population is 117,235 (2022).

== Composition ==
There is one municipality in Kars District:

- Kars

There are 72 villages in Kars District:

- Ağadeve
- Akbaba
- Akdere
- Alaca
- Alçılı
- Ani
- Arazoğlu
- Arslanizi
- Ataköy
- Atayurt
- Ayakgedikler
- Aydınalan
- Azat
- Başgedikler
- Başkaya
- Bayraktar
- Bekler
- Boğatepe
- Boğazköy
- Borluk
- Bozkale
- Bulanık
- Büyük Aküzüm
- Çağlayan
- Çakmak
- Çamurlu
- Çerme
- Çığırgan
- Çorak
- Cumhuriyet
- Davulköy
- Derecik
- Dikme
- Esenkent
- Esenyazı
- Eşmeyazı
- Gelirli
- Güdeli
- Hacıhalil
- Hacıveli
- Halefoğlu
- Hamzagerek
- Hapanlı
- Hasçiftlik
- Karacaören
- Karaçoban
- Karakaş
- Kocabahçe
- Kozluca
- Küçükboğatepe
- Küçükpirveli
- Küçükyusuf
- Külveren
- Kümbetli
- Maksutçuk
- Merkezkarakale
- Mezraa
- Oğuzlu
- Ölçülü
- Ortagedikler
- Söğütlü
- Soylu
- Subatan
- Tazekent
- Tekneli
- Üçbölük
- Verimli
- Yağıkesen
- Yalçınlar
- Yalınkaya
- Yılanlı
- Yücelen
