= Koçköy =

- Village
- Location within Turkey
- Coordinates: 40°52′N 43°31′E
- Country: Turkey
- Province: Kars
- District: Arpaçay
- Elevation: 1,810 m (5,940 ft)
- Population (2022): 818
- Time zone: UTC+3 (TRT)
- Postal code: 36740
- Area code: 0474

Koçköy is a village in Arpaçay District of Kars Province, Turkey. Its population is 818 (2022). Before the 2013 reorganisation, it was a town (belde). The village is populated by Karapapakhs.
