= Akyaka District =

District of Kars Province, Turkey

- District
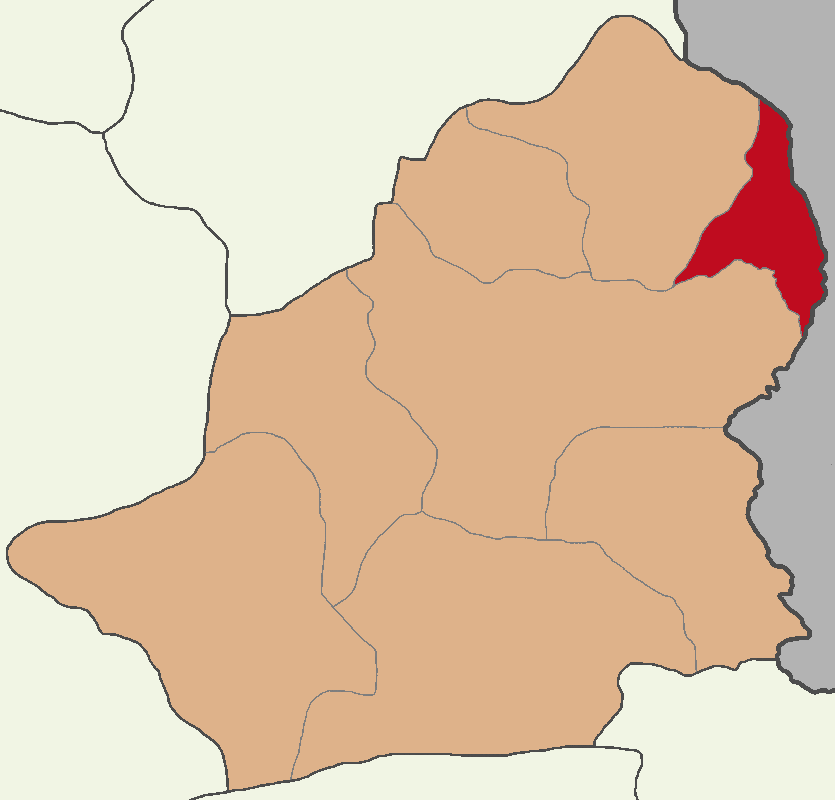
- Map showing Akyaka District in Kars Province

- Location within Turkey
- Coordinates: 40°45′N 43°38′E
- Country: Turkey
- Province: Kars
- Seat: Akyaka

Government
  - Kaymakam: Selçuk Köksal
- Area: 417 km^{2} (161 sq mi)
- Population (2022): 9,977
  - Density: 23.9/km^{2} (62.0/sq mi)
- Time zone: UTC+3 (TRT)
- Website: www.akyaka.gov.tr

Akyaka District is a district of the Kars Province of Turkey. Its seat is the town of Akyaka. Its area is 417 km^{2}, and its population is 9,977 (2022).

Azerbaijanis of the Qarapapaq tribe form the majority of the District.

== Composition ==
There is one municipality in Akyaka District:

- Akyaka

There are 27 villages in Akyaka District:

- Akbulak
- Aslanhane
- Boyuntaş
- Büyükdurduran
- Büyükpirveli
- Camuşlu
- Cebeci
- Çetindurak
- Demirkent
- Duraklı
- Esenyayla
- Geçitköy
- Hacıpiri
- İbişköy
- İncedere
- Kalkankale
- Karahan
- Kayadöven
- Kayaköprü
- Küçükaküzüm
- Küçükdurduran
- Kürekdere
- Şahnalar
- Sulakbahçe
- Süngüderesi
- Üçpınar
- Yerlikavak
