= Kümbetli =

- Village
- Location within Turkey
- Coordinates: 40°33′N 43°00′E
- Country: Turkey
- Province: Kars
- District: Kars
- Elevation: 1,760 m (5,770 ft)
- Population (2022): 1,361
- Time zone: UTC+3 (TRT)
- Postal code: 36900
- Area code: 0474

Kümbetli is a village in the Kars District, Kars Province, Turkey. Its population is 1,361 (2022). The village is populated by the Karapapakh.
