= Taşlıca, Susuz =

Taşlıca
- Village
- Location in Turkey
- Coordinates: 40°45′51″N 43°02′47″E
- Country: Turkey
- Province: Kars
- District: Susuz
- Elevation: 2,044 m (6,706 ft)
- Population (2023): 182
- Time zone: UTC+3 (TRT)
- Postal code: 36762
- Area code: 0474

Taşlıca is a village in the Susuz District of Kars Province, Turkey. The village is located 33 km from the city of Kars and 13 km from the district center of Susuz.

== History ==
The village was formerly known as Karakale according to records from the years 1889 and 1928.

== Population ==
Historical population
Year	Pop.	±% p.a.
1985	652	—
1990	498	−5.25%
1997	355	−4.72%
2007	326	−0.85%
2012	294	−2.05%
2017	232	−4.63%
2023	182	−3.96%
Source: Population censuses (1985-1997) and TÜİK (2007-2023)
