= Selim, Kars =

Selim
- Municipality
- Location in Turkey
- Coordinates: 40°27′48″N 42°47′09″E
- Country: Turkey
- Province: Kars
- District: Selim

Government
  - Mayor: Coşkun Altun (AKP)
- Elevation: 1,857 m (6,093 ft)
- Population (2022): 5,563
- Time zone: UTC+3 (TRT)
- Postal code: 36900
- Area code: 0474
- Website: www.selim.bel.tr

Selim (Ottoman Turkish: سليم, Kurdish: Selim, Russian: Ново-Селим) is a town in Kars Province in the Eastern Anatolia region of Turkey. It is the seat of Selim District. Its population is 5,563 (2022). The mayor is Coşkun Altun (AKP).
