= Lake Aygır (Kars) =

Lake in Turkey

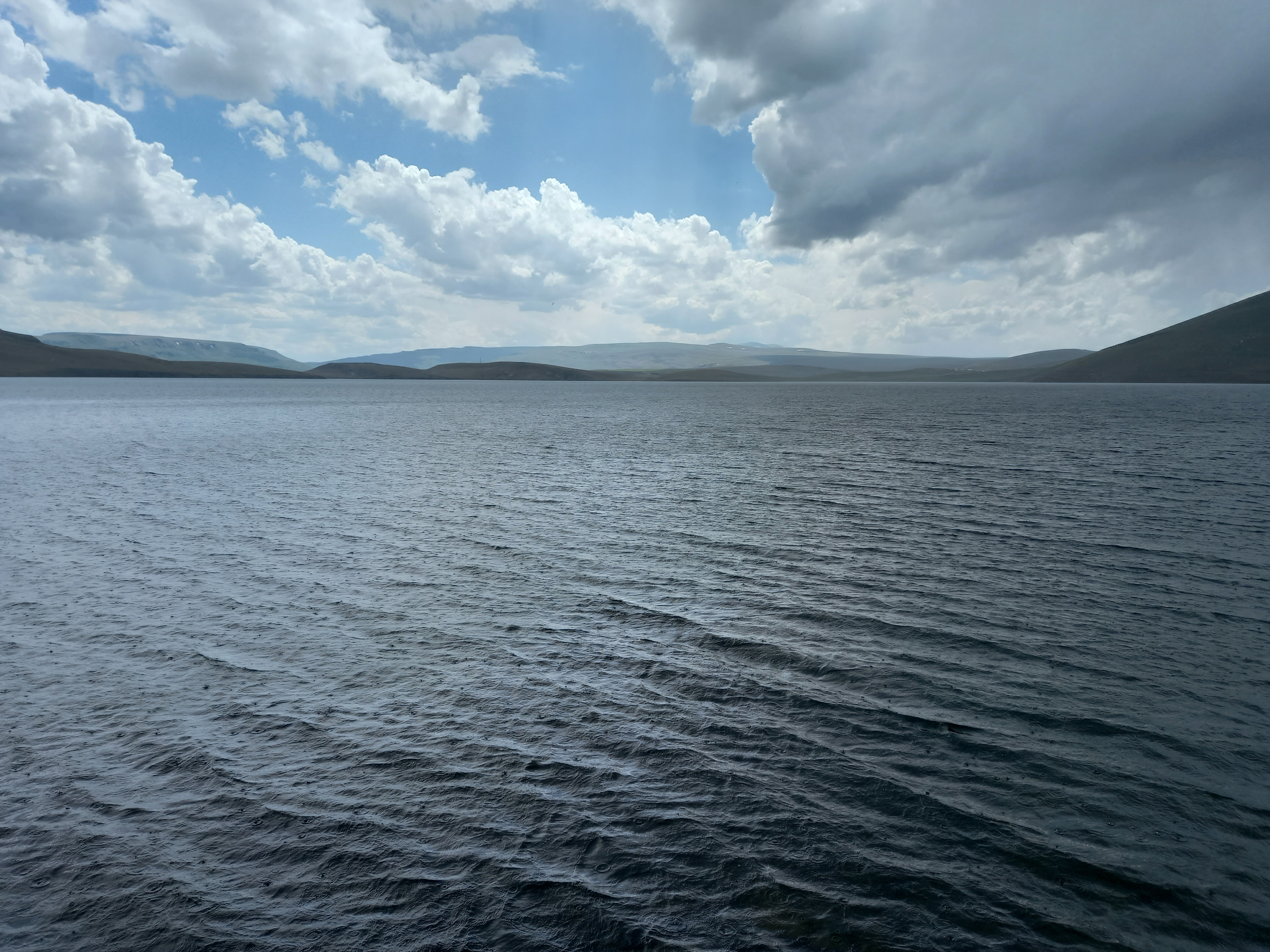

- Location within Turkey
- Location: Susuz, Kars Province
- Coordinates: 40.76358°N 43.00668°E
- Lake type: Freshwater, Volcanic dam
- Basin countries: Turkey
- Surface elevation: 2.106 m (6 ft 10.9 in)

Lake Aygır (Turkish: Aygır Gölü) is a lake in the Susuz district of Kars province.

== Geology and geomorphology ==
Aygır Lake is a small lava dam and freshwater lake formed on volcanic rocks. It is 13 kilometers away from Kars center.
