= Arpaçay =

Arpaçay Զարիշատ • Zaruşat
- Municipality
- Location in Turkey
- Coordinates: 40°50′54″N 43°19′54″E
- Country: Turkey
- Province: Kars
- District: Arpaçay

Government
  - Mayor: Erçetin Altay (AKP)
- Elevation: 1,675 m (5,495 ft)
- Population (2022): 2,344
- Time zone: UTC+3 (TRT)
- Postal code: 36730
- Area code: 0474
- Website: www.arpacay.bel.tr

Arpaçay (Armenian: Զարիշատ, romanized: Zarishat) is a town in Kars Province in the Eastern Anatolia region of Turkey. It is the seat of Arpaçay District. It has a population of 2,344 (2022). The mayor is Erçetin Altay (AKP). The town is populated by Karapapakhs.

== Notable natives ==
- Azer Bülbül, singer

== See also ==
- Lake Kuyucuk
