= Selim District =

District of Kars Province, Turkey

- District
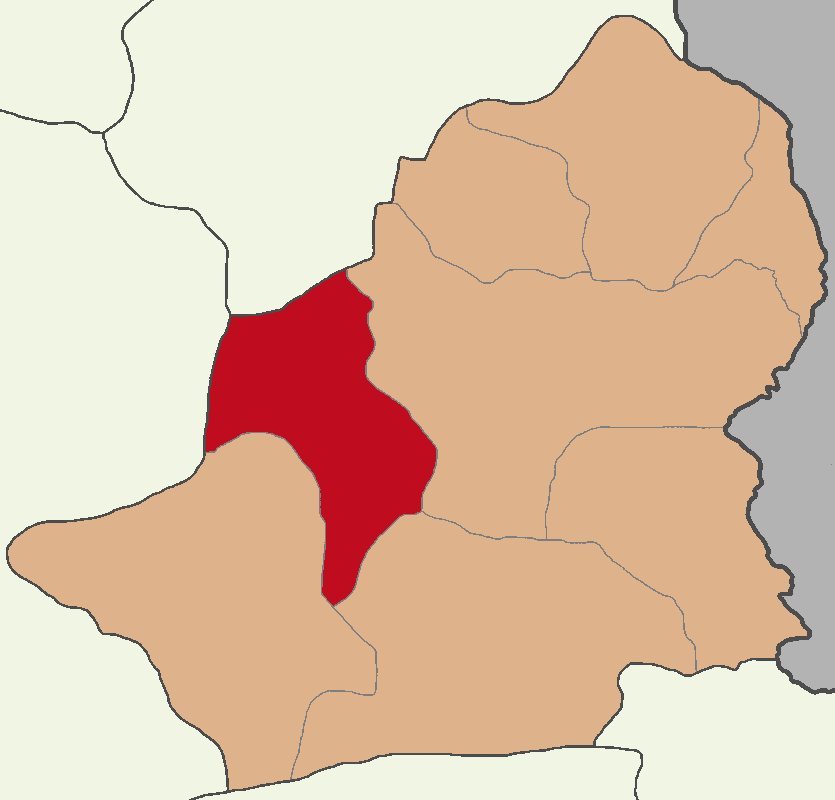
- Map showing Selim District in Kars Province

- Location in Turkey
- Coordinates: 40°28′N 42°47′E
- Country: Turkey
- Province: Kars
- Seat: Selim

Government
  - Kaymakam: Mubin Demirkıran
- Area: 982 km^{2} (379 sq mi)
- Population (2022): 21,488
  - Density: 21.9/km^{2} (56.7/sq mi)
- Time zone: UTC+3 (TRT)
- Website: www.selim.gov.tr

Selim District is a district of the Kars Province of Turkey. Its seat is the town of Selim. Its area is 982 km^{2}, and its population is 21,488 (2022).

== Composition ==
There is one municipality in Selim District:

- Selim

There are 53 villages in Selim District:

- Akçakale
- Akpınar
- Akyar
- Alisofu
- Aşağıdamlapınar
- Aşağıkotanlı
- Başköy
- Bayburt
- Baykara
- Benliahmet
- Beyköy
- Bölükbaş
- Bozkuş
- Büyük Oluklu
- Büyükdere
- Cavlak
- Çaybaşı
- Çıplaklı
- Darboğaz
- Dölbentli
- Eskigazi
- Eskigeçit
- Gelinalan
- Gürbüzler
- Hasbey
- İğdir
- Kamışlı
- Karaçayır
- Karahamza
- Karakale
- Katranlı
- Kaynarlı
- Kekeç
- Kırkpınar
- Koşapınar
- Koyunyurdu
- Laloğlu
- Mollamustafa
- Oluklu
- Ortakale
- Sarıgün
- Söğütlü
- Tozluca
- Tuygun
- Yalnızçam
- Yamaçlı
- Yassıca
- Yaylacık
- Yenice
- Yeşiltepe
- Yolgeçmez
- Yukarıdamlapınar
- Yukarıkotanlı
