= Halefoğlu, Kars =

Halefoğlu
- Village
- Location within Turkey
- Coordinates: 40°39′N 43°18′E
- Country: Turkey
- Province: Kars
- District: Kars
- Elevation: 1,870 m (6,140 ft)
- Population (2022): 2,374
- Time zone: UTC+3 (TRT)
- Postal code: 36900
- Area code: 0474

Halefoğlu is a village in the Kars District, Kars Province, Turkey. Its population is 2,374 (2022).
