= Palakatsio =

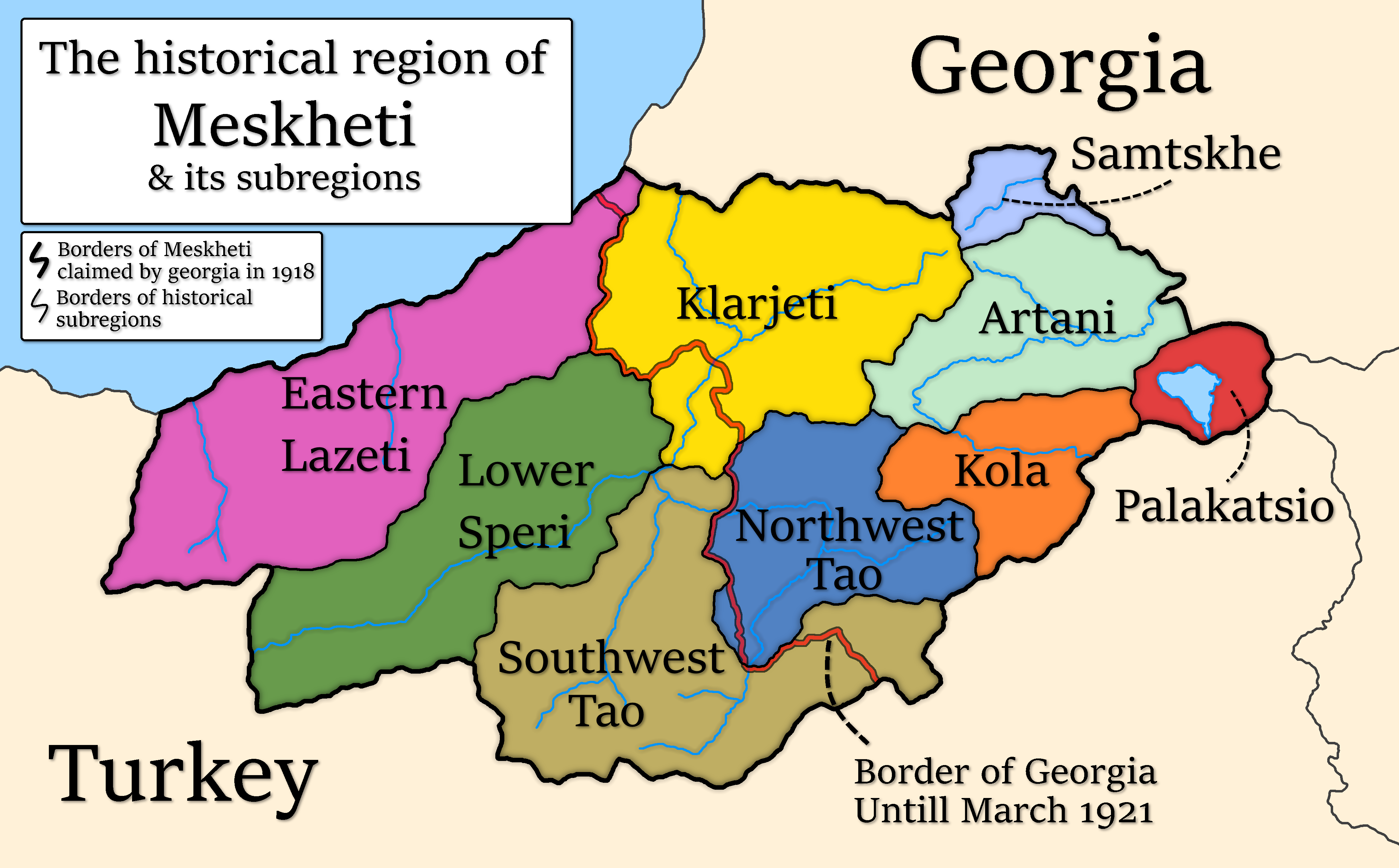

Palakatsio (Georgian: პალაკაციო) is a historical region located in the southern part of historical Georgia, within the borders of present-day Turkey. Lake Çıldır was also formerly known as Lake Palakatsio. The Palakatsio region encompassed the area surrounding Lake Çıldır, approximately the area of today's Çıldır District.

In the late 12th century, Palakatsio formed a fringe of the Javakheti principality. Later, it was part of the Samtskhe-Saatabago. In 1578, the Ottomans captured the region and established the Childir Liva (Liva-i Çıldır), part of the Georgian Vilayet (Vilayet-i Gürcistan), on this land.
