= Arpaçay District =

District of Kars Province, Turkey

- District
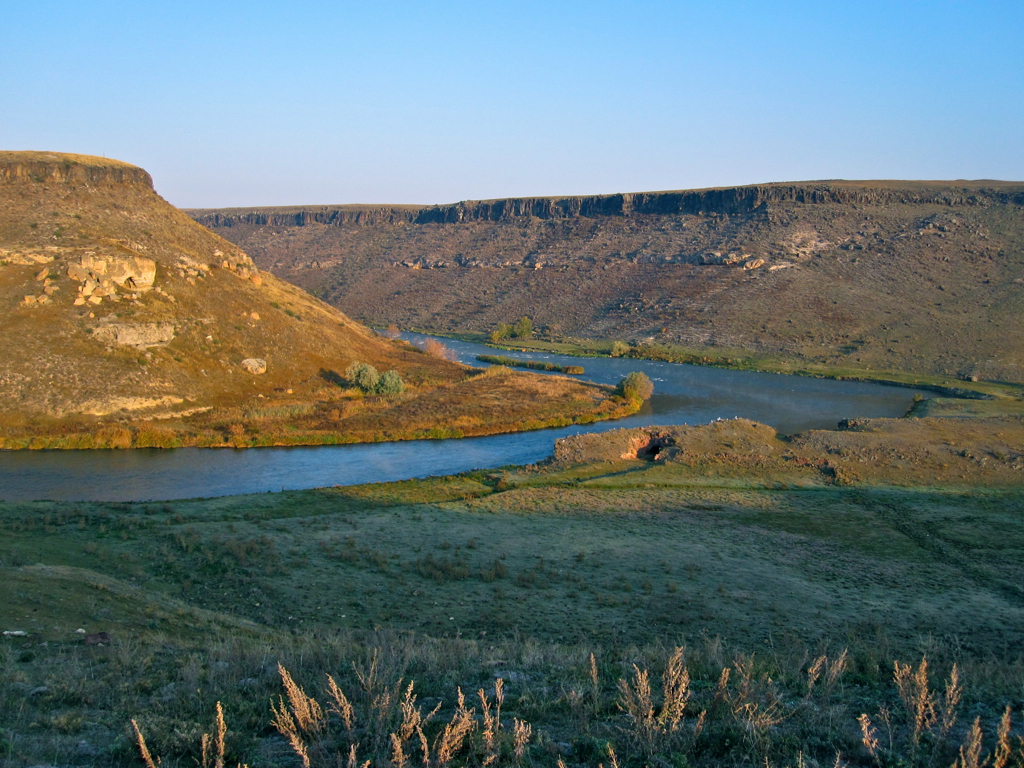
- Arpaçay (Arpa Stream), with Armenia on the left, Turkey on the right

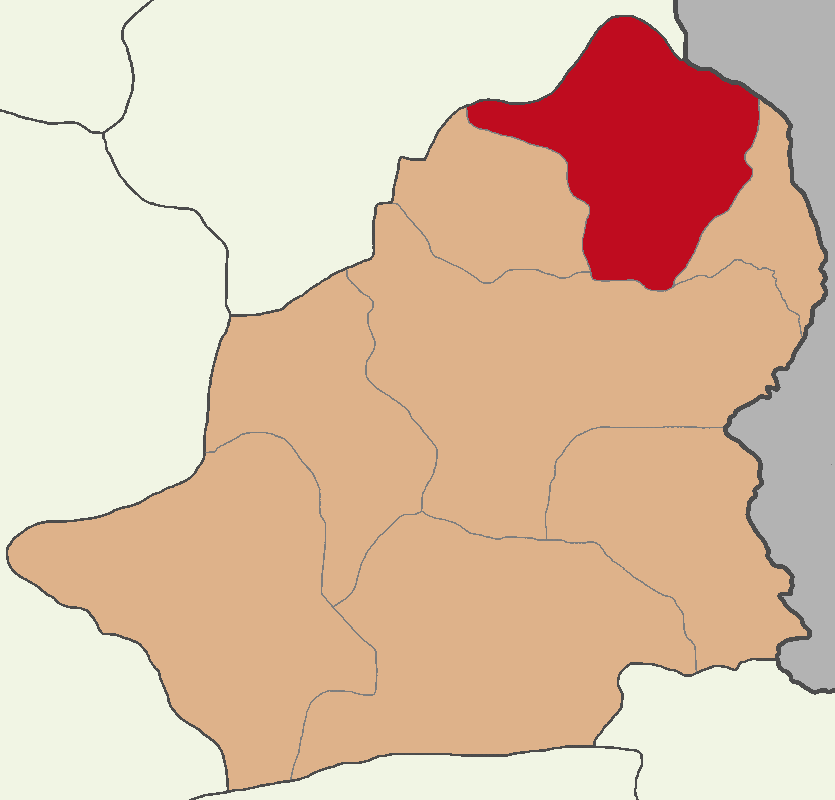
- Map showing Arpaçay District in Kars Province

- Location within Turkey
- Coordinates: 40°51′N 43°20′E
- Country: Turkey
- Province: Kars
- Seat: Arpaçay

Government
  - Kaymakam: Mustafa Uğur Özerden
- Area: 1,165 km^{2} (450 sq mi)
- Population (2022): 15,075
  - Density: 12.94/km^{2} (33.51/sq mi)
- Time zone: UTC+3 (TRT)
- Website: www.arpacay.gov.tr

Arpaçay District is a district of the Kars Province of Turkey. Its seat is the town of Arpaçay. Its area is 1,165 km^{2}, and its population is 15,075 (2022).

More than half of the villages are populated by the Karapapakh.

== Composition ==
There is one municipality in Arpaçay District:

- Arpaçay

There are 48 villages in Arpaçay District:

- Akçakale
- Akçalar
- Akmazdam
- Arslanoğlu
- Atcılar
- Aydıngün
- Bacıoğlu
- Bardaklı
- Bozyiğit
- Burçalı
- Büyük Çatma
- Çanaksu
- Carcı
- Carcıoğlu
- Dağköyü
- Değirmenköprü
- Doğruyol
- Gediksatılmış
- Göldalı
- Gönülalan
- Gülyüzü
- Güvercin
- Hasançavuş
- Kakaç
- Karakale
- Karaurgan
- Kardeştepe
- Kıraç
- Koçköy
- Küçük Boğaz
- Küçük Çatma
- Kuyucuk
- Kuzgunlu
- Kümbet
- Melikköyü
- Mescitli
- Meydancık
- Okçuoğlu
- Polatköyü
- Söğütlü
- Taşbaşı
- Taşdere
- Taşköprü
- Taşlıağıl
- Telek
- Tepecik
- Tepeköy
- Tomarlı
