= Boğatepe, Kars =

Boğatepe
- Village
- Location within Turkey
- Coordinates: 40°48′N 42°54′E
- Country: Turkey
- Province: Kars
- District: Kars
- Elevation: 2,667 m (8,750 ft)
- Population (2022): 183
- Time zone: UTC+3 (TRT)
- Postal code: 36900
- Area code: 0474

Boğatepe (former Zavot or Büyük Zavot) is a village in Kars District, Kars Province, Turkey. Its population is 183 (2022). Its altitude is 2,667 metres (8,750 ft). Its distance to Kars is about 52 kilometres (32 mi).

The village is populated by the Karapapakh.

== See also ==
- Boğatepe Cheese Museum
