= Akyaka, Kars =

Akyaka
- Municipality
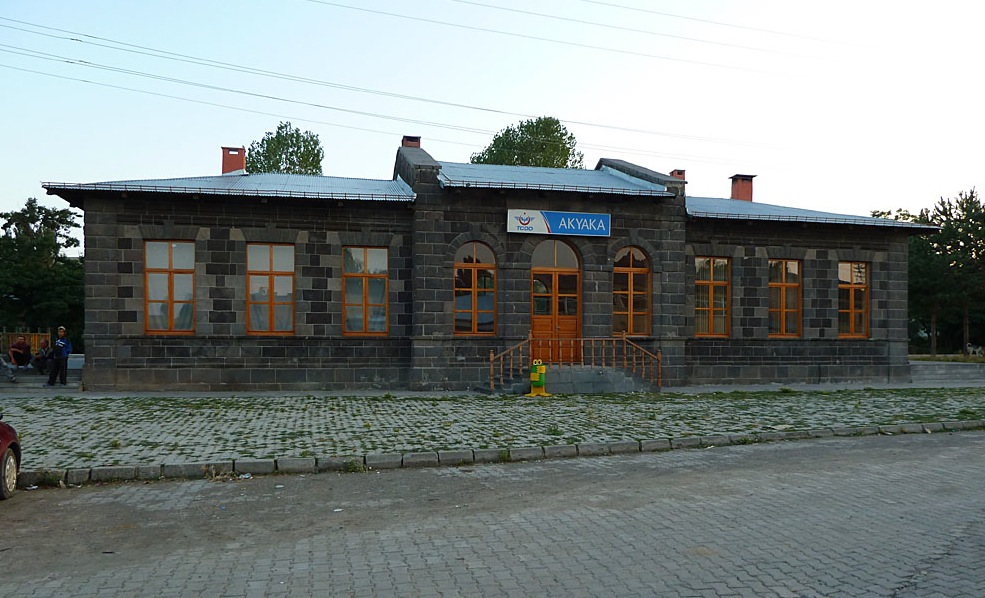
- Akyaka Train Station

- Location within Turkey
- Coordinates: 40°44′40″N 43°37′30″E
- Country: Turkey
- Province: Kars
- District: Akyaka

Government
  - Mayor: Ergüder Toptaş (AKP)
- Population (2022): 2,026
- Time zone: UTC+3 (TRT)
- Postal code: 36780
- Area code: 0474
- Website: www.karsakyaka.bel.tr

Akyaka (Ottoman Turkish: شوره کل, romanized: Şoregil, Şöregel; Azerbaijani: Ağyaxa or Şörəyəl; Armenian: Ղզըլ-Չախչախ, romanized: Ghzyl-Chakhchakh) is a town in Kars Province in eastern Turkey. It is the seat of Akyaka District. Its population is 2,026 (2022). It is located on Turkey's closed border with Armenia.

The town is populated by Azerbaijanis and Karapapakhs.

== Government ==
Ergüder Toptaş was elected mayor in the local elections in March 2019. Nur Seninç Özbek serves as Kaymakam.

== Etymology ==
The settlement was known as Şuregel (Russian: Шурагель) or Kızılçakçak (Russian: Кизил-Чахчах) whilst part of the Russian Empire.

== Transport ==
Akyaka is a border checkpoint on the railway into Armenia, which has been closed since 1993. The route D.060 from Kars runs next to the railway leading to the border.

== Demographics ==
The town—then known as Kızılçakçak—was exclusively Armenian during the Russian Empire whilst it was part of the Kars Okrug of the Kars Oblast. Following the conclusion of the Turkish–Armenian war and Turkey's annexation of the region, Azerbaijanis and Karapapakhs who had fled from Armenia in 1918–1920 settled in Akyaka, replacing the Armenian population which was expelled in 1920.
