= Kağızman =

- Municipality
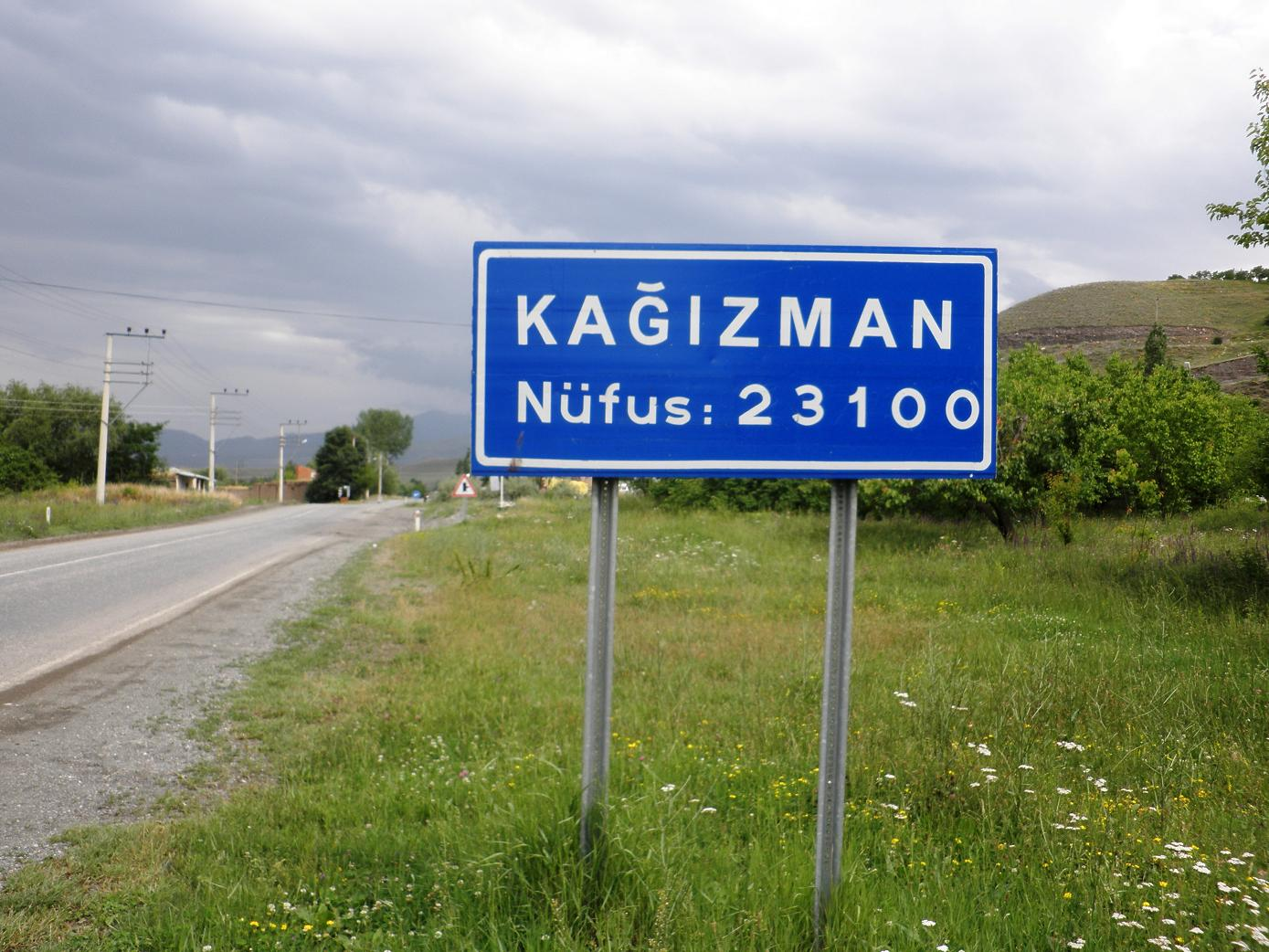

- Location within Turkey
- Coordinates: 40°09′30″N 43°08′03″E
- Country: Turkey
- Province: Kars
- District: Kağızman

Government
  - Mayor: Okan Daştan (State Appointment)
- Population (2022): 21,130
- Time zone: UTC+3 (TRT)
- Postal code: 36700
- Area code: 0474
- Website: www.kagizman.bel.tr

Kağızman (Kurdish: Qaxizman), formerly Kaghzvan (Armenian: Կաղզուան), is a town in Kars Province in the Eastern Anatolia region of Turkey. It is the seat of Kağızman District. Its population is 21,130 (2022).

The current mayor is Okan Daştan (State Appointment). The town was the administrative center of the Kagizman Okrug of the Kars Oblast until 1918.

== Notable people ==
- Rohat Alakom, writer
- Bob Dylan, song writer's paternal grandmother's town
