= Kars Province =

Province of Turkey

Coordinates: 40°27′17″N 43°03′37″E

Kars Province Kars ili
- Province
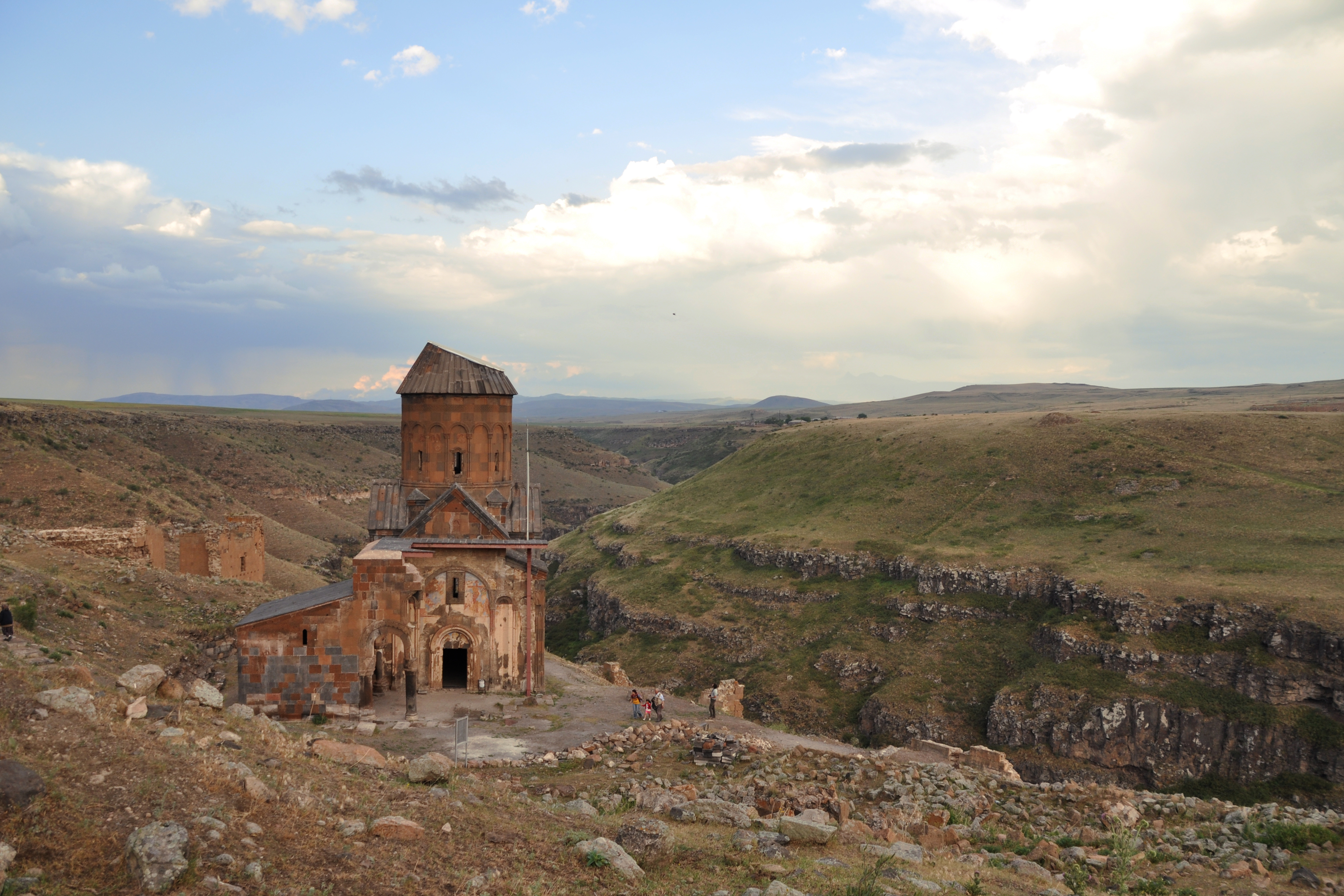
- Church of Saint Gregory the Illuminator in Ani

- Location of the province within Turkey
- Country: Turkey
- Seat: Kars

Government
  - Governor: Hacı Bekir Toprak
- Area: 10,193 km^{2} (3,936 sq mi)
- Population (2022): 274,829
  - Density: 26.963/km^{2} (69.833/sq mi)
- Time zone: UTC+3 (TRT)
- Area code: 0474
- Website: www.kars.gov.tr

Kars Province (Turkish: Kars ili; Azerbaijani: Qars Rayonu; Kurdish: Parêzgeha Qersê; Armenian: Կարսի նահանգ) is a province of Turkey, located in the northeastern part of the country. It shares part of its closed border with Armenia. Its area is 10,193 km^{2}, and its population is 274,829 (2022). The provincial capital is the city of Kars. The provinces of Ardahan and Iğdır were part of Kars Province until 1992.

== History ==
In ancient times, Kars (Armenian: Կարս) was part of the province of Ararat in the Kingdom of Armenia. The first known people were the followers of Vanand (Վանանդ), for whom Kars was their main settlement and fortress. In 928, Kars became the capital of Bagratid Armenia. In 968, the capital of Armenia was moved to Ani, but Kars remained the capital of the feudal principality of Vanand.

The Seljuks quickly relinquished direct control over Kars and it became a small emirate whose territory corresponded closely to that of Vanand, and which bordered the similarly created but larger Shaddadid emirate centered at Ani. The Kars emirate was a vassal of the Saltukids in Erzurum, whose forces were effective in opposing Georgian attempts at seizing Kars. Later on, in 1207, Georgian and Armenian forces commanded by David Soslan and brothers Ivane and Zakare Zakarian-Mkhargrzeli captured Kars after a long siege. It was a part of Zakarid Armenia, principality under rule of Zakarians–Mkhargrdzeli, vassals of Bagrationi dynasty of Georgia. George IV son of Tamar, was appointed as a viceroy of Kars. It was conquered in 1242 by the Mongols; was regained by Georgian Kingdom during the reign of George V the Brilliant (1314–1346) and remained as part of the Kingdom before its disintegration, which then passed into the hands of Georgian Atabegs belonging to the House of Jaqeli. During the rule of the Persian Empire and the Ottoman Empire, the fortress of Kars, located in what was then the eastern part of the city, fell into disrepair. However, as Kars was within a border region its defensive structures were often renewed, and they continued to advance to such a degree, that in the 19th century Kars was well known around the world as a castle.

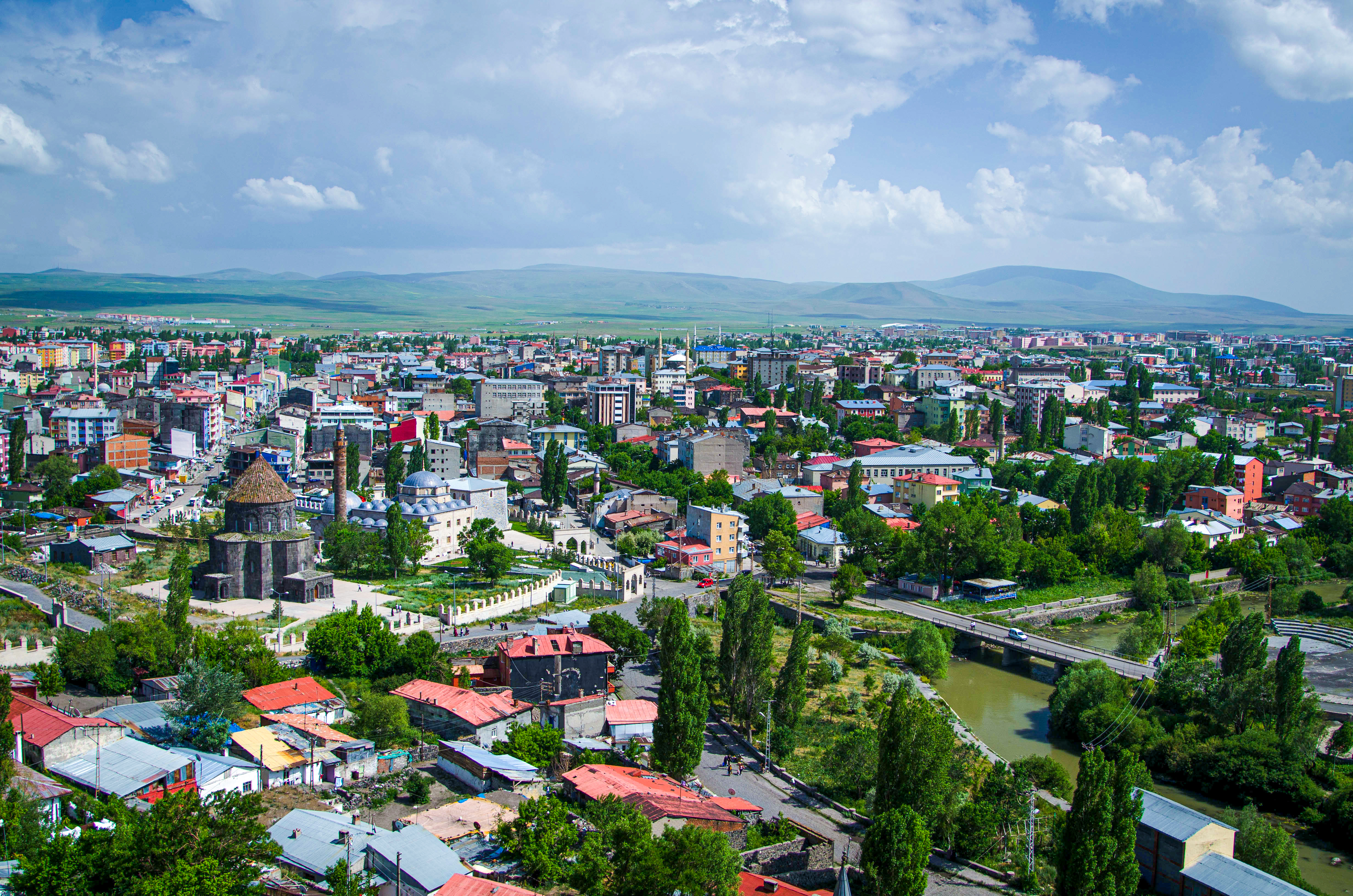
Kars city center

As a result of the Russo-Turkish War of 1877 to 1878, the province of Kars was incorporated into the Russian Empire as part of the militarily administered Kars Oblast and remained so until 1918. It was seen as a border province of a Russian Empire which was seeking to expand yet further by the conquest of more territory belonging to the Ottoman Empire. The period from 1878 to 1918 was marked in the province of Kars by the settlement by the Russian authorities of a very heterogeneous mix of Christian populations, including Armenians, Caucasus Greeks, Russians, Georgians, and even smaller numbers from other Christian communities hitherto with little or no historical links to the region, such as ethnic Germans, Poles, Estonians, Lithuanians, and Russian sectarian communities such as Molokans and Doukhobors. Many from the non-Russian Christian Orthodox communities (Georgians, Caucasus Greeks, and the minority of Armenians who were Lessor Orthodox) had themselves fought in or collaborated with the Russian Imperial army to capture Kars province from the Muslim Ottomans. They saw this as a means of fulfilling their own ambitions to recapture Christian territory on the back of the Russian imperial enterprise.

=== As a part of Turkey ===
In September 1935 the third Inspectorate General (Umumi Müfettişlik, UM) was created. The Inspectorates Generals regions ruled with wide-ranging authority over the population in order to Turkify its population. The third UM span over the provinces of Erzurum, Artvin, Rize, Trabzon, Kars Gümüşhane, Erzincan and Ağrı. It was governed by an Inspector General seated in the city of Erzurum. The Inspectorate General was dissolved in 1952 during the Government of the Democrat Party.

== Geology and geomorphology ==
=== Lakes ===
The main lakes in Kars are Lake Aygır, Lake Çıldır and Lake Kuyucuk.

=== Mountains ===
The main mountains in Kars are the Allahuekber Mountains, Mount Soğanlı and Aras Mountains.

== Demographics ==
Nationality	1874^{1}		1897^{2}		1916		1927^{3}		1950^{4}		1965		2017
Nationality	Number	%	Number	%	Number	%	Number	%	Number	%	Number	%	%
Turkic peoples	22,758	61.8%	103,457	35.6%	102,748	28.21	160,576	78.2%	311,400	75.9%	471,287	77.7%	66.8%
Kurds^{6}	6,404	17.4%	42,968	14.8%	67,450	18.52	42,945	21%	94,847	23.1%	134,136	22.1%	33.2%
Armenians	5,014	13.6%	73,406	25.3%	118,217	32.46	21	0%	23	0%	5	0%	—N/a
Greeks	681	1.8%	32,593	11.2%	16,787	4.61	0	0%	13	0%	6	0%	—N/a
Slavs	—N/a	—N/a	31,099	10.7%	18,997	5.22	—N/a	—N/a	565	0.1%	75	0%	—N/a
Others	1,965	5.3%	7,131	2.5%	40,015	10.99	1,688	0.8%	3,388	0.8%	804	0.1%	—N/a
^{1} Kars Eyalet salname,^{2} Russian Empire Census results in Kars Oblast, ^{3} First Turkish census concerning mother tongue in Kars Province (including Ardahan Province),^{4} Includes Ardahan Province^{6} Includes Zazas and Yezidis.

== Districts ==
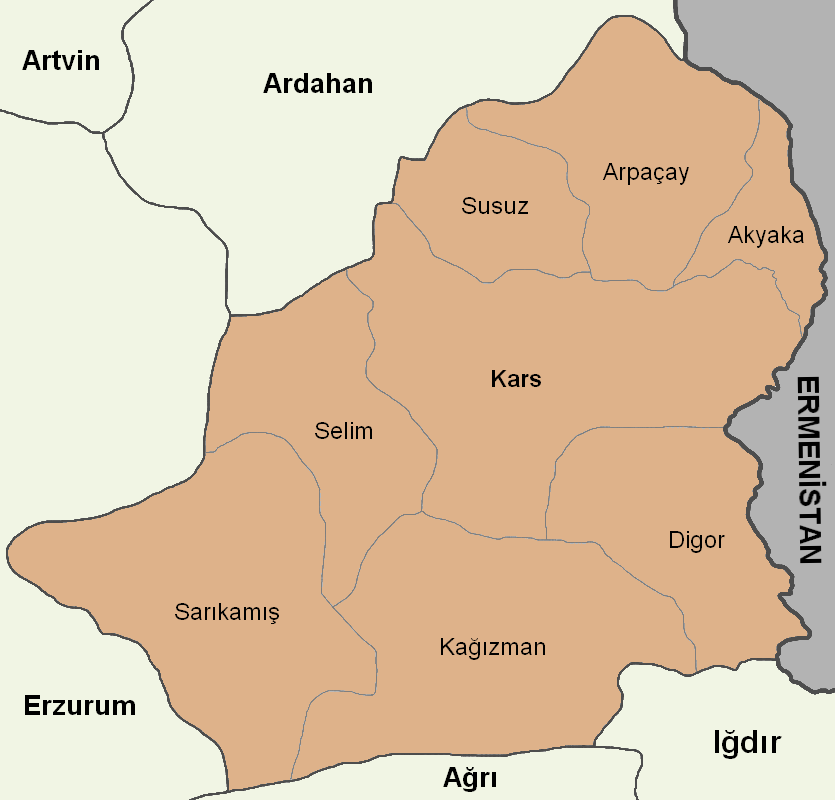

Kars province is divided into 8 districts (ilçe), each named after the administrative center of the district:

- Akyaka
- Arpaçay
- Digor
- Kağızman
- Kars
- Sarıkamış
- Selim
- Susuz

There are 382 villages in Kars Province.

== Kars nature, wildlife and ecotourism ==
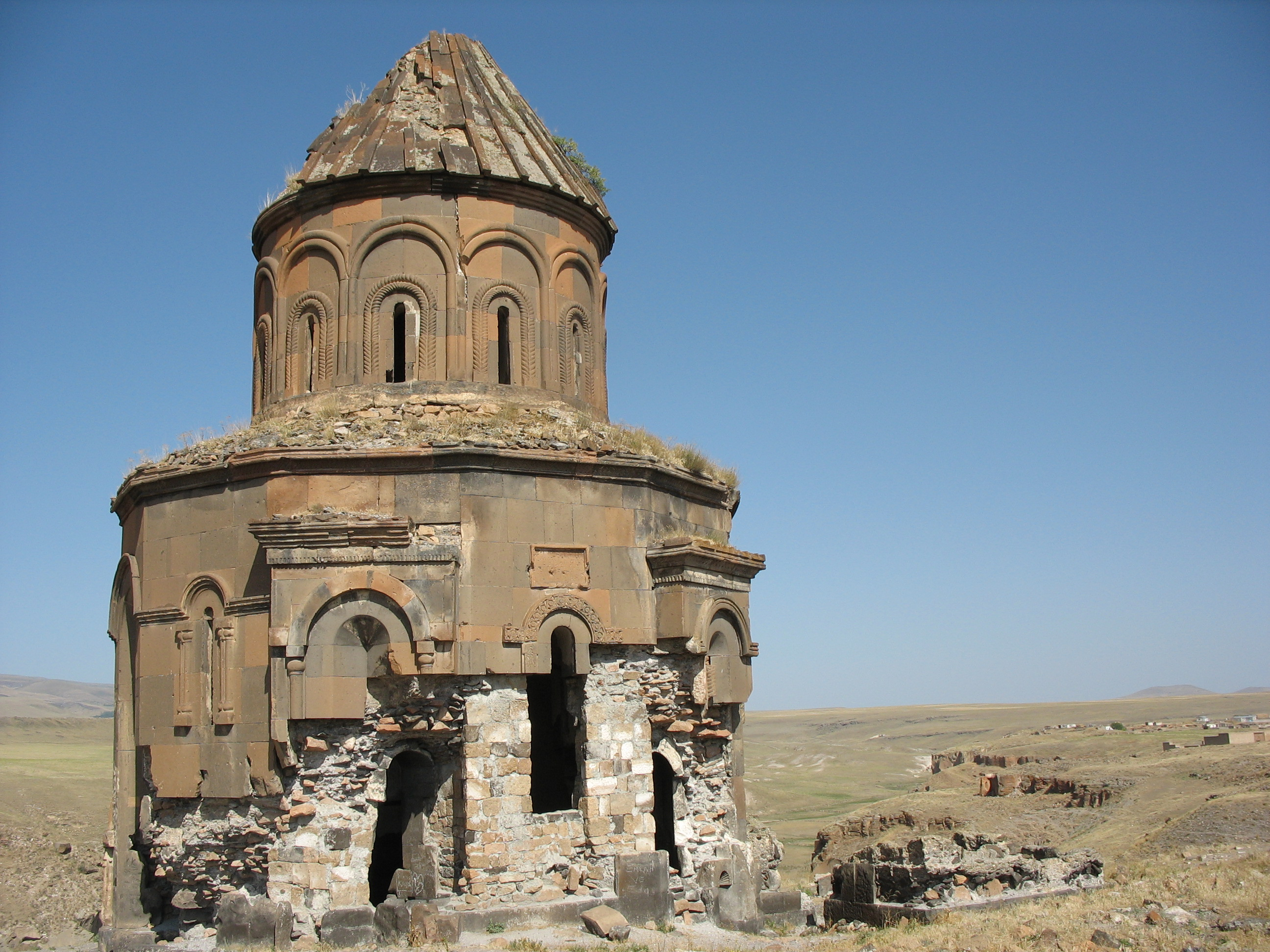
The church of St. Gregory of the Abughamrents in Ani

Kars has a wealth of wildlife that is being documented by the Kars-Iğdır Biodiversity Project run by the KuzeyDoğa Society. The project has recorded 356 of Turkey's 486 bird species in the region, including Ardahan and Iğdır provinces that were formerly part of Kars. At least 233 of these occur at Lake Kuyucuk, that is the most important wetland in the region. Sarıkamış Forests in the south harbor Indian wolves, Syrian brown bear, Caucasian lynx and other animals, and Aras (Araxes) River wetlands comprise a key stop-over site for many migrating birds. Aras River Bird Research and Education Center at Yukarı Cıyrıklı village has recorded 303 bird species at this single location alone.

== Economy ==
The economy of Kars Province is dominated by agriculture, livestock breeding and forestry. 85% of the active population in Kars Province are farmers or herders. 60% of the gross domestic income is received from those sectors. Industry, tourism and commerce is developing.

The climate limits the cultivation of plants in the region. In Kağızman and Tuzluca, cotton, sugar beet, beans and vetches are grown. Vegetable gardening and orchards are not very developed. Wheat, barley, cotton and in small quantity tobacco are grown in the province.

Livestock breeding in the region is more important than agriculture. Grassland, meadows and the rich vegetation led to the development of livestock breeding. The grassland and meadows, which make out 70% of the area of Kars Province, are capable of providing at least ten times of the current livestock potential's breeding. Kars is the biggest cattle breeding province in Turkey, and is the center of livestock trade. Efforts are being made to increase goose breeding, which is very special to Kars region. Aside its meat taking a special place in the Kars cuisine, goose liver and down feather started already to be exported to Europe.

Kars Province is not abundant with woods although the region is favorable for forests. Only 4% of the province area is covered with woods. Scots Pine, spruce and alder are the tree species most found in the woods of Kars. Around 15,000 m^{3} (530,000 cu ft) timber is produced by logging in forestry.

Ore beds of rock salt, arsenic, asbestos, magnesite, gypsum and perlite are explored, however, only rock salt is mined.

Main industrial plants in Kars are of meat processing, livestock feed processing, gristmill, yarn, tannery, footwear, cement and brick factories.

== Cuisine ==
Among the most famous food products special to Kars region are Kars honey, Kars Kasseri, Kars Gruyère cheese, which tastes like Swiss Emmental cheese, and Kars style roasted goose.

== Monuments ==
Kars contains numerous monuments, the most notable being the ruined Armenian city of Ani and the 9th century Church of the Apostles.

== In popular culture ==
Kars was the setting for the popular novel Snow by Orhan Pamuk.

The Siege of Kars, 1855 is a book published by The Stationery Office, 2000, and is an account of its defence and capitulation as reported by one General Williams, one of many British officers lent to the Turkish army to lead garrisons and train regiments in the war against Russia.

In the book, Life and Times of Alexis Zorbas by Nikos Kazantzakis, Zorbas talks about his visit to the Kars province in order to find work and where he also attended an extravagant wedding in Kars.

== Gallery ==
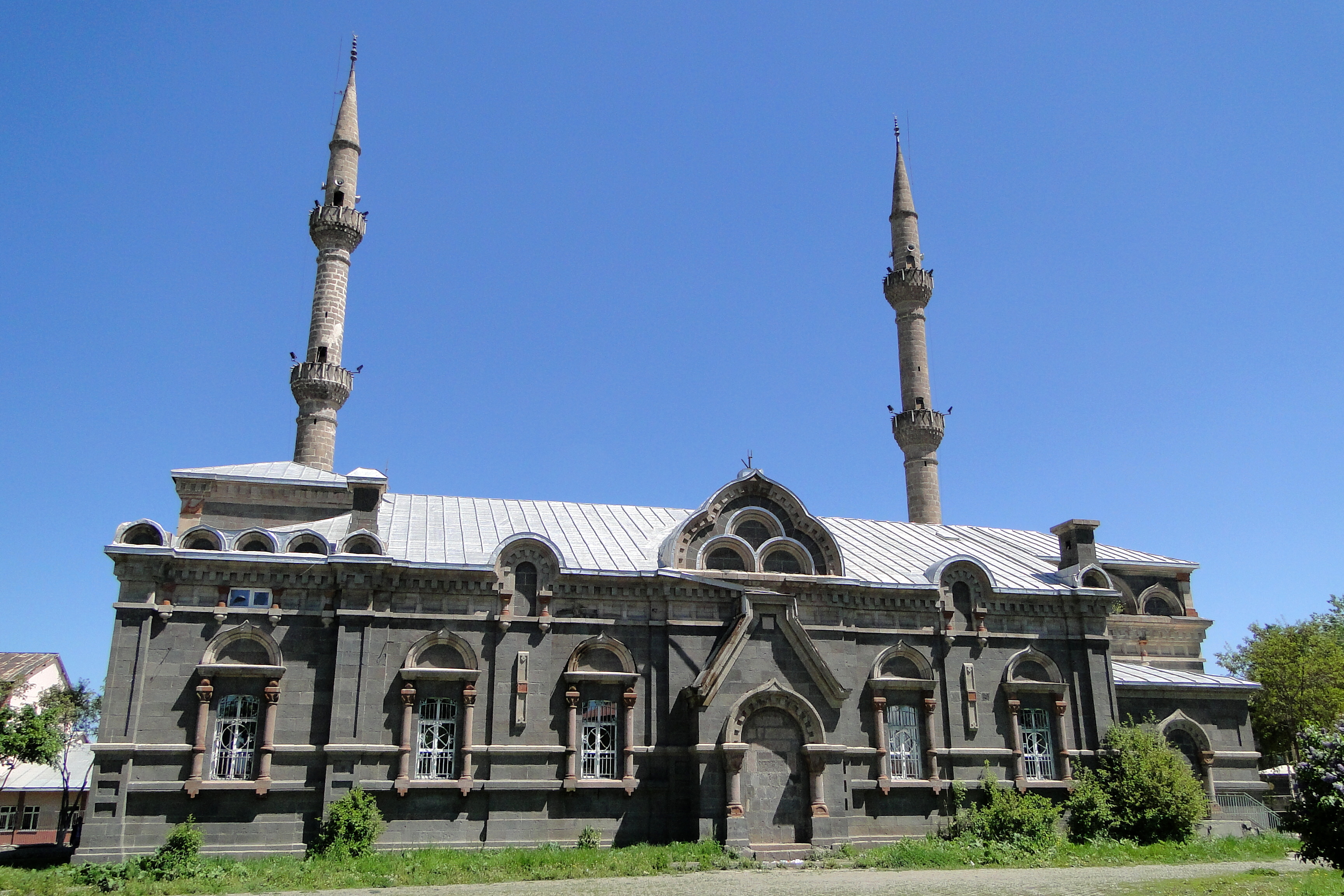
The Fethiye Mosque, formerly the Russian Orthodox Church of Alexander Nevsky Cathedral, in Kars city center

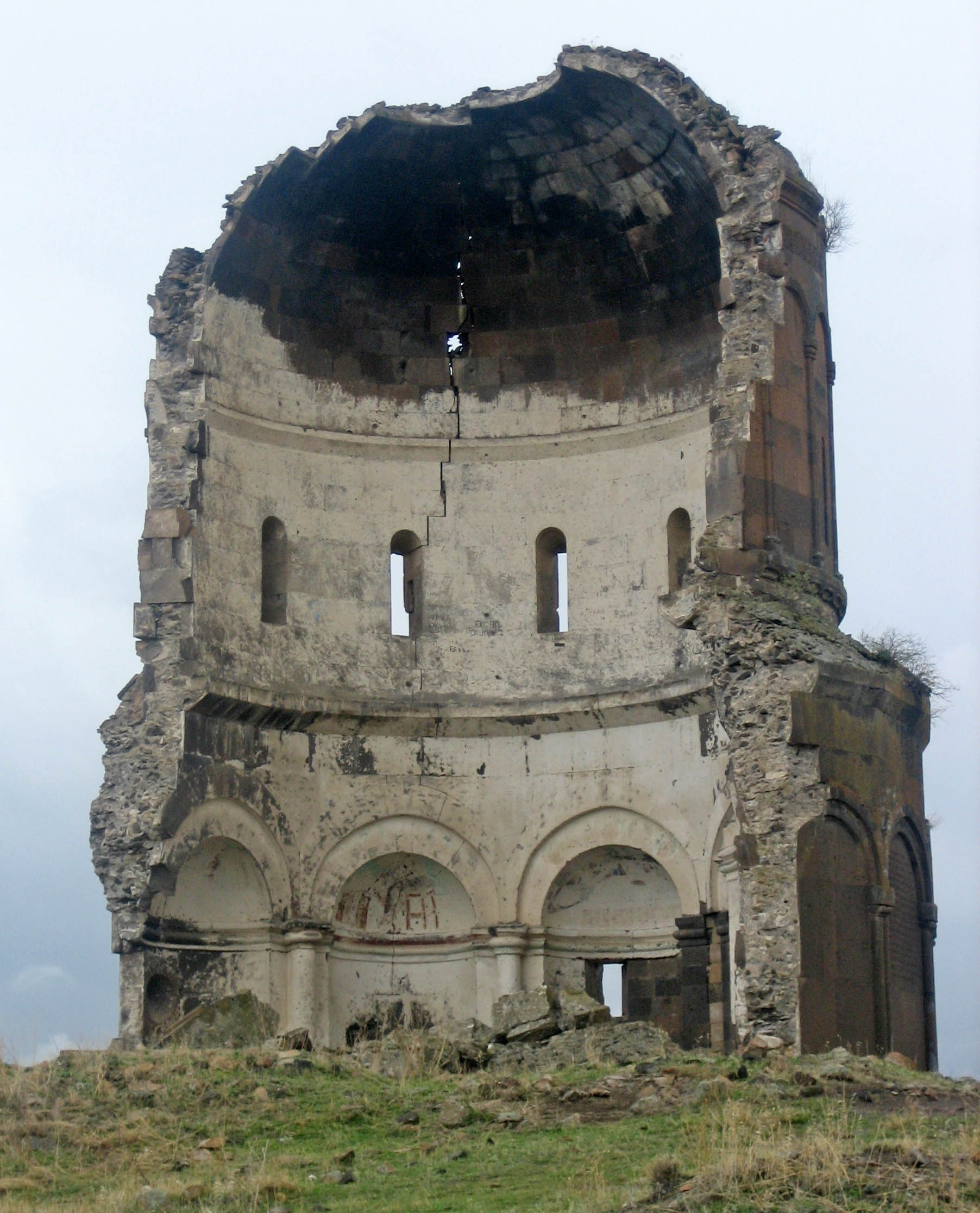
Ruins of Ani

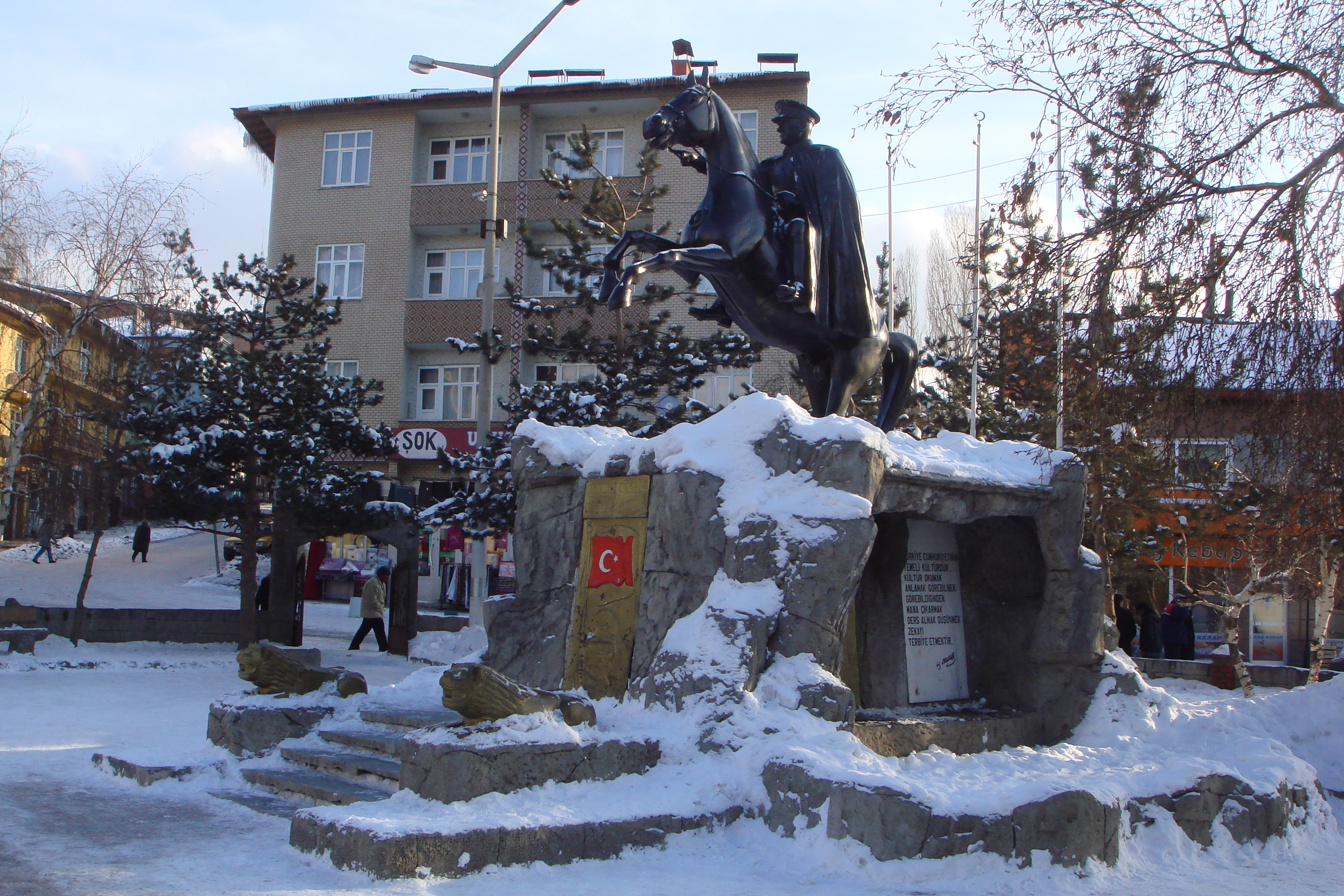
Atatürk monument in Sarıkamış

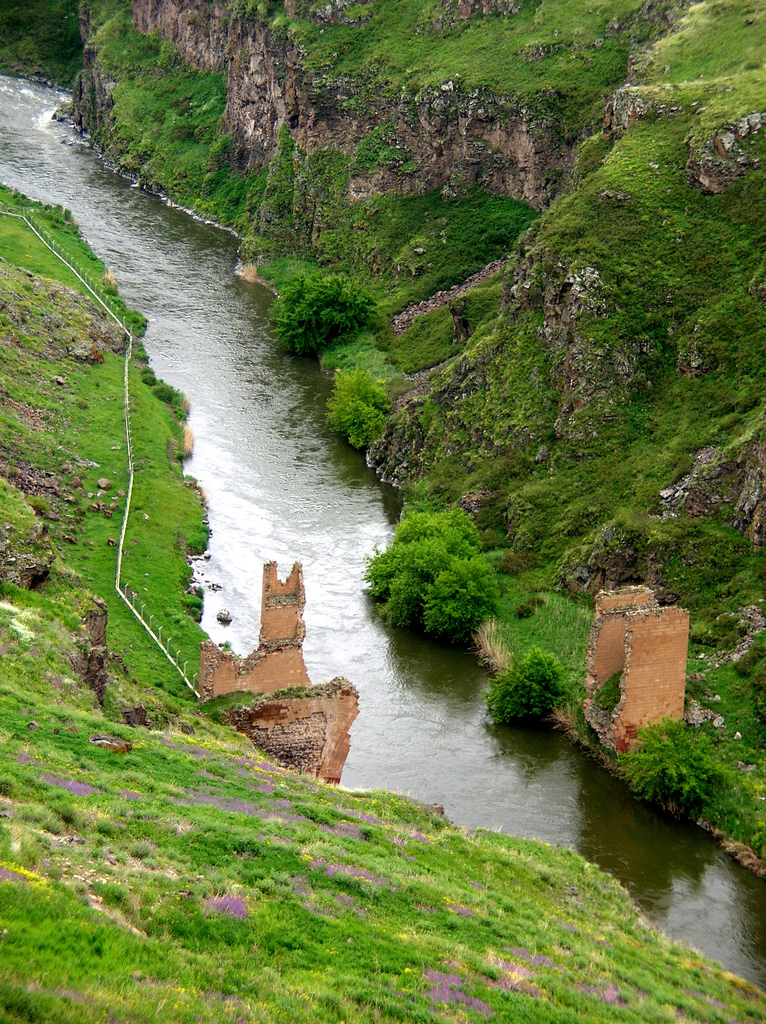
A ruined bridge in Ani

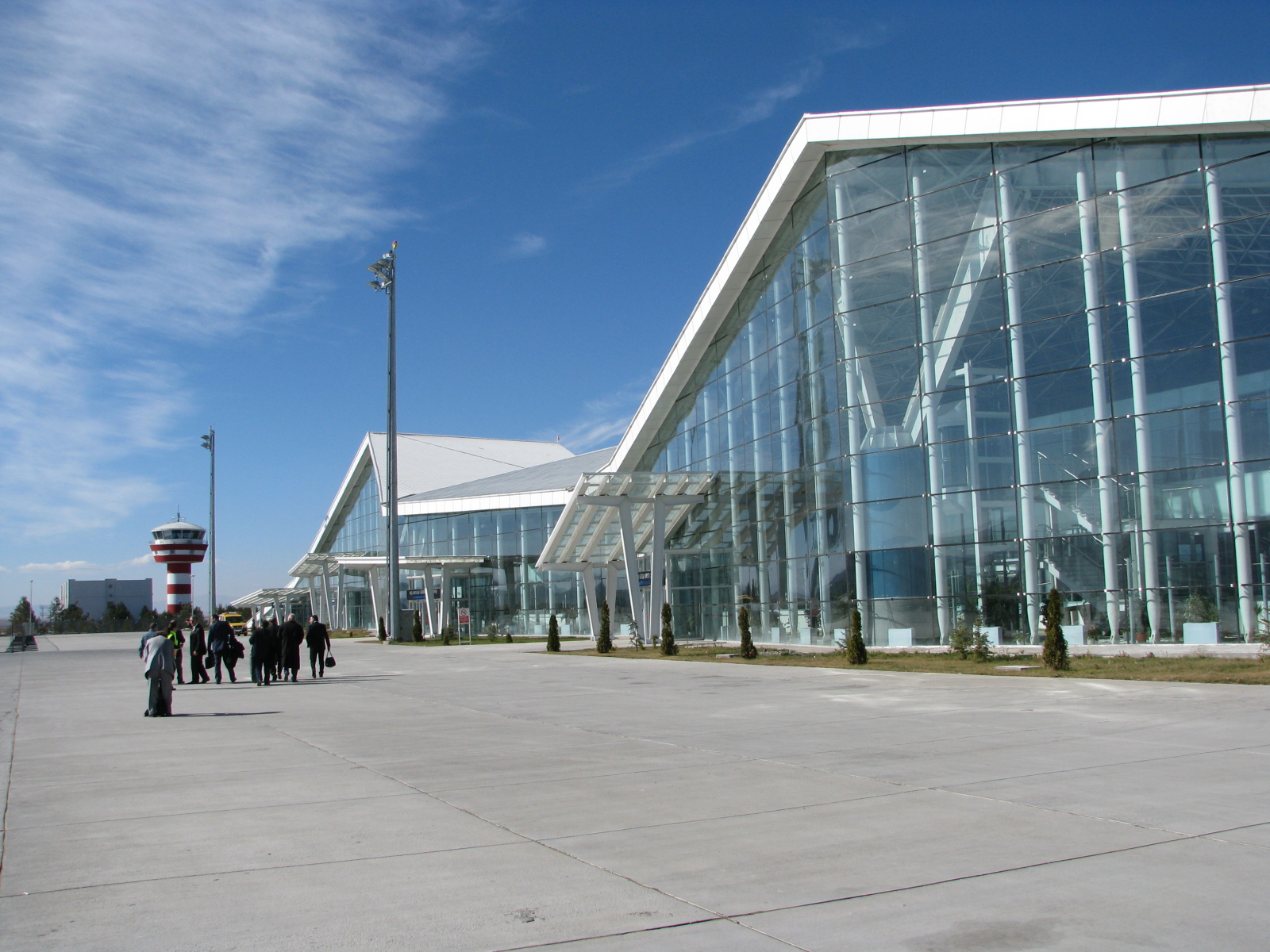
Kars Airport

== See also ==
- List of populated places in Kars Province
