= Patriarchal Exarchate of Africa =

Exarchate of the Moscow Patriarchate in Africa

- Патриарший экзархат Африки
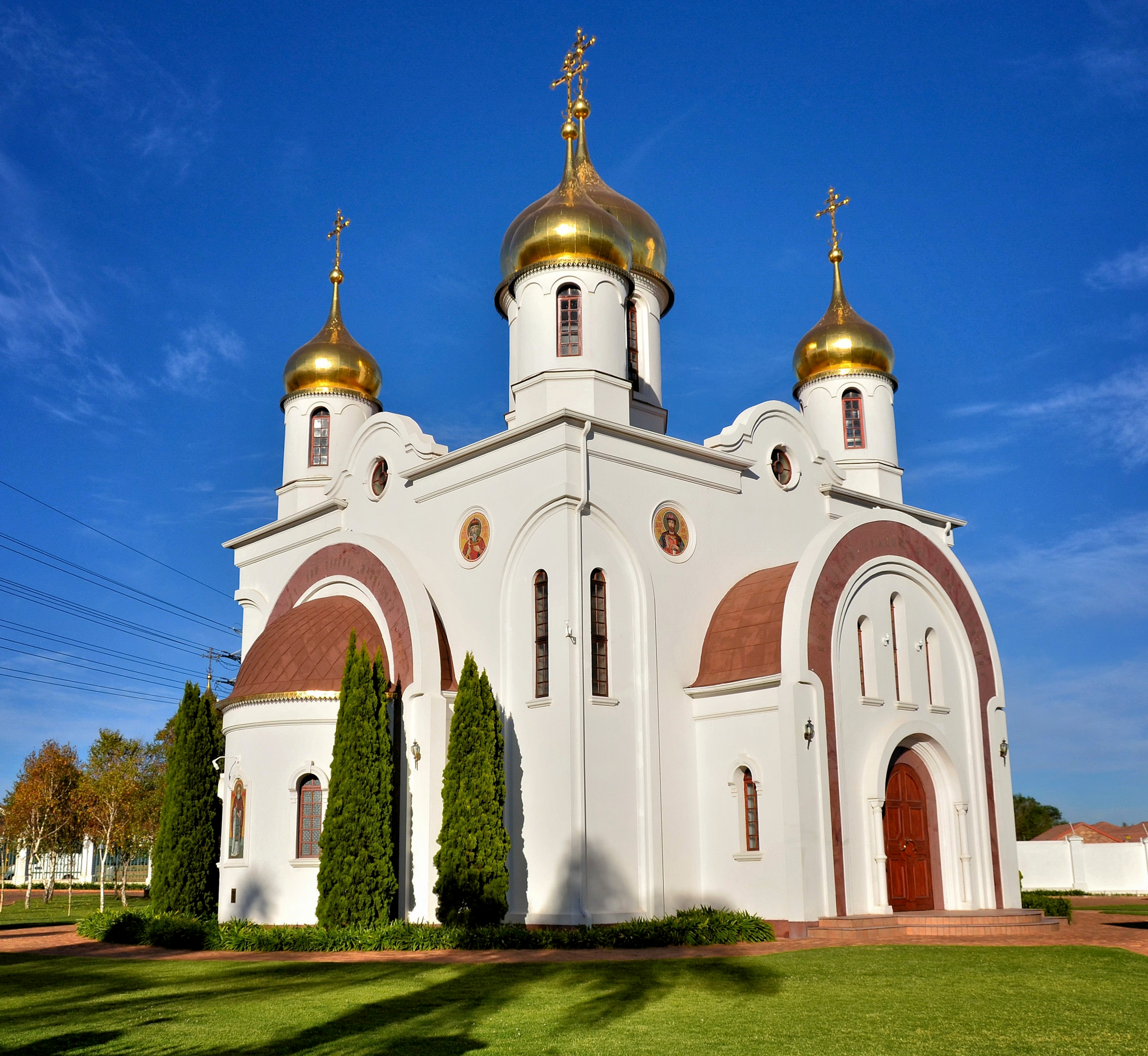
- Saint Sergius of Radonezh Church in Midrand, Johannesburg, South Africa
- Orientation: Russian Orthodoxy
- Theology: Eastern Orthodox
- Polity: Episcopal
- Structure: 2 dioceses (formally)
- Metropolitan: Constantine (Ostrovsky) (since October 11, 2023)
- Calendar: Julian, Revised Julian (temporarily)
- Full communion: Russian Orthodox Church
- Region: 30,370,000 km2
- Language: English, French, Church Slavonic, local languages (first of all: Swahili, Afrikaans, Malagasy, Tiv, Kirundi, Kinyarwanda, Kikuyu, Tiriki, Lingala)
- Liturgy: Byzantine
- Headquarters: Cairo, Egypt (de jure); Moscow, Russia (de facto)
- Territory: Africa
- Founder: Holy Synod of the Russian Orthodox Church
- Origin: December 29, 2021; Moscow
- Recognition: condemned by Greek Orthodox Patriarchate of Alexandria and Ecumenical Patriarchate of Constantinople
- Seminaries: no; students are sent to study in Russia
- Official website: https://exarchate-africa.ru

The Patriarchal Exarchate of Africa (Russian: Патриарший экзархат Африки, French: Exarchat patriarcal d'Afrique) is the exarchate of the Russian Orthodox Church in Africa. It was formed by the decision of the Holy Synod of the Russian Orthodox Church on December 29, 2021.

The exarchate was formed on the territory of the recognized jurisdiction of the Greek Orthodox Patriarchate of Alexandria after the recognition by the Patriarchate of Alexandria of the autocephaly of the Orthodox Church of Ukraine.

As of February 2025, according to official data, the Exarchate has about 350 parishes in 34 countries of the African continent, with resident priests in 24 countries. There are 259 priests and 7 deacons in the clergy of the Exarchate. There are 3 monastic communities.

== History ==
Until 2019, the Russian Orthodox Church recognized the African continent as the exclusive canonical territory of the Greek Orthodox Patriarchate of Alexandria, and also, according to Archpriest Nikolai Balashov, "many times over the years, various schismatics from Africa have applied to the DECR for admission, but we have never entered into any kind of contact with them, not only in concelebration, but also in any way". In addition, according to Metropolitan Anthony (Sevryuk), "the archive of the Department for External Church Relations contains many appeals from Russian-speaking compatriots who live in other African countries and who asked the Russian Orthodox Church to establish its parishes and send priests to them. We respected the rights of the Patriarchate of Alexandria and therefore could not respond affirmatively to the requests we received."

In response to the recognition of the Orthodox Church of Ukraine and its autocephaly by Patriarch Theodore II of Alexandria on November 8, 2019, the Holy Synod of the Russian Orthodox Church on December 26, 2019 decided, among other things, to withdraw "the parishes of the Russian Orthodox Church located on the African continent" from the jurisdiction of the Patriarchate of Alexandria and to grant them a stauropegial status, the Representation of the Patriarch of Moscow and all Russia under the Patriarch of Alexandria to transform into a parish of the Russian Orthodox Church in Cairo. According to Priest George Maximov, "many African priests and laity of the Church of Alexandria have approached us with the same petitions. Strictly speaking, the emergence of an African Exarchate is something that the Africans themselves have proposed. This idea was born in Africa, in African minds. On what grounds would we refuse them if we have already accepted Russians who live in Africa? We can't just say no based on the color of the skin — that's not an argument.".

In September 2021, a reference to the minute № 61 of the Holy Synod of the Russian Orthodox Church indicated that after the break of communication with the Greek Orthodox Patriarchate of Alexandria,

Numerous petitions for admission to the jurisdiction of the Moscow Patriarchate from the clergy of the Church of Alexandria, who did not agree with the decision of Patriarch Theodore to recognize Ukrainian schismatics and did not want to stay under his omophorion for this reason, began to arrive in the Russian Orthodox Church. The Russian Orthodox Church refrained from responding positively to such petitions in the hope that Patriarch Theodore would change his decision, and the bishops of the Church of Alexandria would not support the legalization of the Ukrainian schism. Unfortunately, this did not happen. On July 28, 2021, the Primate of the Church of Alexandria sent his official representative, Bishop Theodore of Babylon, to an event organized by schismatics in Kiev, who read out a greeting on behalf of the Patriarch of Alexandria. And on August 13, 2021, Patriarch Theodore visited Imbros (Turkey) and during the liturgy, which was led by Patriarch Bartholomew of Constantinople, served with the head of the so-called "Orthodox Church of Ukraine", and then during a separate meeting with him assured him of his strong support. To date, none of the bishops of the Alexandrian Orthodox Church has expressed disagreement with the actions of Patriarch Theodore to support the schism in Ukraine.

As a result, by the decision of the Holy Synod of September 23–24, 2021, Archbishop Leonid (Gorbachov), who formerly occupied post of the Representative of the Patriarch of Moscow and All Russia to the Greek Orthodox Patriarch of Alexandria and all Africa, was instructed to study the received appeals and submit proposals to the Holy Synod of the ROC.

On December 29, 2021, the Synod of the Russian Orthodox Church decided to admit 102 clergy of the Patriarchate of Alexandria from eight African countries to the jurisdiction of the Moscow Patriarchate, and also created the Patriarchal Exarchate of Africa, covering the entire African continent with adjacent islands. The North African and South African dioceses were formed as part of the exarchate. The first included the stauropegion parishes of the Moscow Patriarchate in Egypt, Tunisia and Morocco, the second — the stauropegion parish of the Moscow Patriarchate in South Africa. The diocesan bishop of the North African Diocese was determined to have the title "of Cairo and North Africa", the South African diocese - "of Johannesburg and South Africa". Leonid (Gorbachov) immediately after making the decision told RIA Novosti: "The core of the Exarchate will be forged in Moscow. This is a completely new powerful structure on a continental scale, which requires scrupulous, detailed study and elaboration.". The administrative center of the Exarchate became the patriarchal compound of the Church of All Saints at Kulishki in Moscow (the former metochion of the Patriarchate of Alexandria).

The Synod of the Greek Orthodox Patriarchate of Alexandria, at its meeting on January 12, 2022, adopted a statement condemning the establishment exarchate by the Moscow Patriarchate within the jurisdiction of the Church of Alexandria, describing such an act as "the immoral invasion and incursion of the Russian Church by methods of denying the ecclesiastical way and tradition," as well as an attempt to pervert Orthodox ecclesiology for reasons stemming from ethnophyletism, condemned by the Synod of Constantinople of 1872, while the act of the Moscow Patriarchate shows signs of neocolonialism and claims to global dominance, which contradicts the Orthodox tradition. In a response statement of the Holy Synod of the Russian Orthodox Church dated January 28, 2022, it was stated: "Such difficult decision, taken in the situation when the Patriarch of Alexandria recognized the Ukrainian schismatics, is by no means a sign of claims to the canonical territory of the ancient Church of Alexandria. It pursues one goal only – to give canonical protection to those Orthodox clerics in Africa who do not wish to be involved in the unlawful legitimization of the schism. We call upon His Beatitude Patriarch Theodore II of Alexandria and the archpastors of the Most Holy Church of Alexandria to renounce their support for the Ukrainian schism and return to the canonical path in order to preserve the unity of the Holy Orthodoxy.".

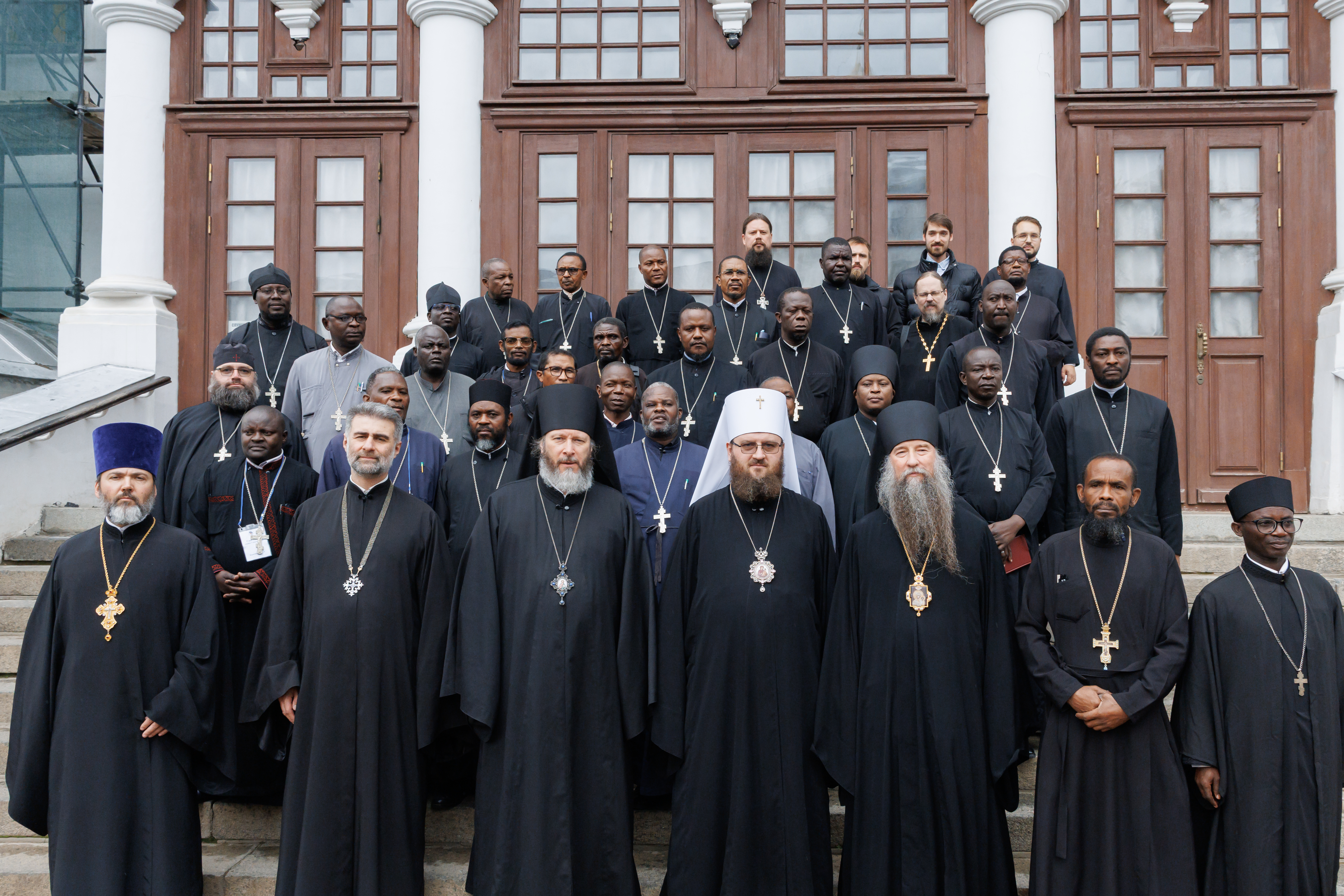
Deans of the Patriarchal Exarchate of Africa in Trinity Sergius Lavra with Metropolitan Constantine (Ostrovsky) of Cairo and bishop Cyril (Zinkovsky) of Sergiyev Posad. August 24, 2025

The Holy Synod of the Russian Orthodox Church at its meeting on March 24, 2022 approved the Internal Regulations on the Patriarchal Exarchate of Africa and its Charter.

In March 2023, Metropolitan Leonid noted: "In our Exarchate there is a professional development program for people who already have a theological education, which they received in Greek schools or Catholic universities. Specialized courses on the main subjects of theological schools are taught for them. We are pioneers in this business, so we carefully and scrupulously try to develop the most comfortable lecture courses and programs for students who come to us in Moscow. The African continent has 1.3 billion people and 54 countries with official sovereign status. There are many different kinds of Christian and pseudo-Christian formations and sects on the territory of these countries, many of which, after the formation of the Patriarchal Exarchate in Africa, began to ask to us."

== Exarchs ==
- Leonid (Gorbachov) (December 29, 2021 — October 11, 2023)
- Constantine (Ostrovsky) (since October 11, 2023)

== Literature ==
- Thiani, Evangelos (2024). "The Russian Orthodox Church in Africa – For Political or Ecclesial Reasons?". Studies in World Christianity. 30 (2). Edinburgh University Press: 249–268. doi:10.3366/swc.2024.0473.
- Kouremenos, Nikos (2024). "The Ukrainian Ecclesiastical Crisis and Its Global Reverberations: The Russian Exarchate in Africa as a Case Study". Studia Universitatis Babes-Bolyai - Theologia Catholica Latina. 69 (2): 46–62.
- Suslov, Mikhail (2024). "The Russian Orthodox Church Turns to the Global South: Recalibration of the Geopolitical Culture of the Church". Religions. 15 (12) 1517. doi:10.3390/rel15121517.
- "Митрополит Зарайский Константин: не стоит недооценивать Африку. Об Африканской миссии Русской Православной Церкви" (PDF). Журнал Московской Патриархии (in Russian) (1): 84–93. 2025.
- Максимов, Юрий (2025). "Первые годы деятельности Патриаршего экзархата Африки Русской Православной Церкви" (PDF). Учёные записки Института Африки РАН (in Russian). 11 (1): 99–125.
- Беляев, Сергей (2025). "Основы регулирования деятельности Русской Православной Церкви в Африке" (PDF). Учёные записки Института Африки РАН (in Russian). 11 (1): 126–145.
