= Church of the Intercession of the Holy Mother of God =

Russian Orthodox church in Armenia

- Սուրբ Տիրամոր Եկեղեցի; Храм Покрова Пресвятой Богородицы
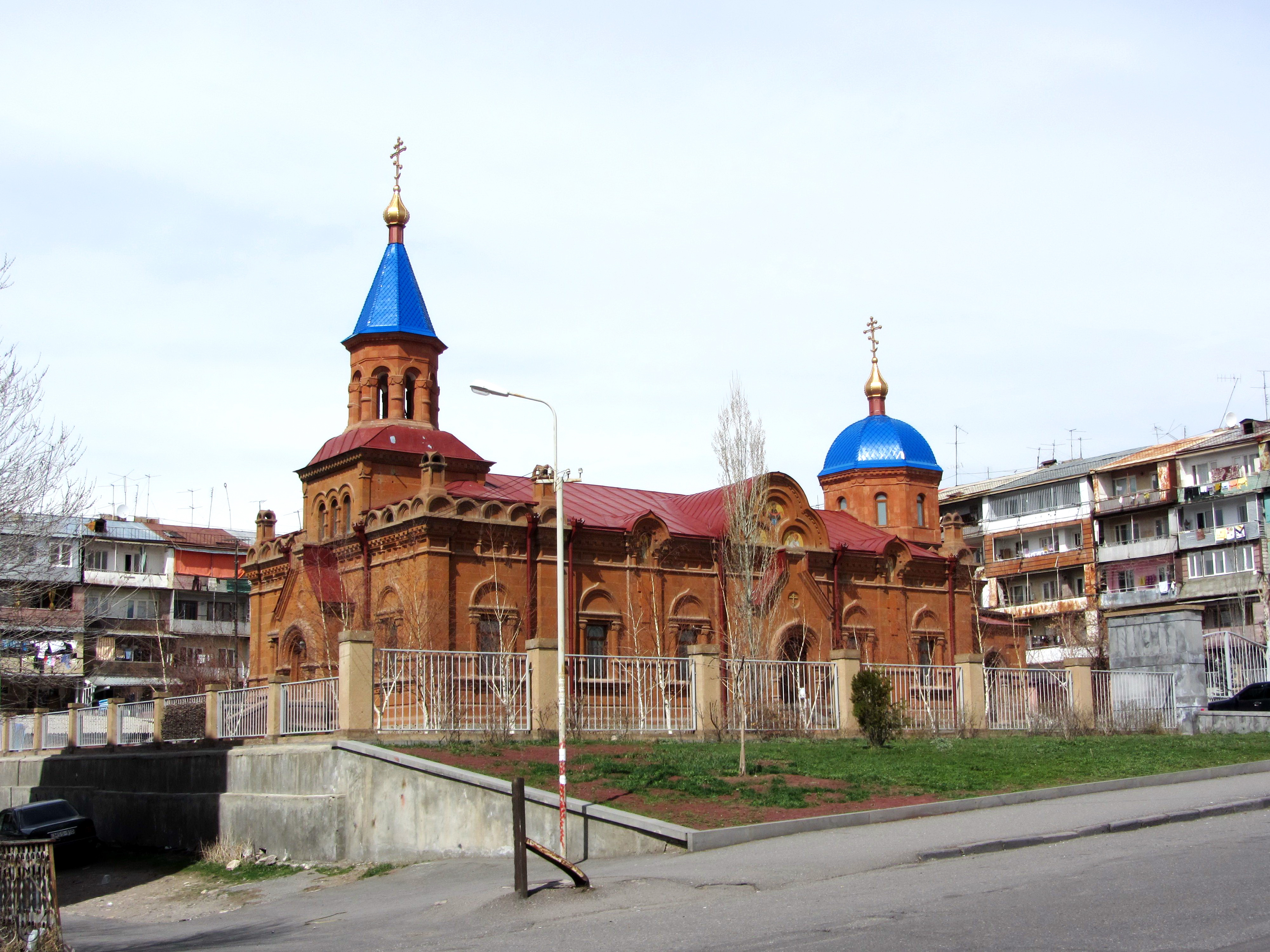
- Church of the Intercession of the Holy Mother of God, Kanaker, Yerevan

- Location within Armenia

Religion
- Affiliation: Russian Orthodox Church
- District: Kanaker-Zeytun
- Region: Yerevan
- Ecclesiastical or organisational status: active
- Year consecrated: 1912

Location
- Location: Zakaria Kanakertsi street, Yerevan, Armenia
- Coordinates: 40.2241°N 44.5454°E

Architecture
- Architect: Fyodor Verzhbitsky
- Style: Russian
- Groundbreaking: 1913
- Completed: 1916

Specifications
- Dome: 2
- Materials: stone

The Church of the Intercession of the Holy Mother of God of Kanaker (Armenian: Քանաքեռի Սուրբ Տիրամոր Ռուս Ուղղափառ Եկեղեցի (Kanakeri Surb Tiramor Rus Ughghap'ar Yekeghets'i), Russian: Храм Покрова Пресвятой Богородицы в Канакер), is an active Russian Orthodox church in the old area of Kanaker, Yerevan, Armenia. Main church of the Diocese of Yerevan and Armenia.

== History ==
The church was built in the village of Kanaker—since absorbed by Yerevan—7 kilometres north of the capital's old centre in 1912. Being part of the Yerevan Governorate of the Russian Empire, the church was built to serve the 2nd Caucasian division of the Russian troops deployed near Yerevan, which consisted mainly of Cossacks from Kuban and Poltava. It was designed by the Russian architect Fyodor Verzhbitsky after the fashion typical to military churches. Upon its inauguration, the church was named after Saint Alexander Nevsky.

During the Soviet period, the church was closed and turned into a warehouse, and was reopened with the independence of Armenia in 1991. It was entirely renovated in 2000. The centennial of the church's consecration was commemorated in October 2012, with representatives from the Russian Orthodox Church present.

== Gallery ==
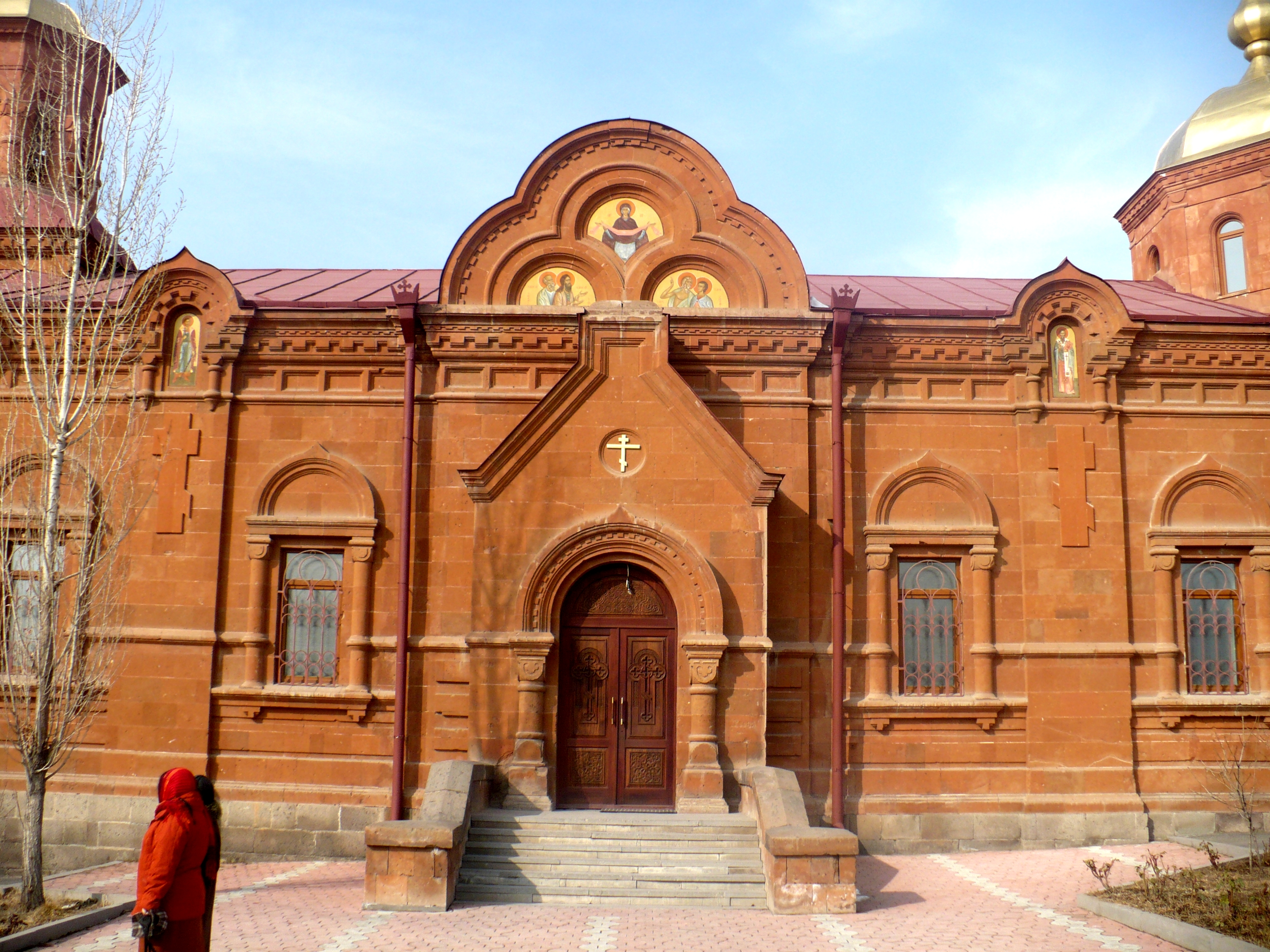
The main entrance

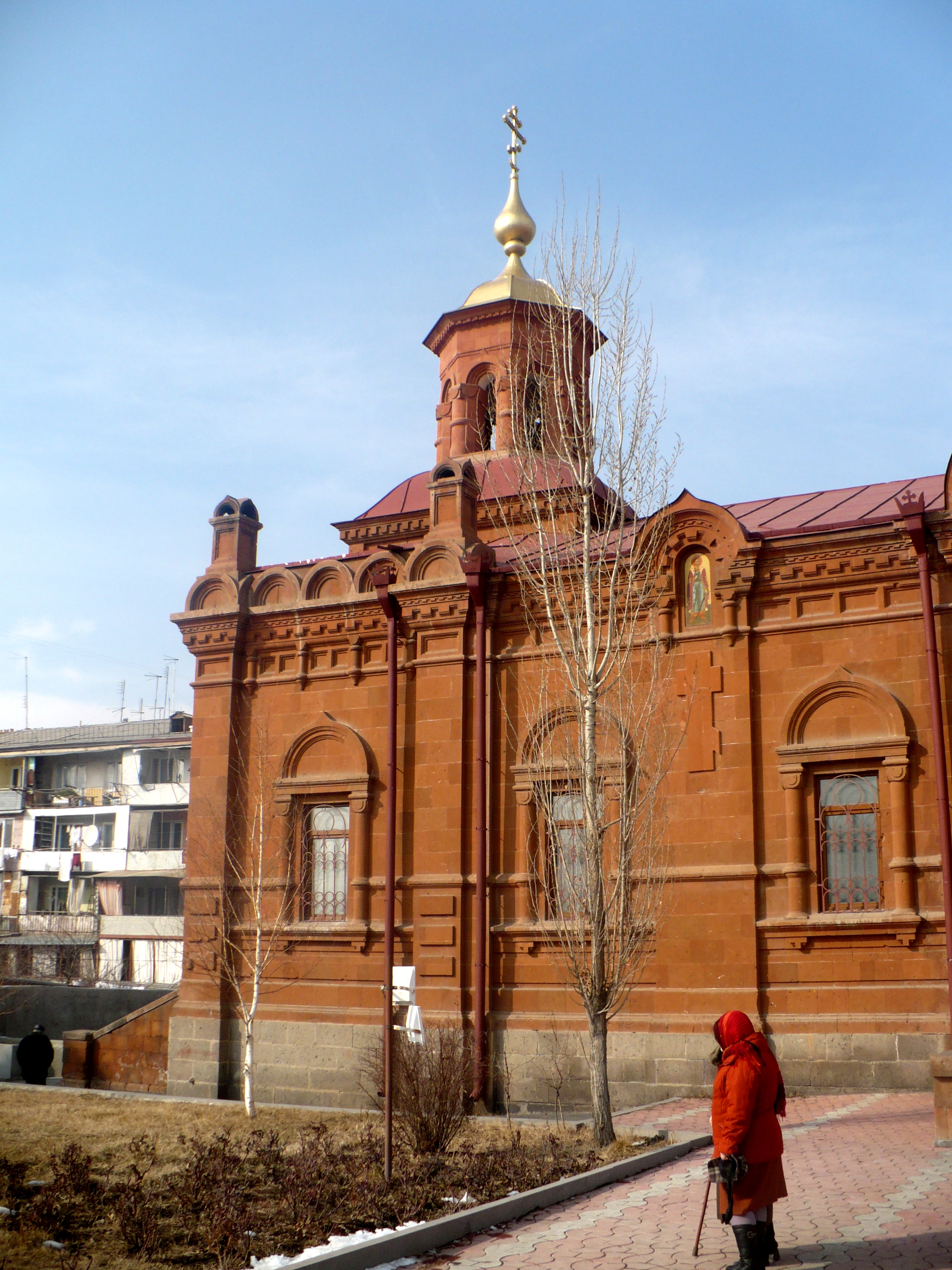
The tower

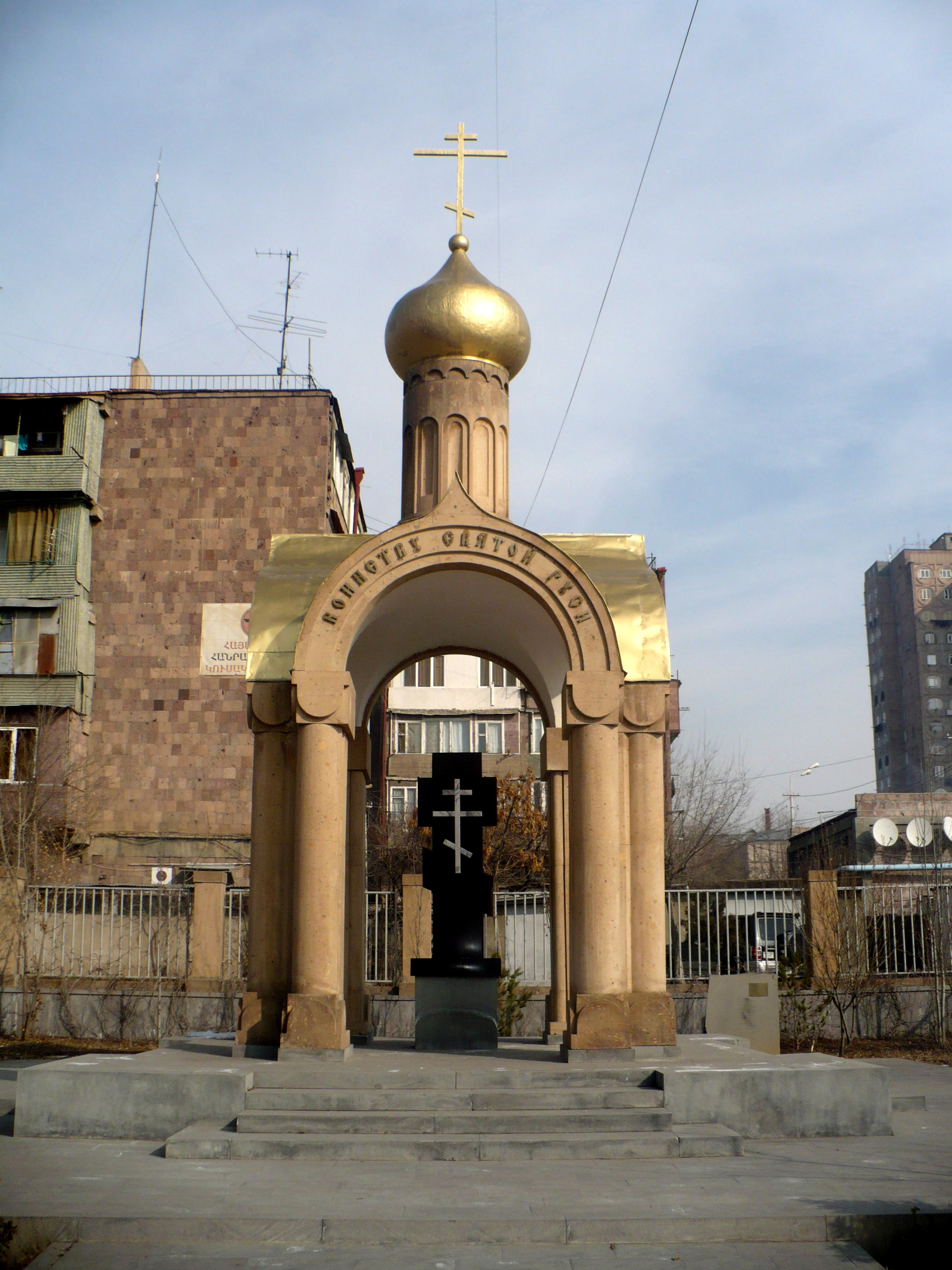
The belfry

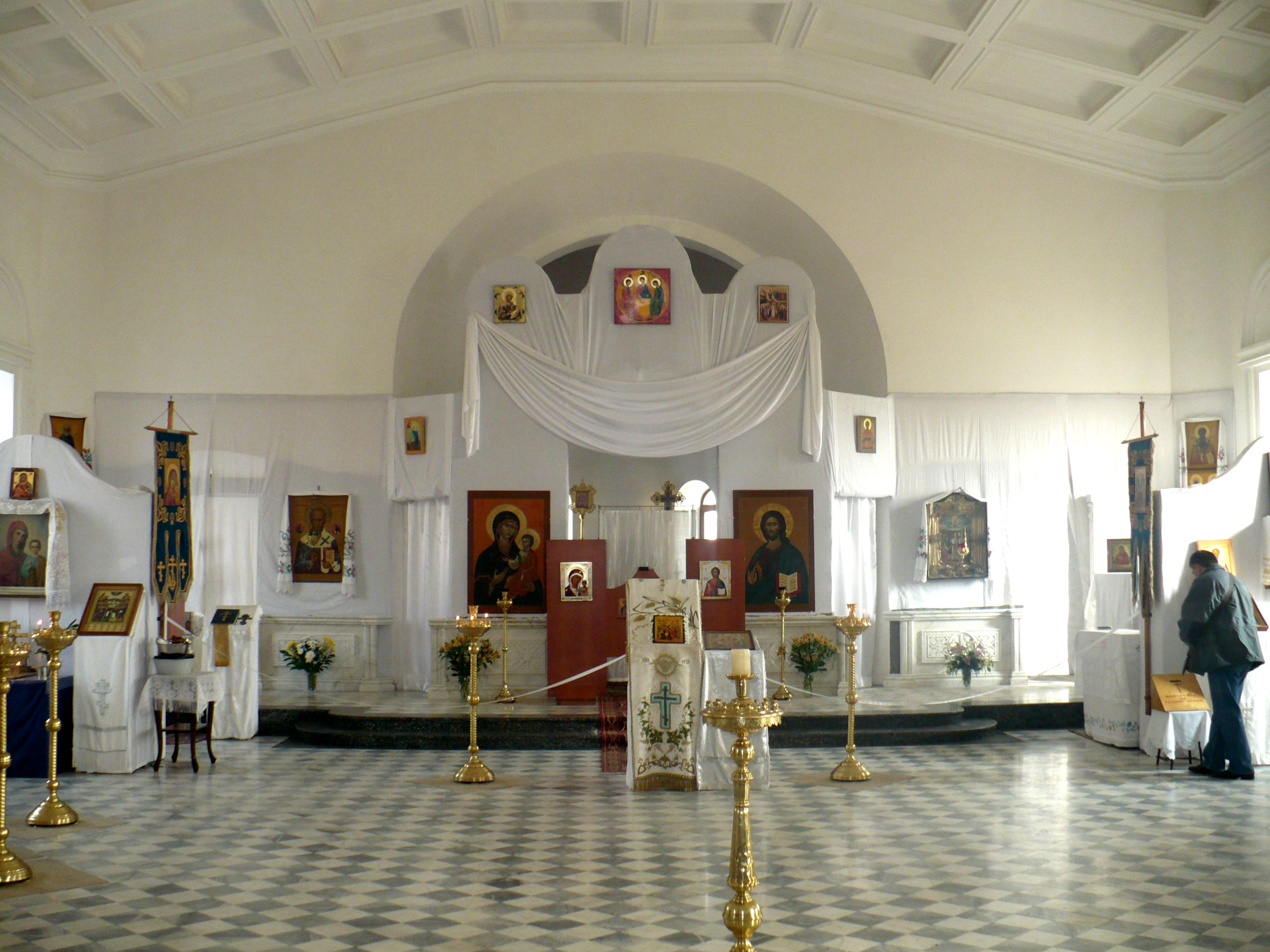
The altar

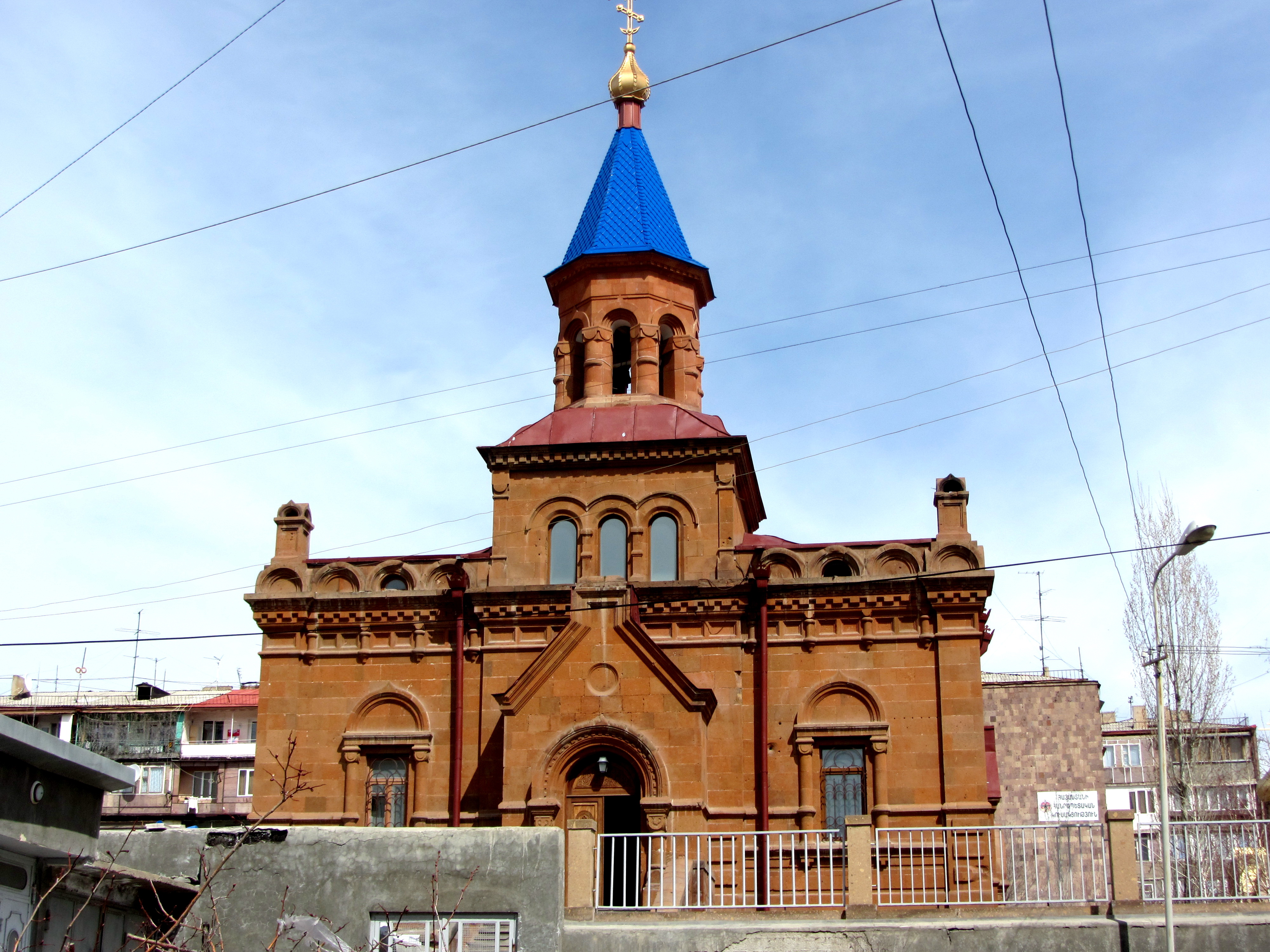
Church of the Intercession of the Holy Mother of God

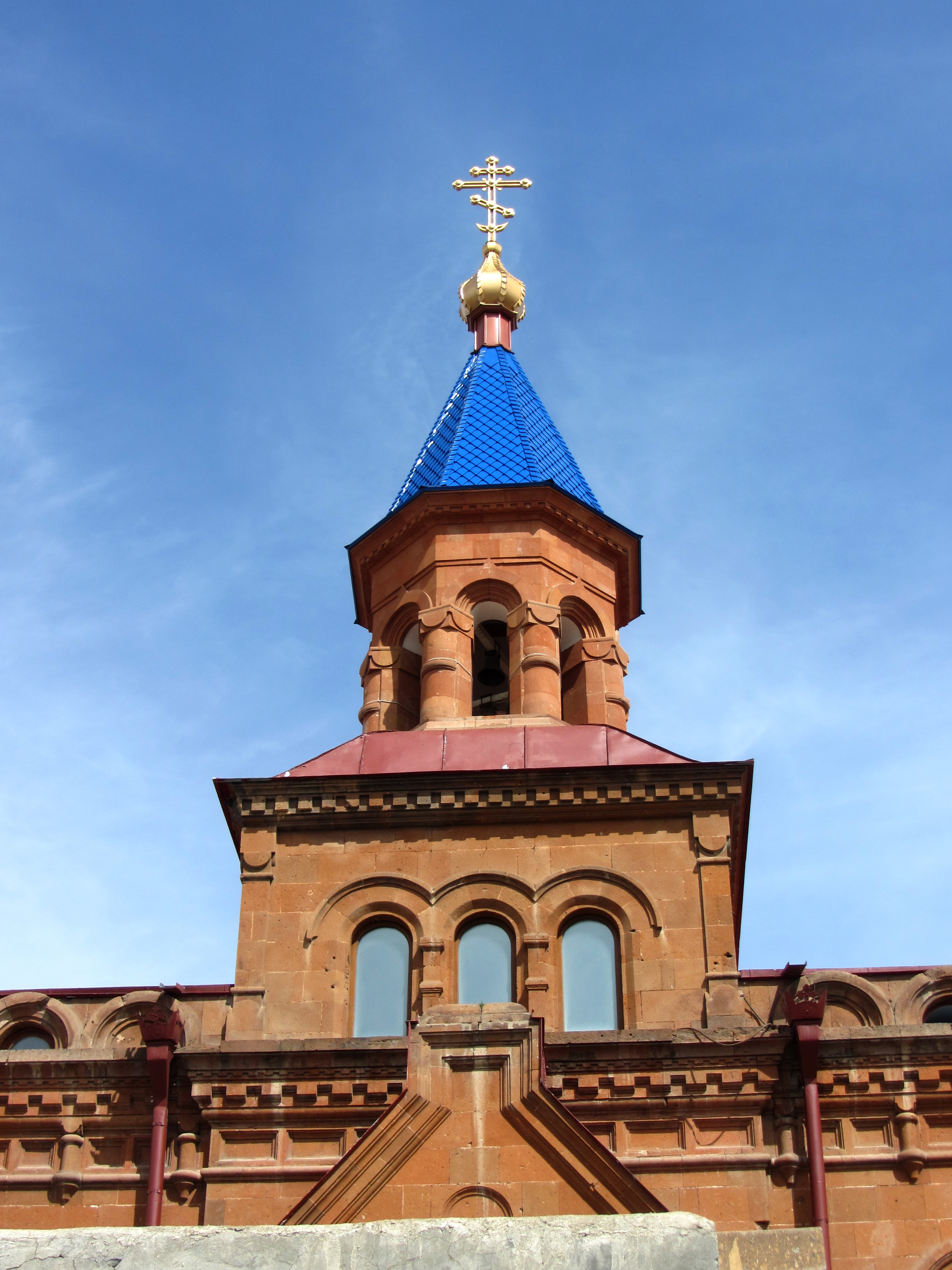
Church of the Intercession of the Holy Mother of God
