= Ahmet Muhtar Gün =

Turkish diplomat

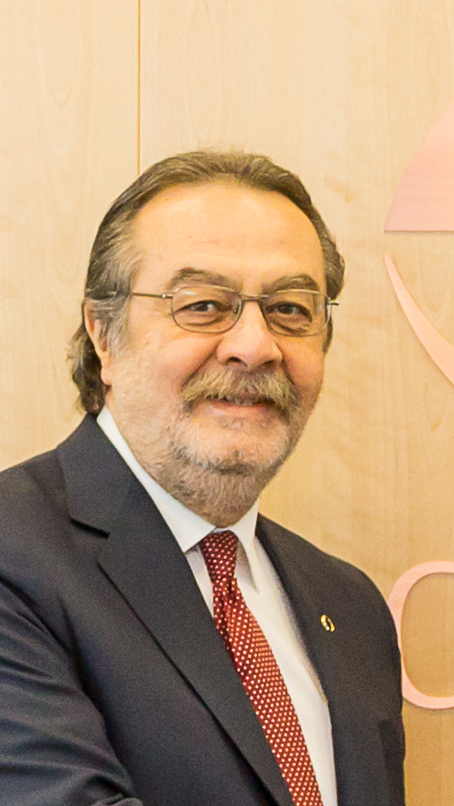
- Gün in February 2018

Turkey's Representative to United Nations in Vienna
- In office 20 February 2018 – 16 July 2022
- President: Recep Tayyip Erdoğan
- Preceded by: Birnur Fertekligil
- Succeeded by: Levent Eler

Personal details
- Born: 4 June 1959 (age 66) Sarıkamış, Turkey

Ahmet Muhtar Gün (born 4 June 1959, Sarıkamış) is a Turkish diplomat and former permanent representative of Turkey to United Nations Vienna Office.

== Education and career ==
Gün graduated from Galatasaray High School and studied international relations at Ankara University. He started his career in Turkish Ministry of Foreign Affairs in 1986 and after various positions he became the ambassador of Turkey to Saudi Arabia in 2010. He also served as the permanent representative of Turkey to United Nations Vienna Office.
