= Erzurum Province, Ottoman Empire =

Erzurum Province, Ottoman Empire may refer to:

- Erzurum Eyalet
- Erzurum Vilayet
