= Church of All Saints at Kulishki, Moscow =

Church in Moscow, Russia

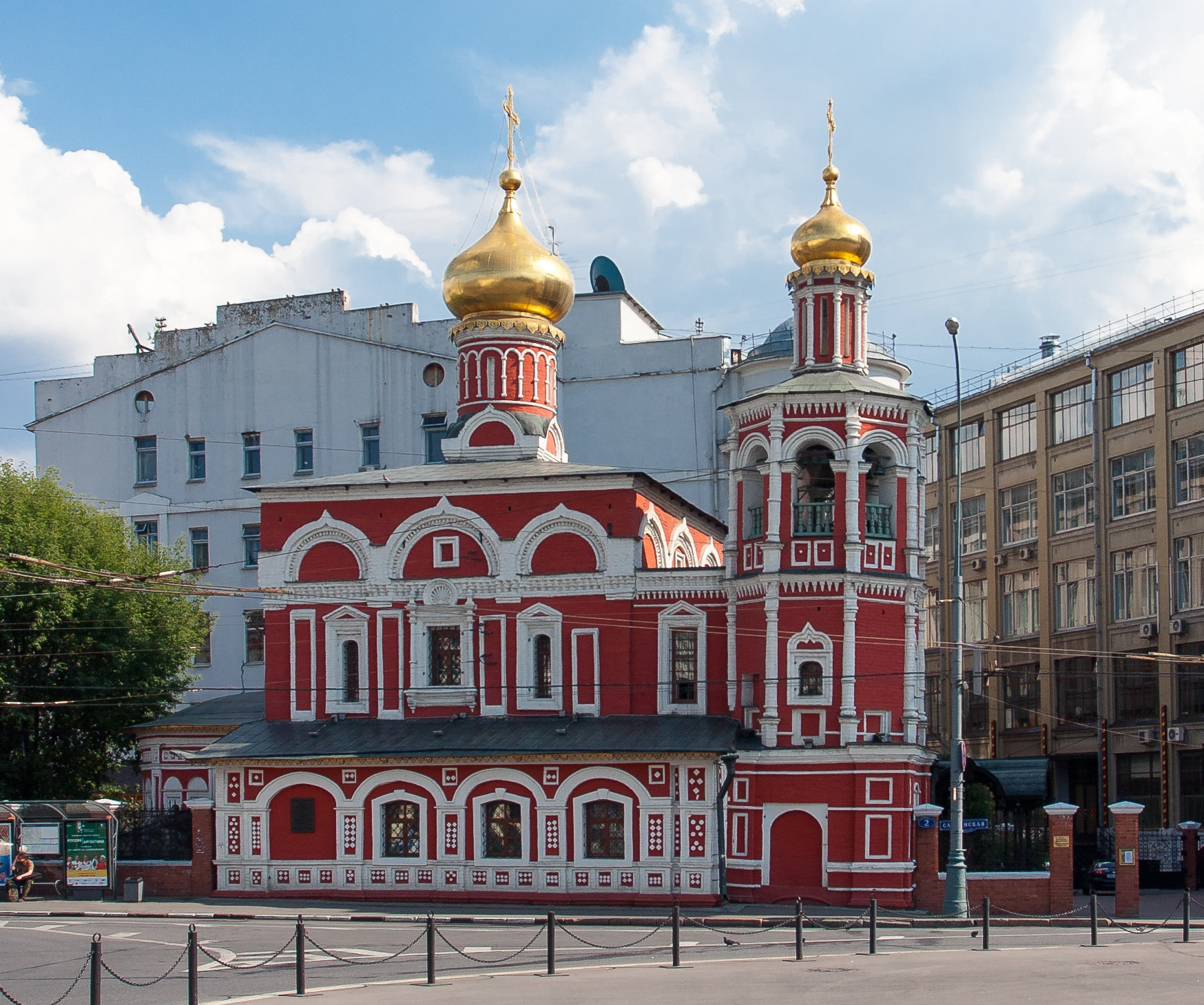
View from the Slavyanskaya Square

Church of All Saints at Kulishki (Russian: Церковь Всех Святых на Кулишках) is one of the oldest churches in Moscow, located at 2 Slavyanskaya Square. A notable feature of the church is its leaning bell-tower.

== History ==
The first wooden church at this place was built by Dmitry Donskoy most likely in 1380 after the Battle of Kulikovo. In the 14th century, the place chosen for the church was far away from the border of Moscow and the word kulichki became a synonym for at the world's end or in the middle of nowhere, but now it is at the historical center of Moscow.

The church was completely rebuilt in stone in 1488 and again in the Muscovite Baroque style in 1687–1689.

After the October Revolution, the church was looted. In 1930, it was closed and used in the 1930s by NKVD as the place of mass executions. In 1975, the building was transferred to the Museum of History of Moscow and in 1991, it was returned the Russian Orthodox Church. In 1994, here was placed the cross in the memory of victims of Soviet repressions.

On March 31, 1999, the metochion of the Eastern Orthodox Church of Alexandria was moved from Odesa to Moscow and was placed in the Church of All Saints. On November 25, 2019, Patriarch Kirill of Moscow and All Russia suspended the work of the Alexandria metochion in Moscow. The reason was the recognition of the Orthodox Church of Ukraine by the Patriarch of Alexandria.

On October 11, 2021, by the decree of Patriarch Kirill, Archbishop Leonid (Gorbachov) of Yerevan and Armenia was appointed rector of the All Saints church on Kulishki in Moscow. On December 30, 2021, Archbishop Leonid (Gorbachov) announced that the church was designated for the administrative needs of the newly formed Patriarchal Exarchate of Africa.
