= Erzurum Province (disambiguation) =

Erzurum Province is a province of Turkey.

Erzurum Province may also refer to the following provinces of the Ottoman Empire:

- Erzurum Eyalet, 1533–1867
- Erzurum vilayet, 1867–1923
