= Constantine Ostrovsky =

Patriarchal Exarch of Africa

His Eminence Metropolitan Constantine
- Митрополит Константин
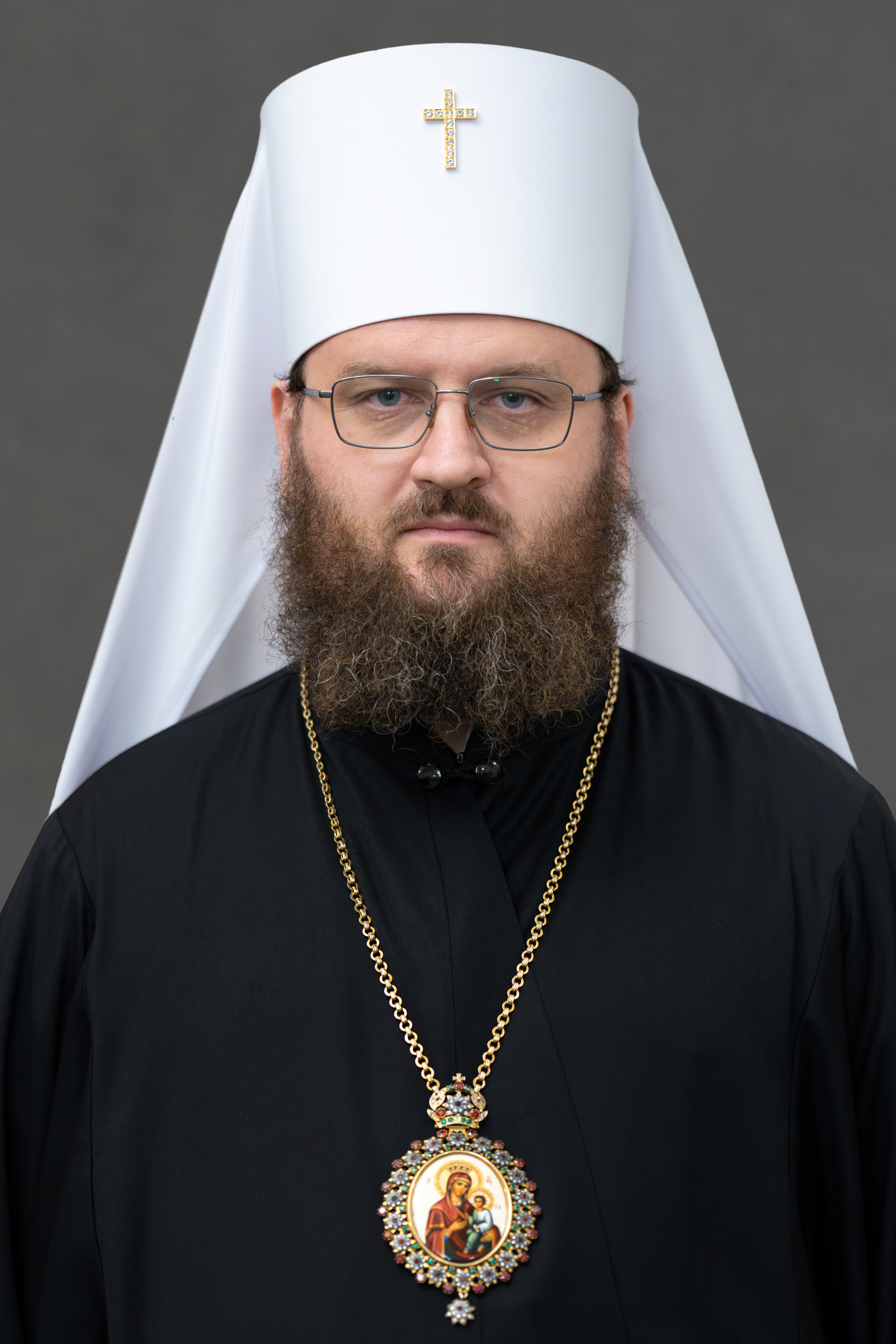
- Title: Metropolitan of Cairo and Northern Africa

Personal life
- Born: Ilya Konstantinovich Ostrovsky; 3 August 1977 (age 48) Moscow
- Home town: Moscow
- Parents: Archpriest Konstantin Ostrovsky (father); Rimma Ostrovskaya (mother)

Religious life
- Religion: Christianity
- Denomination: Eastern Orthodoxy
- Church: Russian Orthodox Church

Metropolitan Constantine (Russian: Митрополит Константин, secular name Ilya Konstantinovich Ostrovsky, Russian: Илья Константинович Островский; born August 3, 1977, Moscow) is a bishop of the Russian Orthodox Church, metropolitan of Cairo and North Africa, Patriarchal Exarch of Africa.

== Biography ==
He was born on August 3, 1977, in Moscow. Father: Archpriest Konstantin Ostrovsky, rector of the Assumption Church in Krasnogorsk, Moscow Oblast; mother: Rimma (baptized Alexandra) Georgievna Ostrovskaya. The eldest of four brothers, two of whom are priests. His younger brother is priest Pavel Ostrovsky, a famous publicist and missionary.

In 1990–1995, he performed various obediences at the Assumption Church in the city of Krasnogorsk. In 1994, he graduated from high school and the children's church music school at the Assumption Church in Krasnogorsk.

In 1995, he entered the Moscow Theological Seminary, from which he graduated in 1999. In 1999, he entered the Moscow Theological Academy, from which he graduated in 2003.

In 1997–2002, he served the subdeacon of Metropolitan Juvenal (Poyarkov) of Krutitsy and Kolomna.

On October 9, 1998, he was ordained a reader by Archbishop Eugene (Reshetnikov) of Vereya, rector of the Moscow Theological Academy and Seminary. On January 6, 2001, he was tonsured a monk by Metropolitan Juvenal (Poyarkov) of Krutitsy and Kolomna with the name Constantine in honor of the New Martyr Konstantin of Bogorodsk. On February 15, 2001, he was ordained deacon, and on December 2, 2002, he was ordained priest with the laying on of a nabedrennik.

In 2002–2012, he was a vice-rector of the Kolomna Theological Seminary for educational work. In 2003–2012, he led the choir of the Kolomna Theological Seminary. Since 2003, he also taught comparative theology in the 4th year. From 2007 to 2012, he taught Church singing in the 2nd year.

In 2003–2006, he served as a member of the Diocesan Council of the Moscow Oblast Diocese. On January 12, 2004, he was included in the Diocesan Liturgical Commission and appointed its secretary. In the same year, he was appointed a cleric of the Church of the introduction of the Virgin into the Temple at the Kolomna Theological Seminary. In 2005, he was appointed Chairman of the Department of Religious Education and Catechesis of the Moscow Oblast Diocese and a member of the Coordinating Council for Cooperation between the Ministry of Education of the Moscow Oblast and the Moscow Oblast Diocese.

On December 11, 2009, he was appointed regent of the clergy choir of the Moscow Oblast diocese, which was created at the same time, which included the clergy of the diocese, students of the Kolomna Theological Seminary and lay people. The choir took an active part in the main events of the church life of the Moscow Oblast Diocese: annually sang at Christmas and Easter divine services in the Assumption Church of the Novodevichy Convent in Moscow, participated in episcopal divine services in the cities of the Moscow Oblast, repeatedly accompanied patriarchal divine services in the Dormition Cathedral of the Moscow Kremlin and in the parishes of the Moscow Oblast Diocese. He managed the choir until the summer of 2012.

On June 14, 2011, he was appointed head of the Missionary and Catechetical Courses of the Moscow Oblast Diocese, which were created at the same time. The objectives of the courses were the training, retraining and advanced training of catechist missionaries, teachers of parochial schools, social and youth workers for parishes and monasteries of the Moscow Oblast Diocese.

On July 26, 2012, by the decision of the Holy Synod of the ROC, he was elected titular Bishop of Zaraisk, vicar of the Moscow Oblast Diocese and appointed rector of the Kolomna Theological Seminary.

On July 29, 2012, in the Cathedral of Our Lady of Smolensk of the Novodevichy Convent Мetropolitan Juvenal of Krutitsy and Kolomna elevated him to the rank of archimandrite.

On July 31, 2012, in the Our Lady of Vladimir chapel at the Patriarchal Residence in Chisty Lane, he was nominated Bishop of Zaraisk, vicar of the Moscow Oblast Diocese. The nomination ceremony was headed by Patriarch Kirill of Moscow.

On August 12, 2012, in the newly consecrated Church of the Three Holy Hierarchs at the Kolomna Theological Seminary, he was consecrated Bishop of Zaraisk, vicar of the Moscow Oblast Diocese. The consecration was performed by: Patriarch Kirill of Moscow and All Russia, Metropolitan Juvenal (Poyarkov) of Krutitsy and Kolomna, Metropolitan Barsanuphius (Sudakov) of Saransk and Mordovia, Archbishop Gregory (Chirkov) of Mozhaisk, Archbishop Eugene (Reshetnikov) of Vereya, Bishop Sergius (Chashin) of Solnechnogorsk.

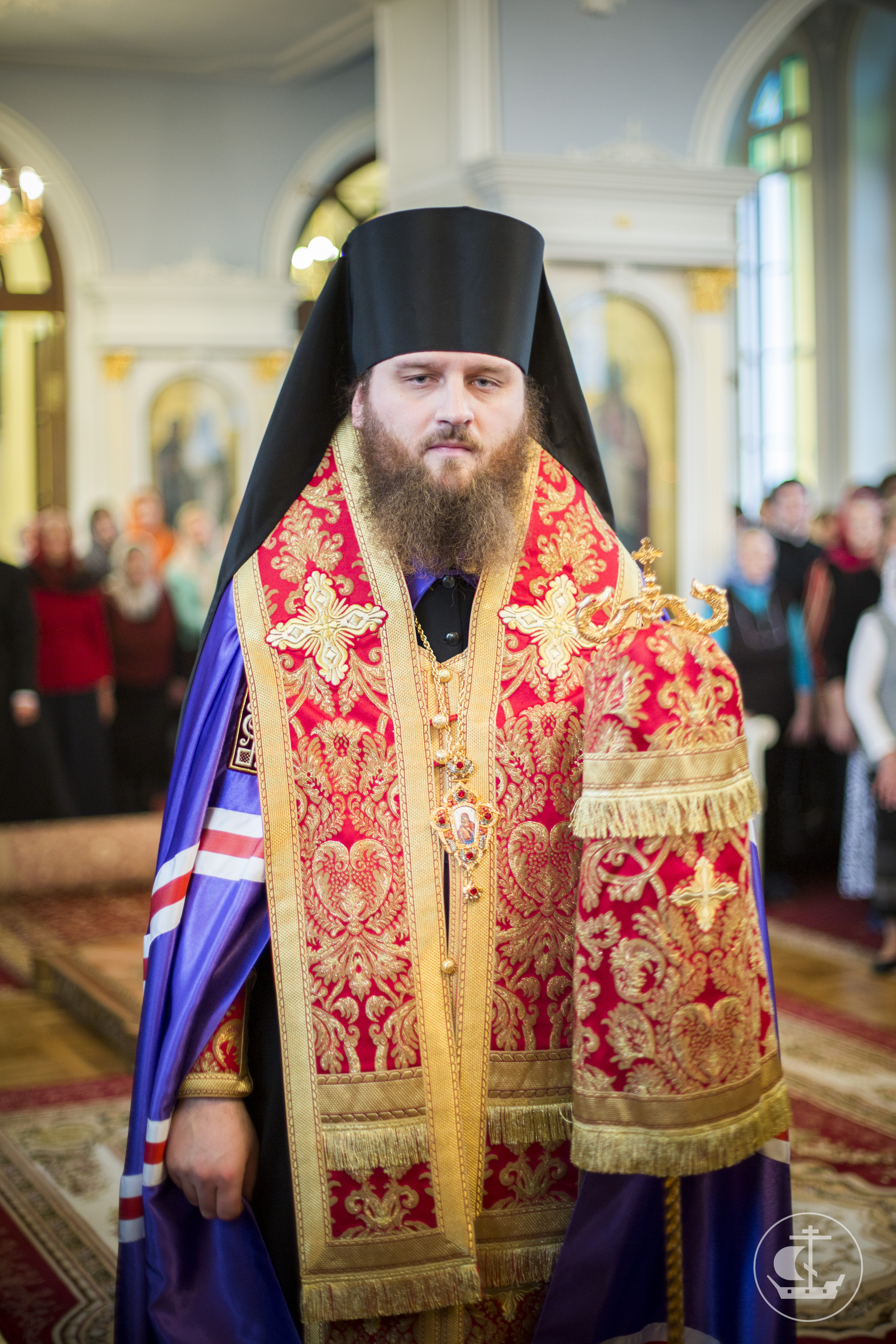
Bishop Constantine at the All-Night Vigil in the Academic Church at Saint Petersburg Theological Academy. October 8, 2013

On December 20, 2012, at the annual Diocesan meeting of the Moscow Oblast Diocese, he was elected a member of the Diocesan Council for 3 years.

On March 12, 2013, he was appointed chairman of the Attestation Commission of the Moscow Oblast Diocese, which was established at the same day. On June 25, 2013, he was appointed Head of the St. Sergius of Radonezh Bible and Theological Courses of the Moscow Oblast Diocese.

On June 2, 2014, at the Moscow Theological Academy he defended his thesis "The history and teaching of the "Church of the Last Testament" (Vissarion sect)." According to the results of the defense, the degree of candidate of theology (similar to PhD) was awarded.

On October 23, 2014, he was introduced into the Inter-Council Presence of the Russian Orthodox Church.

In 2014, he was appointed co-chairman of the Coordinating Council for Cooperation between the Ministry of Education of the Moscow Oblast and the Moscow Oblast Diocese.

In 2015, he was elected vice-president of the Association of Teachers of Spiritual and Moral (Orthodox) Culture of the Moscow Oblast.

On April 10, 2019, he was appointed head of Basic training courses in the field of theology for monks of the Moscow Oblast Diocese.

On August 25, 2020, by decision of the Holy Synod of the Russian Orthodox Church, he was appointed chairman of the commission of the Inter-Council Presence on Worship and Church Art.

On April 13, 2021, Holy Synod of the ROC appointed him to be the vicar of metropolitan Krutitsy and Kolomna. On July 14, 2021, he was appointed chairman of the Attestation Commission the Diocese of Kolomna.

By the decision of the Council of Bishops of the Metropolitanate of Moscow, he was appointed chairman of the Inter-Diocesan Department for the Coordination of Spiritual, Educational and Educational activities. He also became co-chairman of the Coordination Council for Cooperation between the Metropolitanate of Moscow and the Ministry of Education of the Moscow Oblast.

On July 1, 2022, by the decision of the Academic Council of the Moscow Theological Academy, he was elected an honorary member of the latter.

On August 25, 2022, by the decision of the Holy Synod of the Russian Orthodox Church, he was transferred vicar of the Patriarch of Moscow and All Russia, with instructions to head the newly created Missionary department of the Moscow City Diocese, with the dismissal of the rector of the Kolomna Theological Seminary and expressing gratitude for the hard work.

On September 14, 2022, by decree of Patriarch Kirill, he was appointed rector of the Church of St. Philip, Metropolitan of Moscow in the Meshchanskaya Sloboda of Moscow.

On August 24, 2023, by the decision of the Holy Synod of the Russian Orthodox Church, he was included in the Synodal Liturgical Commission.

On October 11, 2023, by the decision of the Holy Synod of the Russian Orthodox Church, he was appointed Acting Patriarchal Exarch of Africa. By his own admission, at that time he hardly knew English.

On February 16, 2024, the Holy Synod of the Greek Orthodox Patriarchate of Alexandria decided to defrock Bishop Constantine. In an interview with RIA Novosti he declared non-recognition of this decision: "I am the bishop of the Russian Orthodox Church, I obey the Patriarch of Moscow and All Russia as his vicar and the Holy Synod of the Russian Orthodox Church as any of its bishops". On March 12, 2024, the Holy Synod of the Russian Orthodox Church decided "to consider illegal and invalid the decision of the Synod of the Patriarchate of Alexandria on the "defrocking" of the acting Patriarchal Exarch of Africa, Bishop Constantine of Zaraisk," and also approved him as Patriarchal Exarch of Africa.

On March 24, 2024, in the Cathedral of Christ the Saviour, Moscow, in connection with the confirmation of the Patriarchal exarch of Africa, he was elevated to the rank of metropolitan by Patriarch Kirill.

On August 29, 2024, by decree of Patriarch Kirill, he was relieved of the post of chairman of the Missionary Department of the Moscow (city) diocese with an expression of gratitude for the work he had done.

On July 24, 2025, by the decision of the Holy Synod of the ROC, he was appointed ruling bishop of the Diocese of North Africa with the title of "Cairo and North Africa", while remaining interim administrator of the Diocese of South Africa.

== Literature ==
- "Новые назначения в Московской епархии". Московские епархиальные ведомости (in Russian) (9–10). 2012.
- Константин (Островский) // Православная энциклопедия. — М., 2015. — Т. XXXVII : «Константин — Корин». — С. 20–21.
