= İnkaya =

- Village
- Location within Turkey
- Coordinates: 40°11′N 42°22′E
- Country: Turkey
- Province: Kars
- District: Sarıkamış
- Elevation: 1,830 m (6,000 ft)
- Population (2022): 991
- Time zone: UTC+3 (TRT)
- Postal code: 36500
- Area code: 0474

İnkaya is a village in Sarıkamış District of Kars Province, Turkey. Its population is 991 (2022). The distance to Sarıkamış is 45 kilometres (28 mi) and to Kars is 99 kilometres (62 mi).
