= Diocese of Yerevan and Armenia =

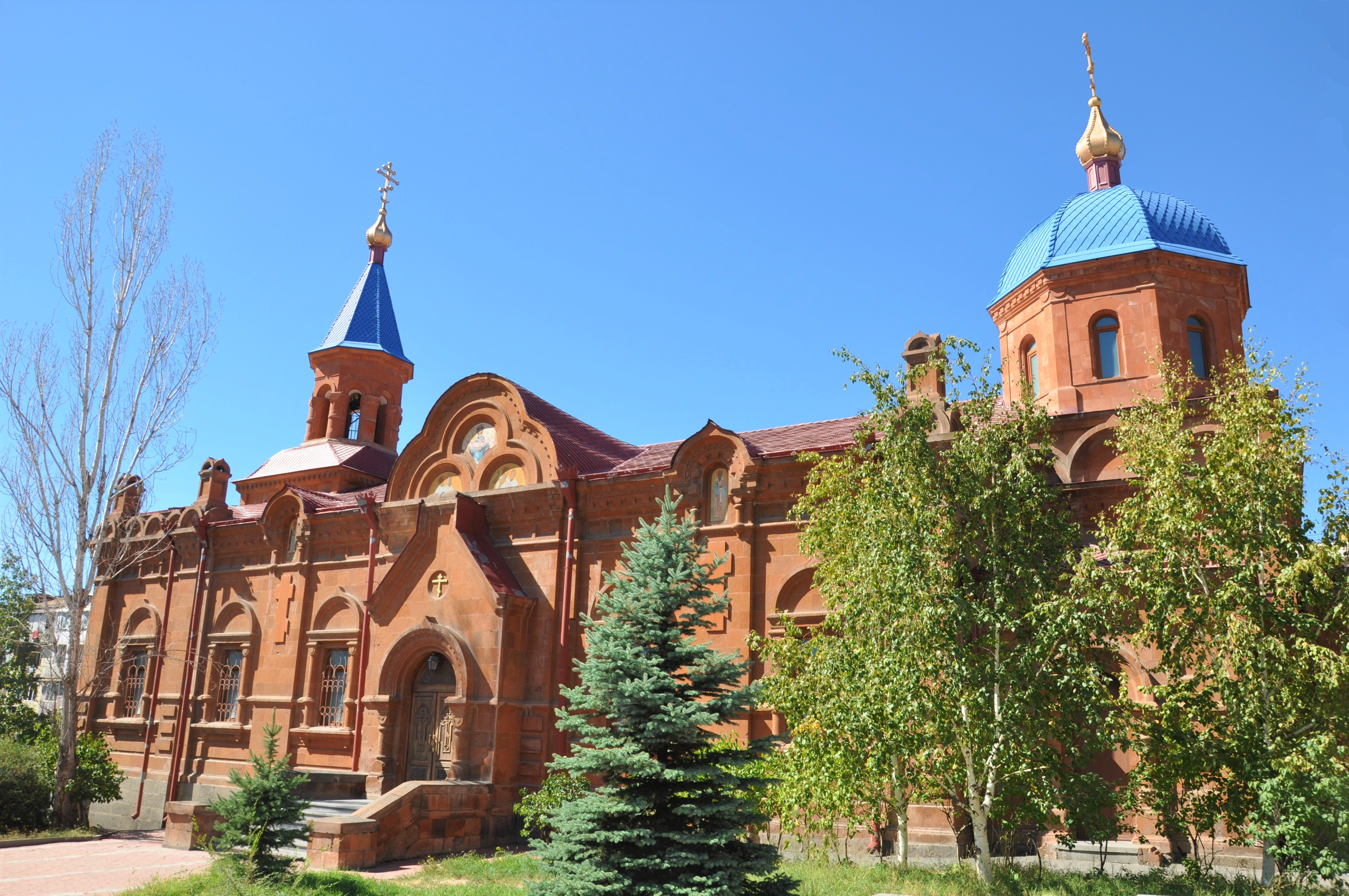
Church of the Intercession of the Holy Mother of God, Yerevan

Diocese of Yerevan and Armenia (Yerevan-Armenian Diocese, Russian: Ереванско-Армянская епархия) is a diocese of the Russian Orthodox Church in the territory of Armenia with its center in the city of Yerevan.

== History ==
On December 13, 1912, by the decision of the Most Holy Synod, the Vicariate of Yerevan within the Diocese of Mtskheta and Kartali of the Georgian Exarchate was established to care for the Eastern Orthodox people in the territories of historical Armenia, which are part of the Russian Empire. This vicariate nursed the Orthodox population of the Erivan Governorate, the Kars oblast and, probably, the Lori volost of Borchaly uezd of Tiflis Governorate.

After the proclamation of autocephaly of the Georgian Orthodox Church in March 1917, on July 10, 1917, the Caucasian Exarchate was established for Russian and other non-Georgian Orthodox parishes of Transcaucasia, whose jurisdiction also included the Vicariate of Yerevan, possibly as a diocese. By that time, the vicariate had over 30 Orthodox churches in Alexandropol, Kars, Yerevan, Sarıkamış, Karakurt, Kağızman, Jalaloghli, Kanaker, Oltu, in the villages of Arzni, Dimitrov, Ankavan and other settlements.

The Local Council of the Orthodox Russian Church of 1917-1918 from the Erivan Vicariate was attended by the cleric of the Kars Cathedral of the Transfiguration of the Savior, priest Alexy Paraskevov and the inspector of public schools Nilolay Politov, who lived in Kars.

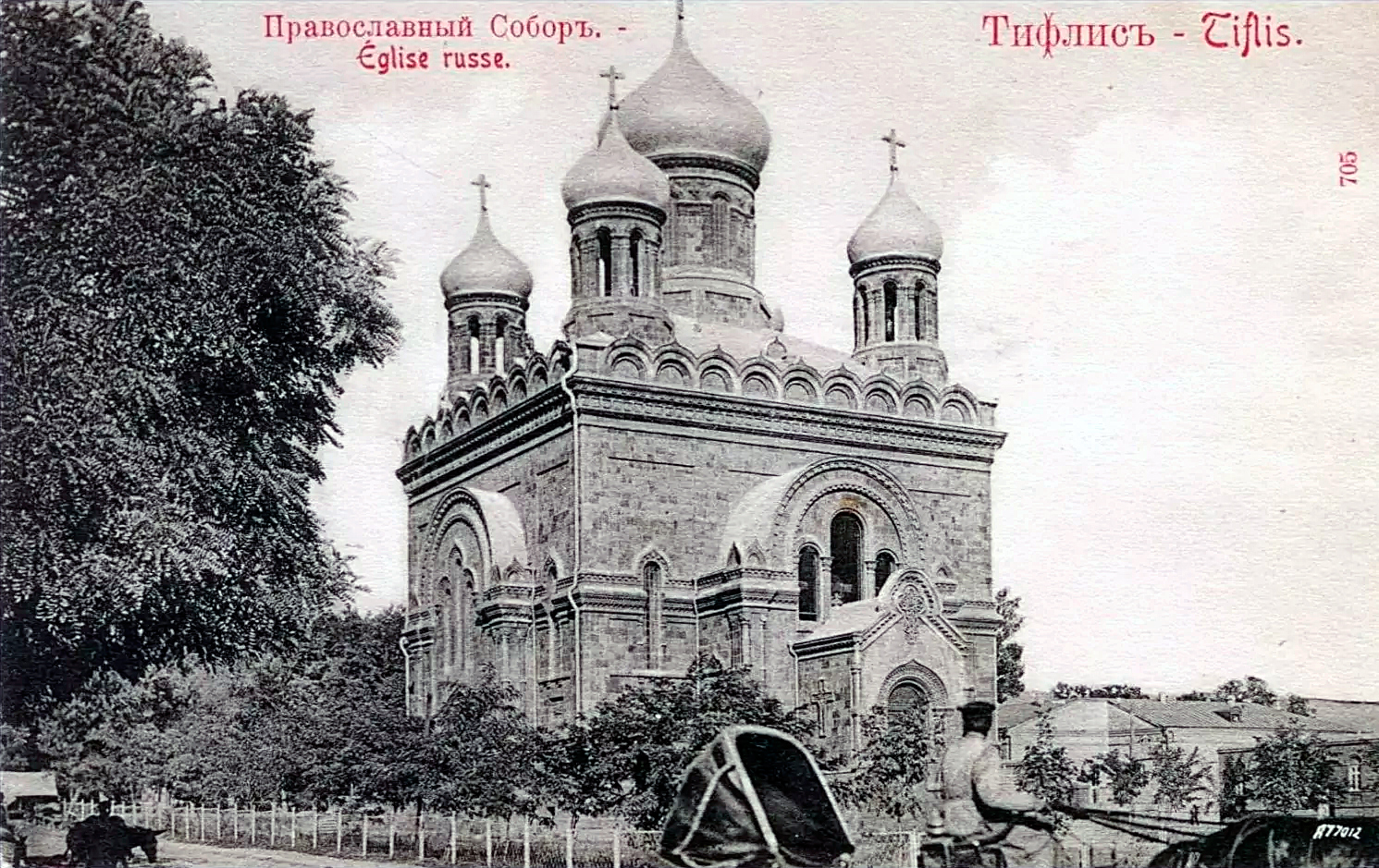
St. Nicholas the Wonderworker Cathedral on Sobornaya Square (now Shahumyan Square) in Yerevan. Demolished in 1926

It may have been created as a full-fledged diocese during this period (exact date is unknown). Thus, it is known that on November 30, 1924, Archimandrite Anthony (Romanovsky) was consecrated Bishop of Yerevan by Patriarch Tikhon of Moscow and All Russia. Simultaneously with the consecration, Bishop Anthony was appointed administrator of the Diocese of Sukhumi of the Russian Orthodox Church (according to other sources, he was consecrated bishop of Sukhumi and Yerevan). In January 1927, Bishop Anthony was arrested and placed in Butyrka prison, later exiled to the Mari Autonomous Oblast, on February 27 (or March 12), 1929, he was moved to the Diocese of Don. On November 23, 1928 — April 3, 1930, the Diocese of Yerevan, as well as the Diocese of Sukhumi, were governed by Bishop Seraphim (Protopopov) of Baku. No other managers of this department were known at that time. Perhaps the parishes of the Russian Orthodox Church in Armenia continued to be governed by the subsequent bishops of Baku: Nikon (Purlevsky) (1930), Valerian (Rudich) (1930–1931), and then the temporary governors of the Diocese of Baku bishops Mitrophan (Polikarpov) (1931–1933) and Alexander (Rayevsky) (1933). But since 1933, the see of Baku has been vacant.

On November 19, 1943, the Holy Synod of the Russian Orthodox Church, having restored Eucharistic communion with the Georgian Orthodox Church, among other things, decided: "to ask His Holiness the Patriarch-Catholicos take upon himself also the ecclesiastical affairs of Orthodox Russian parishes located in Armenia, which, although they live outside the Georgian SSR, but in terms of distance and other similar for external reasons, they find it difficult to turn to appropriate Russian ecclesiastical authority".

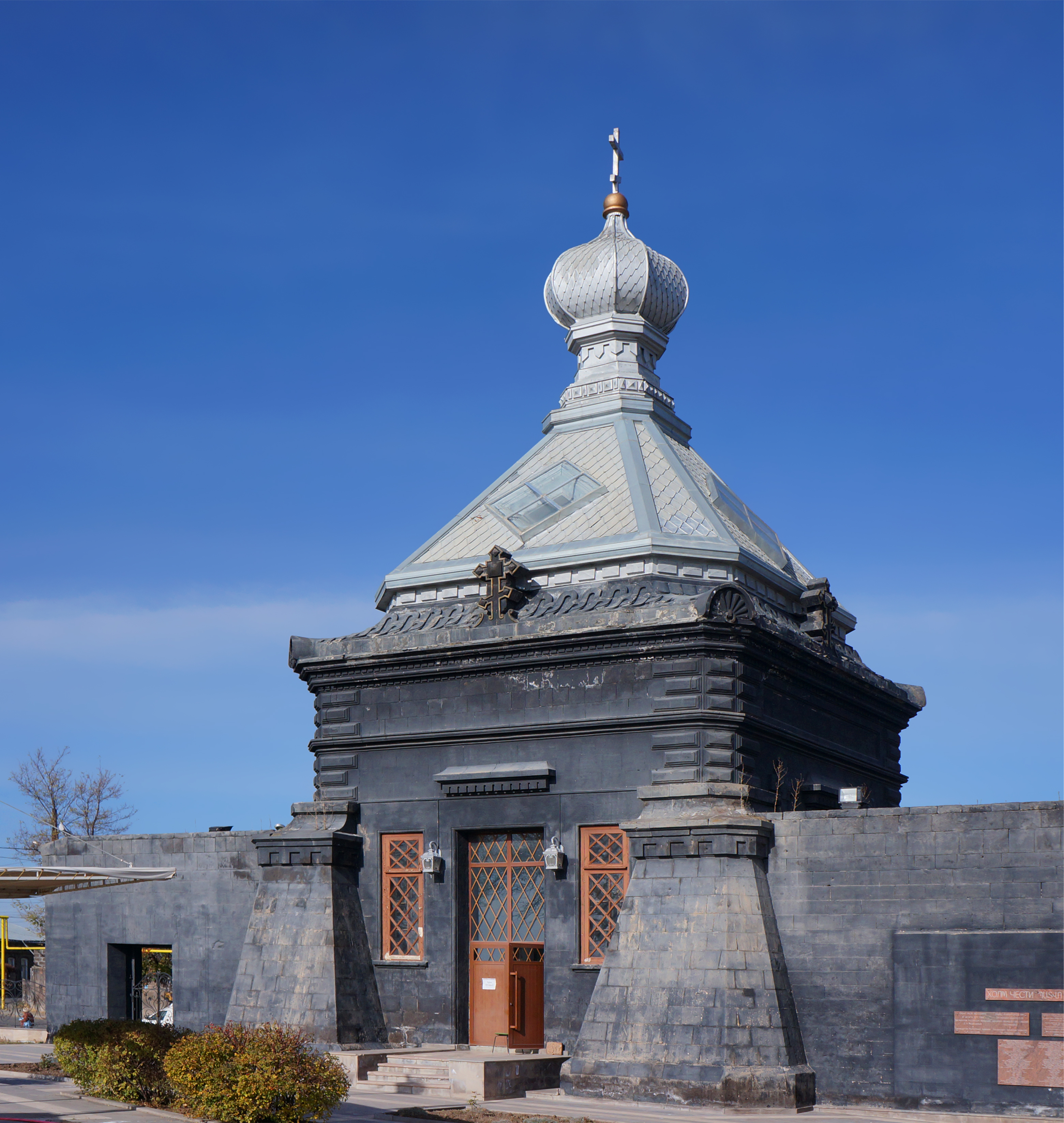
Church of the Archangel Michael in Gyumri

The historian of the Russian Orthodox Church in Armenia, Hieromonk David (Abramyan), counted a total of about sixty Russian Orthodox parishes that existed on the territory of Armenia and Karabakh during the tsarist period. During the Soviet period, almost all of them were closed, and many were destroyed.

In 1989, Patriarch Pimen of Moscow and All Russia, in response to an appeal from the community of the village of Dimitrov in the Artashat district, sent Hieromonk Macarius (Oganesyan) to serve in the church in the name of the martyrs Kirik and Iulitta. Hieromonk Macarius became the first priest of the Russian Orthodox Church in the post-war period who came to serve permanently in Armenia.

Russian Russian Orthodox parishes have been subordinated to the Diocese of Krasnodar and Kuban since 1991. Since October 1994, the parishes of the Moscow Patriarchate on the territory of Armenia were part of the Diocese of Maykop, and then of the Diocese of Yekaterinodar.

Russian Russian Orthodox Church in Armenia, according to Archpriest Arseniy Grigoryants, in the early 1990s, the majority of parishioners of the Russian Orthodox Church in Armenia were Slavic origin, but many left during the parade of sovereignty, when nationalist outbursts with ill-will towards Russians began everywhere, and by 2016, "our community, according to unofficial estimates, consists of eighty percent ethnic Armenians. The rest are Russians, Ukrainians, Belarusians; there are Greeks, Georgians, Yezidis, Kurds. Of course, they are mostly Russian-speaking, but there are many people with Armenian education."

On December 27, 2016, the Holy Synod, having considered the issue of the archpastoral care of the parishes of the Russian Orthodox Church in the Republic of Armenia, formed the patriarchal deanery as part of the parishes located in the Republic of Armenia. As of November 2019, the deanery consisted of 8 churches in which divine services were regularly performed and 5 priests obeyed.

On October 15, 2021, by the decision of the Holy Synod of the Russian Orthodox Church, the Diocese of Yerevan and Armenia was established with a see in Yerevan. Archbishop Leonid (Gorbachov) of Klin, vicar of the Patriarch of Moscow and All Russia, has been appointed the ruling bishop with the title "Yerevan and Armenian". On March 23, 2023, the Ministry of Justice of the Republic of Armenia officially registered as a church organization "Yerevan and Armenian Diocese of the Russian Orthodox Church"

== Literature ==
- Н. Т.-М., Л. Масиель Санчес (2008). "Ереванское викариатство". Православная энциклопедия. Vol. XVIII : «Египет древний — Эфес». Moscow. pp. 593–597.
- Степанянц С. М. К истории деятельности Русской Православной церкви в Армении // Научные ведомости Белгородского государственного университета. Серия: История. Политология. — 2008. — No. 2 (42). — С. 42–47.
- Блохин В. С. Возникновение храмов Русской православной церкви в Эривани в XIX — начале XX века // Вестник Рязанского государственного университета. — Рязань, 2020. — No. 2 (67). — С. 16–24.
