= Birnur Fertekligil =

Turkish diplomat (born 1968)

Emine Birnur Fertekligil
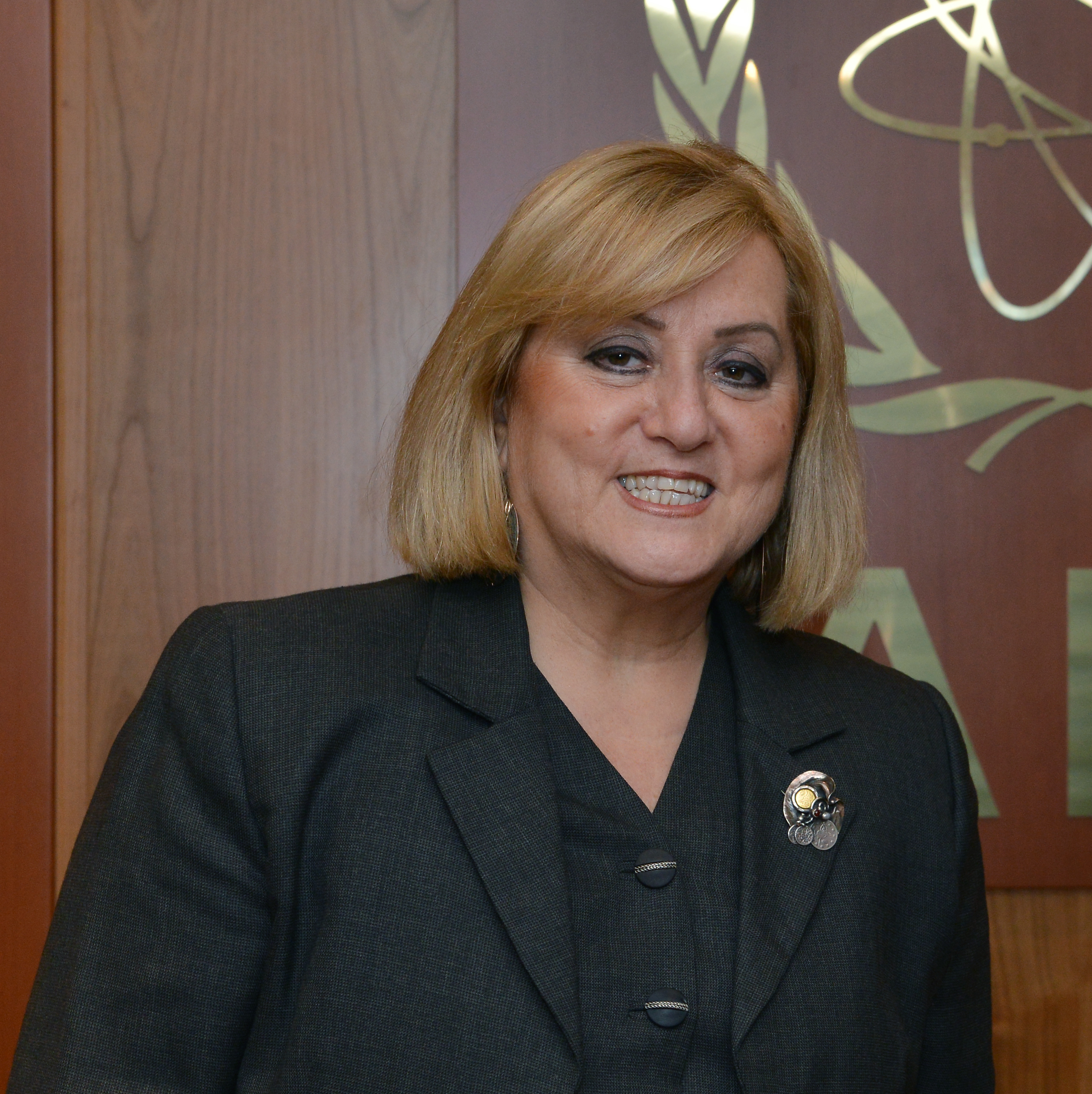

Turkey Permanent Representative to UN (Vienna)
- In office 15 November 2013 – 15 February 2018
- President: Recep Tayyip Erdoğan
- Preceded by: Tomur Bayer
- Succeeded by: Ahmet Muhtar Gün

Personal details
- Born: 1955 (age 70–71) Ankara
- Education: University of Ankara
- Profession: Diplomat

Emine Birnur Fertekligil (born 1955 in Ankara) is a Turkish diplomat. She served as Turkey's ambassador to Belarus and as Turkey's permanent representative to the United Nations and other organizations in Vienna.

She attended Edgar Quintet High School in France, and holds a bachelor's degree in political science from the University of Ankara.

She has served in different positions in the Turkish foreign affairs ministry in Ankara and various Turkish embassies;

Year	Position	Location
1978-1980	Probationary political officer, Third secretary, department of international economic organizations	Ankara
1983-1985	Third secretary, Second secretary, Turkey embassy in France	Paris
1985-1987	First secretary, Deputy directorate general for multilateral economic relations	Ankara
1987-1991	First secretary, Counsellor, Permanent mission of Turkey to the European community	Brussels
1991-1993	First secretary, Head of Section, Special adviser to the Undersecretary of the ministry of foreign affairs	Ankara
1997-2001	Head of department, department of international political organizations	Ankara
2001-2004	Deputy directorate general, Western European department	Ankara
2004-2007	Ambassador of Turkey to Belarus	Minsk
2007-2009	Ambassador, department of financial and administrative affairs	Ankara
2009-2010	Directorate general, department of multilateral political affairs	Ankara
2010-2013	Deputy undersecretary, department of Africa, multilateral political affairs and cultural affairs	Ankara
2013-2018	Permanent representative to the United Nations and other organizations	Vienna

Fertekligil represented Turkey at the International Atomic Energy Agency (IAEA), She is an alumna of International Gender Champions (IGC), “a leadership network that brings together decision-makers determined to break down gender barriers and make gender equality a working reality in their spheres of influence”. She also made remarkable speeches on women rights, the right to self determination, elimination of racism and racial discrimination among others. She speaks English and French.
