= Allahuekber Mountains =

Mountain range in northeastern Turkey

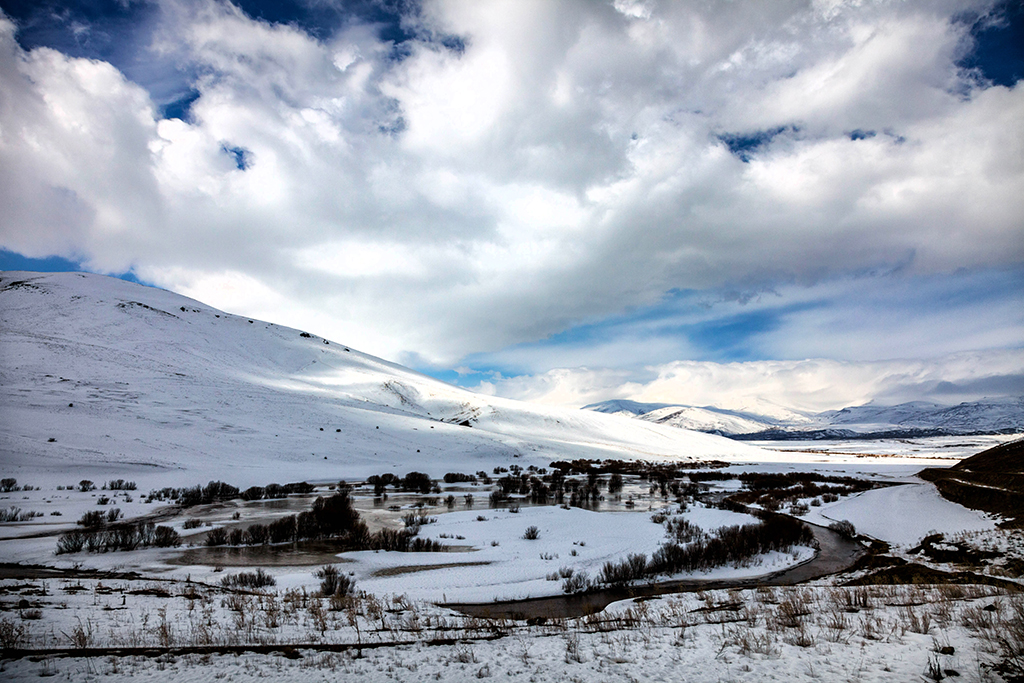
- View of mountains

Highest point
- Elevation: 3,120 m (10,240 ft)
- Coordinates: 40°34′05″N 42°31′53″E

Dimensions
- Length: 40 km (25 mi)
- Width: 20 km (12 mi)

Geography
- Location within Turkey Location within Caucasus Mountains Location within Europe
- Location: Kars Province, Ardahan Province, Erzurum Province, Turkey

Allahuekber Mountains (Turkish: Allahuekber Dağları, which means "Allahu akbar Mountains"), is a mountain range in northeastern Turkey. It is located on the border of Erzurum, Kars and Ardahan provinces. It is part of the Pontic Mountains.

When World War I began in 1914, the range was astride the border between the Ottoman Empire and the Russian Empire during the Caucasus campaign. Turkish troops suffered a disaster during the Battle of Sarikamish, when they were ordered to recapture the Kars area, which was then part of the Russian Empire. Thousands of Turkish soldiers under the command of Enver Pasha died of hypothermia in the winter snow of the Allahuekber Mountains.

In January 2022, a statue made of snow in memory of Ottoman soldiers that froze to death in WWI was unveiled in Sarıkamış district.
