= Leonid Gorbachov =

Russian Orthodox bishop (born 1968)

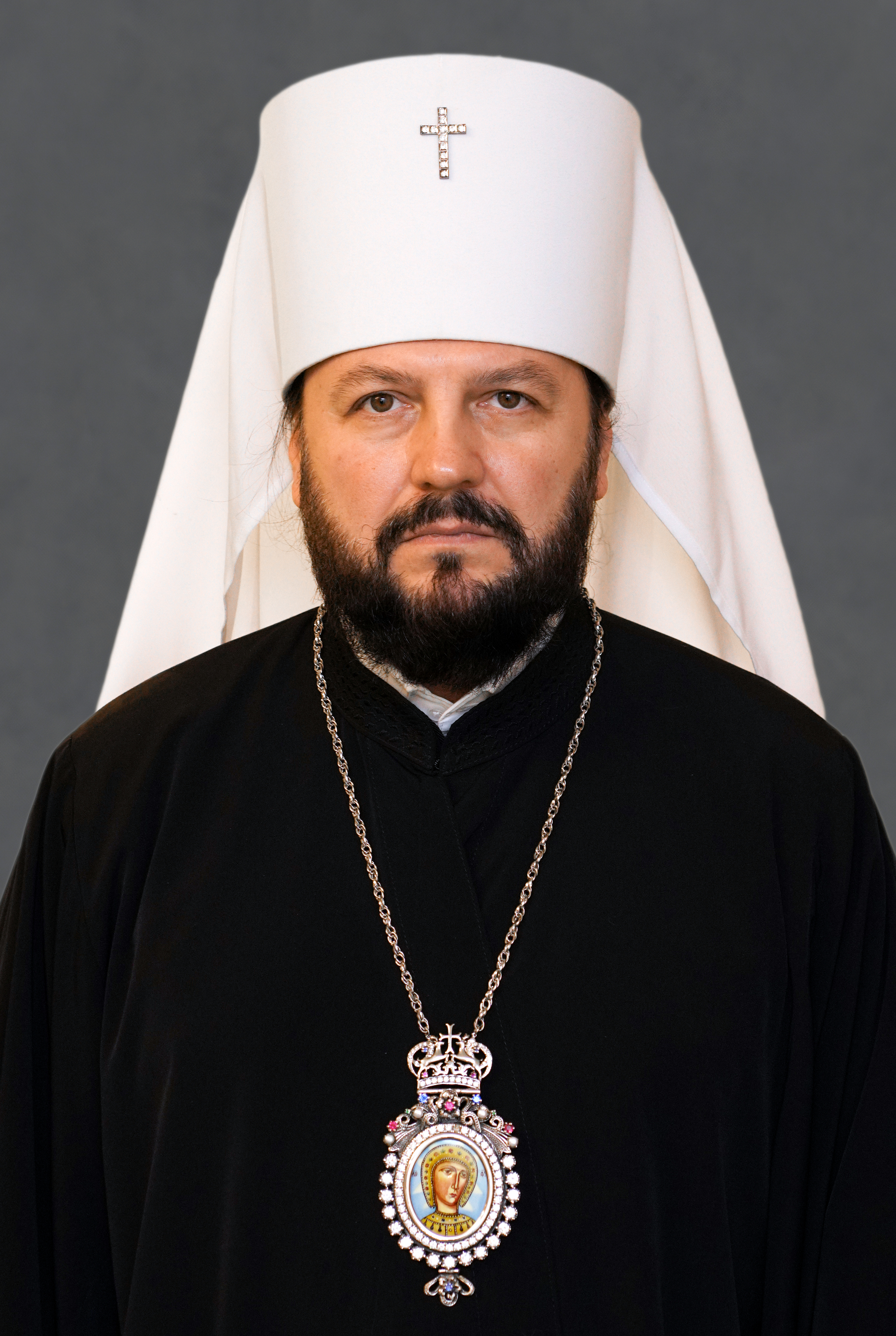
Leonid Gorbachov in 2022

Metropolitan Leonid (secular name Leonid Eduardovich Gorbachov, Russian: Леонид Эдуардович Горбачёв; born 26 October 1968, Stavropol) is a retired bishop of the Russian Orthodox Church. He holds the title "Metropolitan of Klin". Former Patriarchal Exarch of Africa (2021–2023).

== Biography ==
=== Early life ===
He was born on 26 October 1968, in Stavropol. Since 1970, his family lived in Krasnodar. He graduated from high school in 1985. In 1985–1986, he was a laboratory assistant. During those same years, he was the sexton of St. George's Church in Krasnodar. In 1986-1988 he served in the Armed Forces of the USSR.

In 1988–1989, he was a reader-singer of St. George's Church in Krasnodar and subdeacon of Bishop Isidore (Kirichenko) of Krasnodar and Kuban. In 1989-1992 he studied at the Leningrad Theological Seminary.

=== Deacon and priest ===
On 8 April 1990, he was ordained a deacon. On June 18, 1990, he was tonsured a monk, and on 8 October 1990, he was ordained a hieromonk. In 1990-1997 he was a full-time cleric of St. Catherine Cathedral in Krasnodar. In 1995-1997 he was the sacristan of same cathedral.

Since 1997, he has been an employee within the Moscow Patriarchate of the Synodal Department for Relations with the Armed Forces and Law Enforcement Agencies (in Moscow).

From March to September 1998, he was on a business trip as part of the Russian separate airborne brigade of the contingent of the United Nations Mission in Bosnia and Herzegovina, where, as he later recalled, he had to face "unprecedented blatant injustice against an Eastern Orthodox people".

From October 1998 to September 2002, he studied at the Theological Department of the National and Kapodistrian University of Athens, was a minor cleric of the Russian lower Church of the Great Martyr Panteleimon in Agios Pandeleimonas in Athens, Greece.

Since October 2002, he has been an employee of the Secretariat of Inter-E. Orthodox Relations of the Department for External Church Relations of the Moscow Patriarchate.

On 30 July 2003, by the decision of the Holy Synod of the ROC, he was appointed a member of the Russian Ecclesiastical Mission in Jerusalem.

On December 24, 2004, by the decision of the Holy Synod of the ROC, he was dismissed from the post of a member of the Russian Ecclesiastical Mission in Jerusalem and he was appointed rector of the Metochion of the Russian Orthodox Church in Alexandria and the Church of Demetrius of Thessaloniki in Cairo, Representative of the Patriarch of Moscow and All Russia to the Pope and Patriarch of Alexandria and all Africa.

On 25–29 September 2007, as part of the delegation of the Russian Orthodox Church, he attended the celebrations dedicated to the 2000th anniversary of the Birth of Christ according to the Ethiopian calendar.

In June 2009, he attended the meeting of Patriarch Theodore II of Alexandria and President of the Russian Federation Dmitry Medvedev in Cairo.

On 11 April 2010, at the metochion of the Russian Orthodox Church in Cairo, Patriarch Kirill of Moscow, during his visit to the Patriarchate of Alexandria, elevated him to the rank of Archimandrite.

=== Bishop ===
On 29 May 2013, the Holy Synod of the ROC elected him Bishop of Argentina and South America.

On 11 June 2013, at the patriarchal and synodal residence of the Danilov Monastery, he was nominated as bishop.

On 17 June 2013, in the Church of St. Igor of Chernigov in Peredelkino, he was consecrated Bishop of Argentina and South America. The consecration was performed by Patriarch Kirill of Moscow and All Russia, Metropolitan Barsanuphius (Sudakov) of Saransk and Mordovia, Metropolitan Hilarion (Alfeyev) of Volokolamsk, Archbishop Arsenius (Yepifanov) of Istra, Archbishop Mark (Golovkov) of Yegoryevsk, Bishop Sergius (Chashin) of Solnechnogorsk, Bishop Tikhon (Zaitsev) of Podolsk.

On 16 July 2013, he was dismissed from the post of representative of the Patriarch of Moscow and All Russia to the Patriarch of Alexandria and All Africa. In August of the same year, he handed over the affairs at the metochion in Cairo to priest Viktor Kulaga, and left for South America.

He visited all twenty countries of the diocese entrusted to him. The diocese itself was experiencing growth at that time, but faced serious difficulties: a shortage of clergy, lack of legal registration of parishes, chronic lack of funds, the presence of ROCOR parishes that did not adopt the 2007 Act of Canonical Communion. At the same time, there were very few Russian enterprises and wealthy compatriots able to provide charitable assistance in Latin America.

On 3 June 2016, by the decision of the Holy Synod of the ROC, he was appointed Bishop of Vladikavkaz and Alania.

In October 2016, the Vladikavkaz Theological College ceased its activities due to the fact that it had not organized a full-fledged educational process that meets the modern requirements of the education system, which was required by the ongoing reform of the theological schools of the Russian Orthodox Church. At the same time, in the same autumn, an agreement was reached between the Vladikavkaz Diocese and the North Ossetian State University to open a theological department at this university.

On 27 December 2016, by the decision of the Holy Synod of the Russian Orthodox Church, he was appointed administrator of the Patriarchal Parishes in Armenia. On February 15, 2017, he met with Catholicos Karekin II.

On 4 December 2017, in accordance with the new regulations on awards, Patriarch Kirill of Moscow and All Russia was elevated to the rank of archbishop.

On 17 October 2019, at an extraordinary meeting of the Holy Synod of the ROC, he was appointed deputy chairman of the Department for External Church Relations while retaining the position of the ruling bishop of the Vladikavkaz diocese.

29 October 2019, by the decision of the Holy Synod of the ROC, he was appointed co-chairman of the working group on the coordination of bilateral relations between the Russian Orthodox Church and the Malankara Church.

On 11 March 2020, by the decision of the Holy Synod, he was appointed co-chairman of the Commission on Dialogue between the Russian Orthodox Church and the Ethiopian Church.

On 24 September 2021, by the decision of the Holy Synod of the ROC, he was released from the administration of the Vladikavkaz diocese and the post of the archimandrite of the Alan Assumption Monastery with an expression of gratitude for the labors incurred; he was appointed vicar of the Patriarch of Moscow and All Russia with the title "of Klin", with a stay in Moscow. In addition, in view of the "numerous appeals of the clergy of the Orthodox Church of Alexandria to His Holiness Patriarch Kirill of Moscow and All Russia with a request to accept them under the omophorion of the Moscow Patriarchate," he was instructed to "submit proposals to the Holy Synod after a thorough study of the received appeals".

On 15 October 2021, by the decision of the Holy Synod of the ROC, in connection with the formation of the Diocese of Yerevan and Armenia, he was appointed its administrator, while retaining the post of deputy chairman of the Department for External Church Relations.

On 29 December 2021, by the decision of the Holy Synod, he was appointed Patriarchal Exarch of Africa with the assignment of the administration of the North African Diocese and the interim administration of the South African Diocese and the dismissal of the deputy chairman of the DECR and the preservation of the interim administration of the Yerevan-Armenian Diocese.

On 7 January 2022, in the Cathedral of Christ the Savior in Moscow, Patriarch Kirill of Moscow and All Russia elevated him to the rank of Metropolitan.

On 22 November 2022, Leonid was defrocked by the Holy Synod of the Patriarchate of Alexandria and All Africa for "… a series of canonical offenses", such as "inheritance in the jurisdiction of the Church’s pontificate, distribution of the holy myrrh, enticing local clergy and, propagating ethno-tribalism, or ethno-phyletism". Metropolitan Leonid stated that this decision is "canonically insignificant" and will have absolutely no effect on his ministry: "Only the Church in which I serve can deprive me of my dignity. ...it's like if the President of Russia by his decree dismissed the Minister of Defense of Great Britain". On December 29, 2022, the Holy Synod of the Russian Orthodox Church, reacting to this, decided: "based on the universally recognized principle rooted in the canons and tradition of the non-jurisdiction of the clergy of one autocephalous Church to the court of another autocephalous Church, to consider the decision of the Synod of the Patriarchate of Alexandria on the "defrocking" of the Patriarchal exarch of Africa, Metropolitan Leonid of Klin, and all other similar decisions regarding the clergy of the Russian Orthodox Churches that have no canonical force and are invalid".

On 21 June 2023 he decried the May 2022 self-declared separation of the Ukrainian Orthodox Church (Moscow Patriarchate) of the ROC and declared that the Russian Orthodox Church would absorb its dioceses in areas of Ukraine occupied by Russia (in the Russian invasion of Ukraine).
