= Sarıkamış District =

District of Kars Province, Turkey

- District
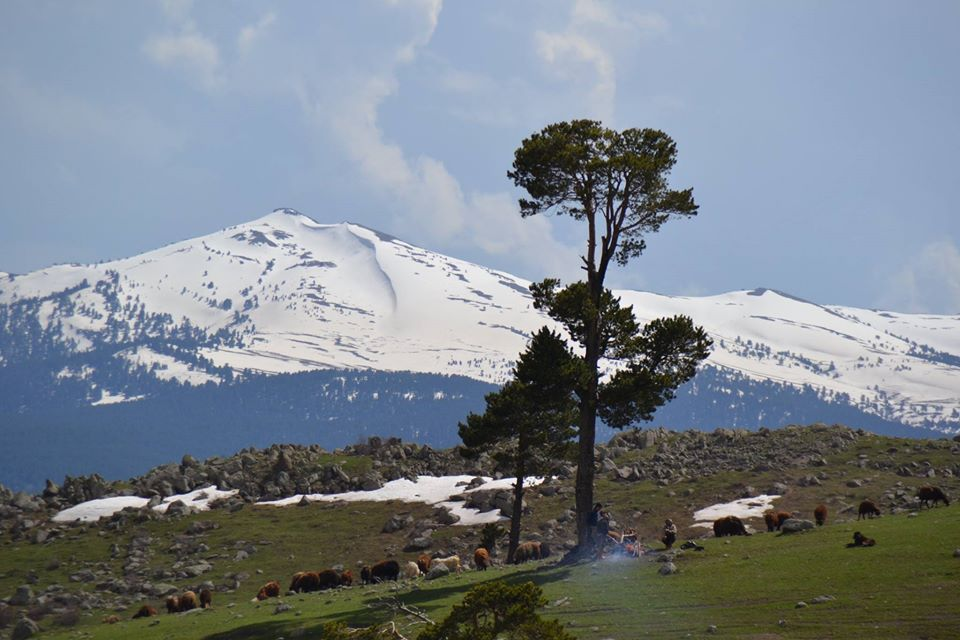
- Sarıkamış landscape

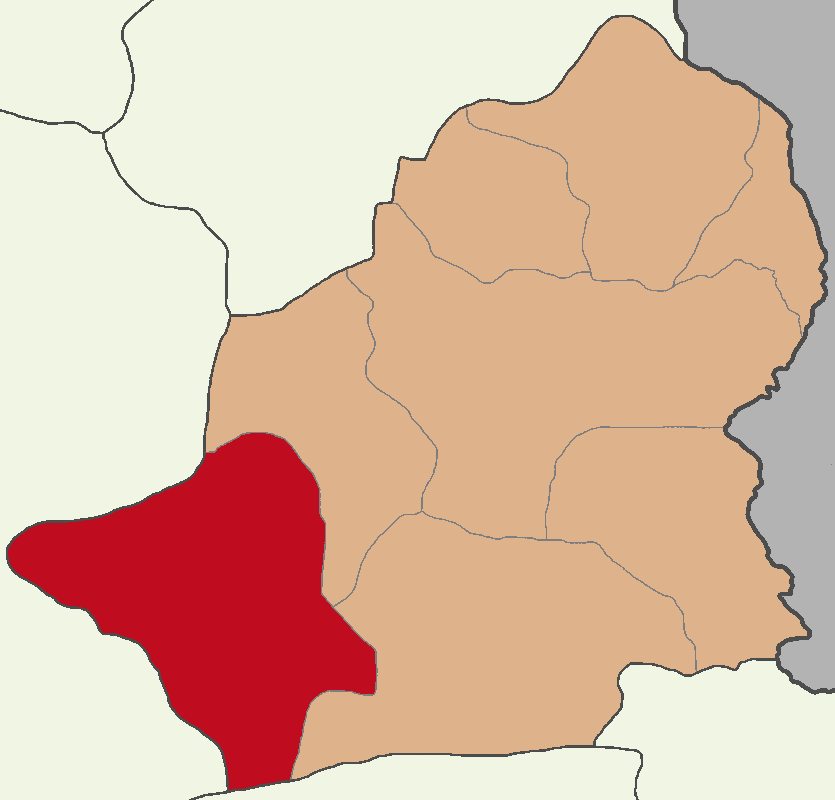
- Map showing Sarıkamış District in Kars Province

- Location within Turkey
- Coordinates: 40°20′N 42°34′E
- Country: Turkey
- Province: Kars
- Seat: Sarıkamış

Government
  - Kaymakam: Doğan Kemelek
- Area: 2,038 km^{2} (787 sq mi)
- Population (2022): 37,744
  - Density: 18.52/km^{2} (47.97/sq mi)
- Time zone: UTC+3 (TRT)
- Website: www.sarikamis.gov.tr

Sarıkamış District is a district of the Kars Province of Turkey. Its seat is the town of Sarıkamış. Its area is 2,038 km^{2}, and its population is 37,744 (2022).

The Sarıkamış district neighbours the districts of Selim and Kağızman to east, Şenkaya and Horasan to the west, Eleşkirt to the south, Selim and Şenkaya to the north and occupies an area of 1,732 km (1,076 mi). Its average altitude is 1,500 to 2,000 metres (4,900 to 6,600 ft), and Aladag Mountain, at 3,138 metres (10,295 ft), is within its borders. Other important mountains are Süphan, Balıklı (2,835 m [9,301 ft]), Kösedağı (2,599 m [8,527 ft]), Çıplakdağ (2,634 m [8,642 ft]) and Soğanlı (2,849 m [9,347 ft]). The Kars and Aras rivers flow through it.

== Composition ==
There is one municipality in Sarıkamış District:

- Sarıkamış

There are 56 villages in Sarıkamış District:

- Akkoz
- Akören
- Alisofu
- Altınbulak
- Armutlu
- Asboğa
- Aşağı Sallıpınar
- Balabantaş
- Balıklı
- Başköy
- Belencik
- Beşyol
- Boyalı
- Bozat
- Çamyazı
- Çardakçatı
- Çatak
- Çolaklı
- Eşmeçayır
- Gecikmez
- Güllüce
- Hamamlı
- Handere
- İnkaya
- Isısu
- Kalebaşı
- Karaköse
- Karakurt
- Karapınar
- Karaurgan
- Kayalıboğaz
- Kazantaş
- Kazıkkaya
- Kızılçubuk
- Koçoğlu
- Köroğlu
- Kozan
- Kurbançayırı
- Mescitli
- Odalar
- Ortakale
- Parmakdere
- Şehitemin
- Şehithalit
- Sırataşlar
- Sırbasan
- Süngütaşı
- Taşlıgüney
- Topkaya
- Uzungazi
- Yağıbasan
- Yarkaya
- Yayıklı
- Yenigazi
- Yeniköy
- Yukarı Sallıpınar
