= Soğuksu Nature Park =

Nature park in Sarıkamış, Kars, Turkey

- Soğuksu Tabiat Parkı
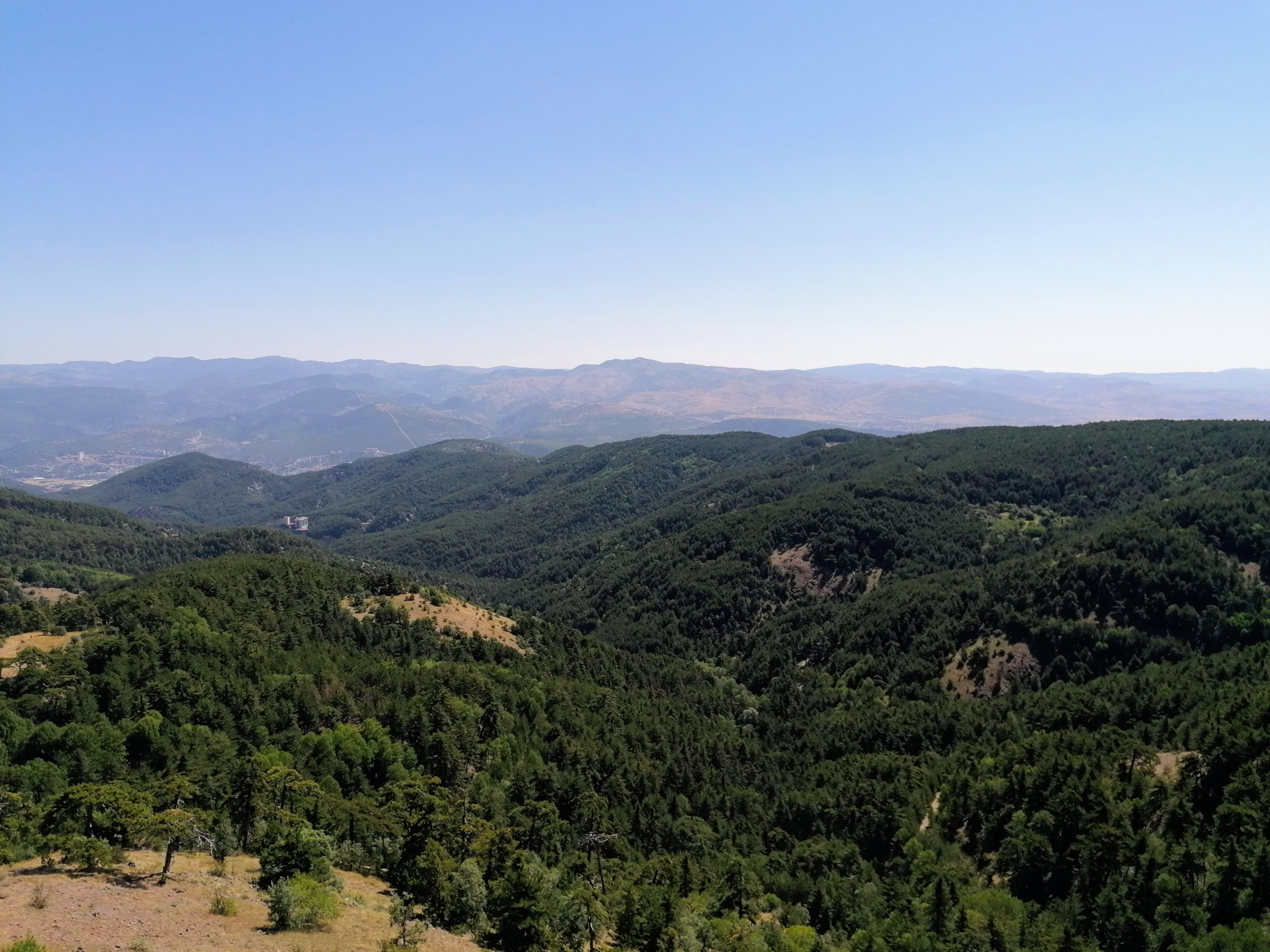

- Location within Turkey
- Location: Sarıkamış, Kars Province, Turkey
- Nearest city: Sarıkamış
- Coordinates: 40°18′36″N 42°38′05″E
- Area: 11 ha (27 acres)
- Established: 2011
- Governing body: Ministry of Forest and Water Management

Soğuksu Nature Park (Turkish: Soğuksu Tabiat Parkı), established in 2011, is a nature park in Eastern Anatolia region of Turkey. It is located 53 km (33 mi) far from Kars and 3 km (1.9 mi) to Sarıkamış.

The nature park covers an area of 11 ha (27 acres) at 2,121–2,152 m (6,959–7,060 ft) above main sea level.

== Geology ==
The area in and around of the nature park consists of basalt and dolomite rocks of Tertiary and Quaternary periods. Additionally, tuff, conglomerate and breccia are present.

== Flora ==
The nature park features forest stand of Scots pine (Pinus sylvestris). In the areas between the forest stands, quaking aspen (Populus tremula) grow. Othercommon plants are rose hip and buttercup (Ranunculus acris).

== Climate ==
The climate in the park shows characteristics of harsh continental climate. Long lasting winters are snowy, frostyand very cold. In winter time, more precipitation falls than in the summer period. The highest precipitation occurs just before the summer begins.
