= Yeniköy, Sarıkamış =

Village in Kars Province, Turkey

Yeniköy
- Village
- Location within Turkey
- Coordinates: 40°18′41″N 42°17′56″E
- Country: Turkey
- Province: Kars
- District: Sarıkamış
- Population (2022): 441
- Time zone: UTC+3 (TRT)

Yeniköy (Greek: Νεοχώρι) is a village in the Sarıkamış District, Kars Province, Turkey. It was founded in 1878 by Pontic Greek settlers who abandoned the region in 1919. As of 2022 , the village had a population of 441 people.

== History ==
Yeniköy was founded in 1878 by Pontic Greek Crypto-Christian settlers from Erzurum, Chaldia and Nicopolis shortly after the Kars Province was incorporated into the Russian Empire in the aftermath of the Russo-Turkish War (1877–1878). After founding the village its residents began practicing Orthodox Christianity openly once again, building a stone church in 1884. A school was also established at some point. In 1913, Yeniköy had a total population of 1029, by 1918 it had grown to approximately 1600 people. Most of the population was engaged in animal husbandry and farming.

On 3 March 1918, the Russian Soviet Federative Socialist Republic signed the Treaty of Brest-Litovsk with the Ottoman Empire, returning the Kars region to the Ottomans. In September 1919, fearing that their village will be affected by the Turkish–Armenian War, Yeniköy's residents abandoned their village for Kars. The men of the village attempted to return to their village to harvest their crops by were prevented from doing so by Armenian military personnel. Yeniköy's residents eventually fled further to Batumi. Greek refugees lived in camps in squalid conditions, suffering hunger and typhus. The Greek government began organizing evacuations in May 1919, and Yeniköy residents were eventually brought to Thessaloniki. High mortality caused by outbreaks of malaria caused the refugees to request the Greek government to allocate them housing in a mountainous area. Between 1921 and 1922 they were gradually resettled in the village of Notia.

Yeniköy is currently belongs to the Sarıkamış District, Kars Province, Turkey. As of 2022 the village had a population of 441 people.
