= Erzurum Eyalet =

Administrative division of the Ottoman Empire from 1533 to 1867

Erzurum Eyalet ایالت ارضروم (Ottoman Turkish) Eyālet-i Erżurūm
- Eyalet of the Ottoman Empire
- 1533–1867
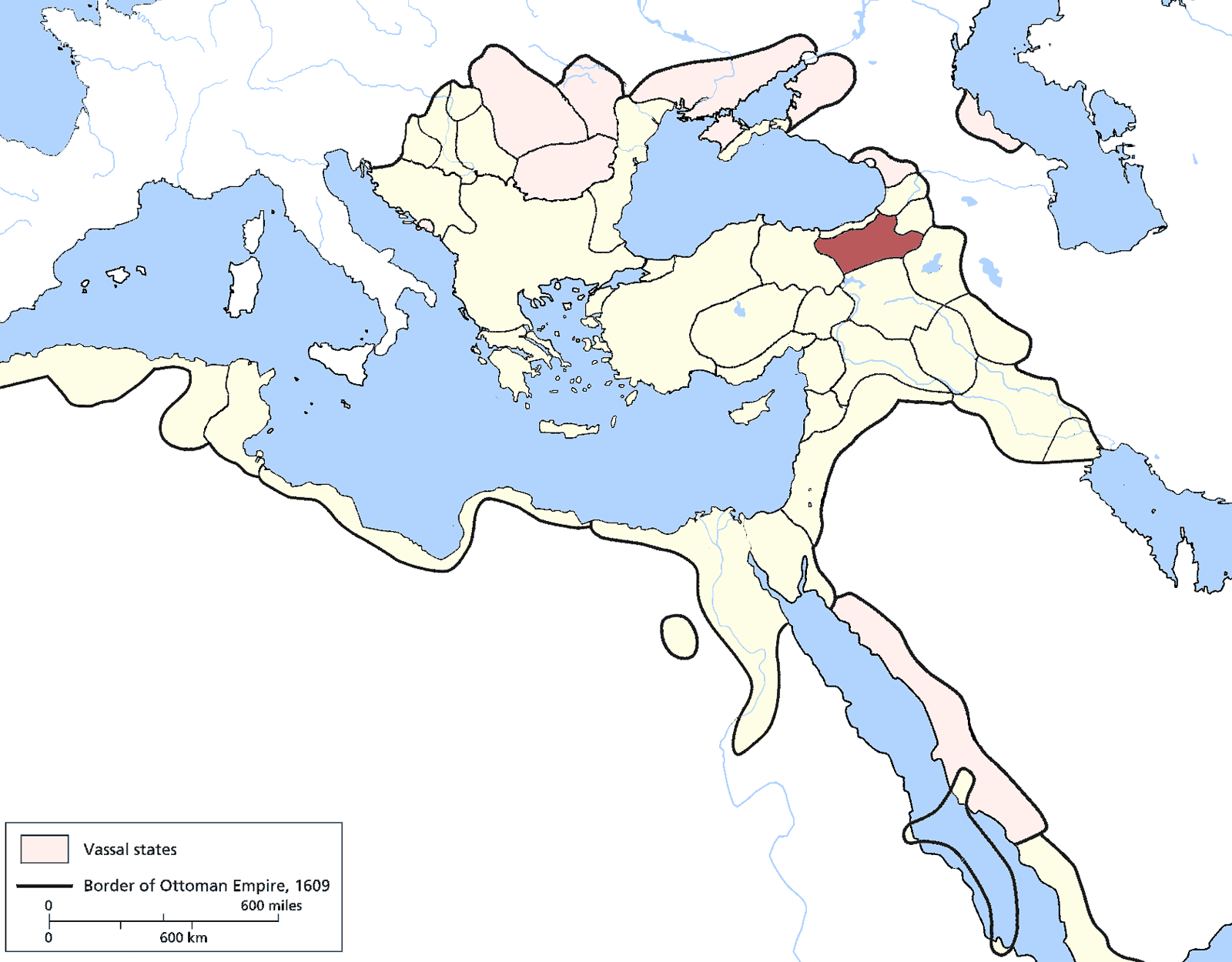
- The Erzurum Eyalet in 1609
- Capital: Erzurum
- History
  - Established: 1533
  - Disestablished: 1867
| Preceded by | Succeeded by |
| Safavid Empire | Erzurum Vilayet; Trebizond Eyalet |
- Today part of: Turkey

The Erzurum Eyalet (Ottoman Turkish: ایالت ارضروم, romanized: Eyālet-i Erżurūm) was an eyalet of the Ottoman Empire. It was established after the conquest of Western Armenia by the Ottoman Empire. Its reported area in the 19th century was 11,463 square miles (29,690 km^{2}).

== History ==
The eyalet was established in 1533. Early in the 17th century, the eyalet was threatened by Iran and the revolt by the province governor Abaza Mehmed Pasha. This revolt was combined with Jelali Revolts (the uprising of the provincial musketeers called the Celali), backed by Iran and lasting until 1628.

It was one of the first Ottoman provinces to become a vilayet after an administrative reform in 1865, and by 1867 it had been reformed into the Erzurum Vilayet.

== Governors ==
- Köprülü Fazıl Ahmed (1659–1660)

== Administrative divisions ==
Sanjaks of Erzurum Eyalet in the 17th century:

1. Sanjak of Kara-hisar (Şebinkarahisar)
2. Sanjak of Keifi (Kiğı, Akiı)
3. Sanjak of Pasin
4. Sanjak of Ispir
5. Sanjak of Khanis (Hınıs)
6. Sanjak of Malazgir
7. Sanjak of Tekman
8. Sanjak of Kuzudjan (Pülümür)
9. Sanjak of Turtum
10. Sanjak of Lejengerd (Mijingerd, Mujtekerd, İnkaya)
11. Sanjak of Mamar (Mamahar, Karababa)
12. Sanjak of Erzerum, the seat of the Pasha

Sanjaks between 1682 and 1702

1. Sanjak of Erzurum
2. Sanjak of Karahisar-ı Şarkî
3. Sanjak of Pasin
4. Sanjak of Hınıs
5. Sanjak of Malazgird
6. Sanjak of Tortum
7. Sanjak of Micingerd
8. Sanjak of Kuzcan
9. Sanjak of Bayburd
10. Sanjak of Kiğı
11. Sanjak of İsbir
12. Sanjak of Mamervan
13. Sanjak of Bayezid Kalesi
14. Sanjak of Eleşkird
15. Sanjak of Tekmân
16. Sanjak of Şelve (Tutak-Hamur)
17. Sanjak of Köy

Sanjaks in the early 19th century:

1. Sanjak of Erzerum
2. Sanjak of Kamakh (Kemah)
3. Sanjak of Maden
4. Sanjak of Erzincan
5. Sanjak of Şebinkarahisar
6. Sanjak of Gümüşhane
