= Metochion =

Ecclesiastical embassy church of the Eastern Orthodox tradition

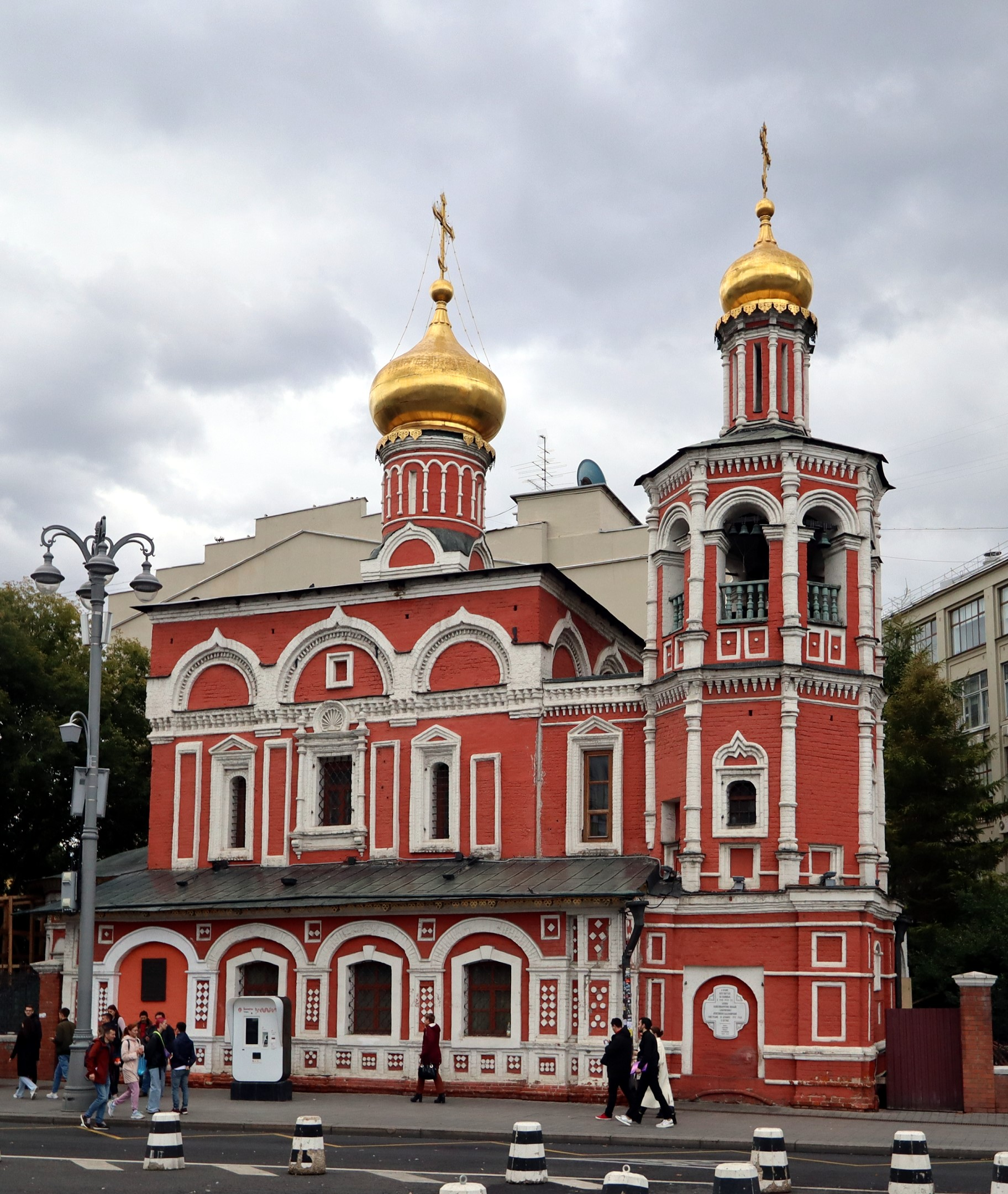
Former metochion of the Eastern Orthodox Church of Alexandria in the Church of All Saints, Moscow

A metochion or metochi (Greek: μετόχιον, romanized: metóchion or μετόχι, metóchi; Russian: подворье, romanized: podvorie or метох, metoh) is an ecclesiastical embassy church within Eastern Orthodox tradition. It is usually from one autocephalous or autonomous church to another. The term is also used to refer to a parish representation (or dependency) of a monastery or a primate.

== Ecclesiastical embassy church ==
In the former case, the local territorial church grants a plot of land or a church building for the use of the foreign church being represented, and the location is then considered to belong canonically to the foreign church. Services held there are often in the language appropriate to the church being represented, and the congregation is often made up of immigrants or visitors from the nation associated with that church. Typically, a metochion presence on the territory of an autocephalous church is limited to only a few parishes at most.

== Dependency of a monastery ==
In the case of a monastic metochion, such a parish church is a dependency of a particular monastic community, perhaps receiving clergy from that community or other forms of support. During the Byzantine era, a monastic metochion may have been property granted to a monastery for income purposes.

Metochion is currently employed, as well, to refer to a dependent monastery, skete, kellion (cell) or monastic society that is being given the blessing and support to develop into an autonomous monastery, skete, kellion or society. For an example, Wawasinno Ki'chi Wa Mali'i Waabanowigaan—the Hesychastic Society of the Most Holy Mary—is a Canadian Orthodox hesychastic society founded for (but not to be exclusively of) Aboriginal Orthodox, and which is classified as a metochion of the Monastic Society of St. Silouan the Athonite (OCA, Archdiocese of Canada). (Note: "On 22 March 2009, the Archbishop (Seraphim (Storheim) of Ottawa) blessed the establishment of the Hesychastic Society of the Most Holy Mary (an aboriginal brotherhood), as part of the Monastic Community of St Silouan the Athonite." (CANADIAN ORTHODOX MESSENGER. Summer/Ité 2009. p.18.))

== See also ==
- Metohija, which takes its name from this form of monastery.

== Sources ==
- Živković, Tibor; Bojanin, Stanoje; Petrović, Vladeta, eds. (2000). Selected Charters of Serbian Rulers (XII-XV Century): Relating to the Territory of Kosovo and Metohia. Athens: Center for Studies of Byzantine Civilisation. ISBN 9788683303014.
- Fotić, Aleksandar (2007). "The Metochion of the Chilandar Monastery in Salonica (Sixteenth-Seventeenth Centuries)". The Ottoman Empire, the Balkans, the Greek Lands: Toward a Social and Economic History. Istanbul: The Isis Press. pp. 109–114. doi:10.31826/9781463225544-010. ISBN 978-1-4632-2554-4. Archived from the original on 2024-12-26.
- Fotić, Aleksandar (2019). "Coping with Extortion on a Local Level: The Case of Hilandarʹs Metochion in Zdravikion (Draviskos, Strymon Region) in the Sixteenth Century" (PDF). Балканика. 50: 73–83. Archived from the original (PDF) on 2021-12-12.
- Fotić, Aleksandar (2021). "How to Run a Big Monastic Çiftlik: The Case of Hilandar's ʻBulgar Metochionʼ in Karviya (Kalamaria): Sixteenth-Seventeenth Centuries". Monastic Economy across Time: Wealth Management, Patterns, and Trends. Sofia: Centre for Advanced Study. pp. 83–97.
