= Sarıkamış =

- Municipality
- Location within Turkey
- Coordinates: 40°20′17″N 42°34′23″E
- Country: Turkey
- Province: Kars
- District: Sarıkamış

Government
  - Mayor: Harun Hayali (MHP)
- Elevation: 2,100 m (6,900 ft)
- Population (2022): 15,260
- Time zone: UTC+3 (TRT)
- Postal code: 36500
- Area code: 0474
- Website: www.sarikamis.bel.tr

Sarıkamış or Sarikamish (Kurdish: Zerqamîş, Armenian: Սարիղամիշ, romanized: Sariġamiš) is a town in Kars Province in the Eastern Anatolia region of Turkey. It is the seat of Sarıkamış District. Its population is 15,260 (2022).

The town is perhaps best known for being the site of the Battle of Sarikamish, one of the major battles of the Caucasus front of World War I.

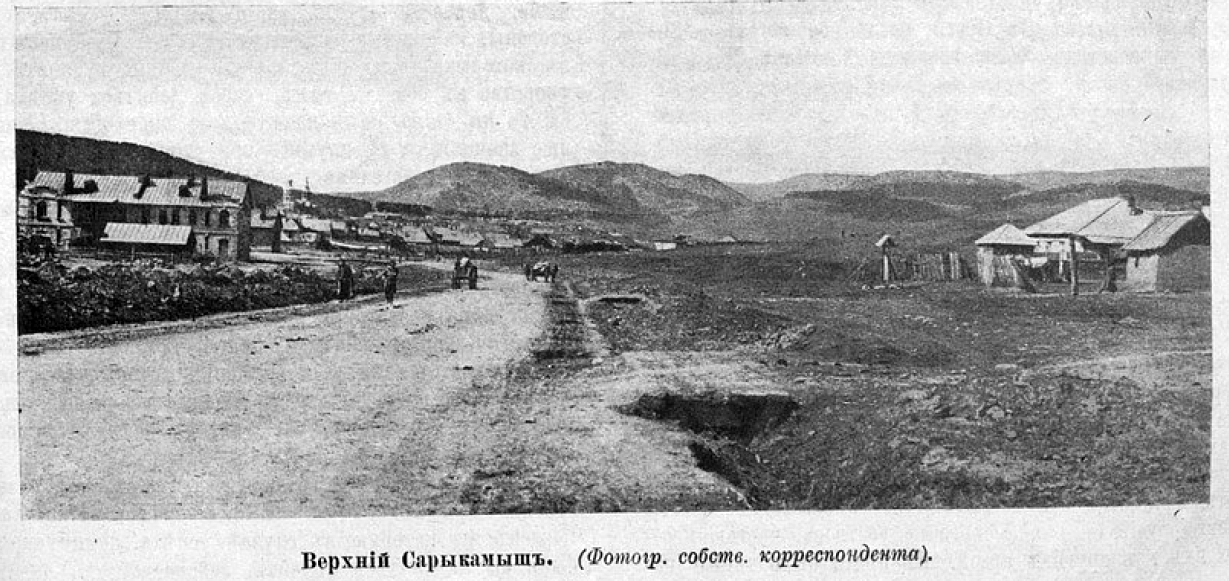
Upper Sarikamish in March 1916

== History ==
For most of the 19th century, Sarikamish was an insignificant settlement that was divided into two parts: upper Sarikamish and lower Sarikamish.

Obsidian from Sarikamish was found at several Neolithic sites in South Caucasus, such as at Aratashen, and at Khramis Didi-gora dating from the 6th millennium BC. Obsidian from Meydan Dağ (to the south of Sarikamish) was also found in South Caucasus.

During the later history, nearby archaeological sites date from Urartian times: there is a Urartian fortress on a hill beside upper Sarikamish, another, 12 km (7.5 mi) away, beside Chatak village, and a third, 15 km (9.3 mi) away, at a site known as Yedikilise. In 1878, archaeologist Alexander Yeritsian discovered near Sarıkamış a cuneiform inscription made during the reign of Urartian king Argishti I. To the east and south of the town, in the forests of Soğanlı, there were many medieval Armenian monasteries, but most were in ruins by 1878.

Seljuk sultan Alp Arslan invaded the Sarikamish area including Allahüekber and Soğanlı mountains in 1064, only a few years prior to the battle of Manzikert between the armies of Alp Arslan and Byzantines. The area was then taken by Selim I in 1514 and became a liva of Kars sancak of the Ottoman Empire.

In the 19th century, the region around Sarikamish became a conflict zone between the Ottoman and Russian empires. Battles took place at nearby Zivin in 1829, 1855 and 1877.

After the Russo-Turkish War of 1877–1878, Sarikamish became part of the Russian empire, incorporated within the militarily administered Kars Oblast, which was renowned for the extreme ethnic diversity of its population. Lower Sarikamish developed into a small, modern town. Being close to the Ottoman border, it was also a military station with barracks for two regiments. It had a railway station that was the railhead for the line running from Kars and Alexandropol.

=== Battle of Sarikamish ===
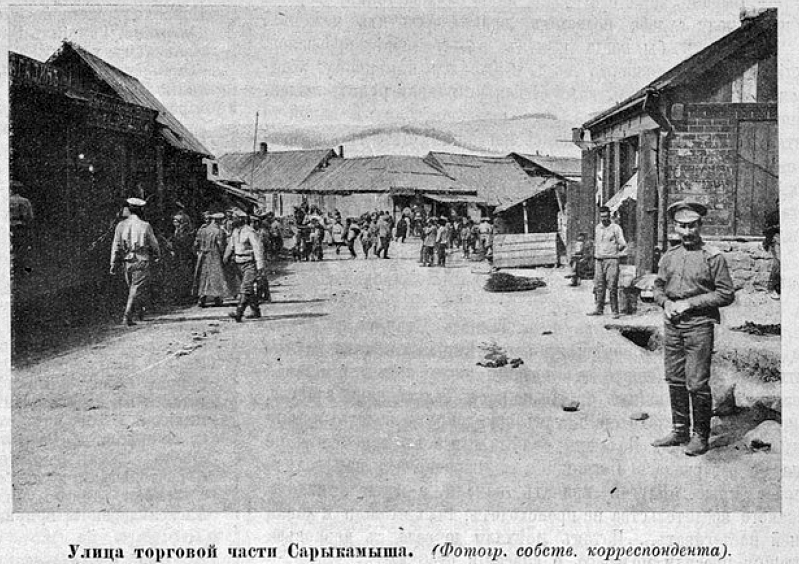
Sarikamish market in March 1916

An important battle took place between the armies of the Ottoman and Russian empires in and around the city in late December 1914-January 1915 as part of the Caucasus Campaign of World War I.

Enver Pasha, the leader of the Ittihat ve Terakki party in Istanbul, personally led the army along with Hafiz Hakki Pasha, who was his brother in-law, to scale the Mount Allahu Ekber and afterwards attack the Russian army in Sarikamish. Enver Pasha intended to occupy the town in order to halt logistic support to the city of Kars, which the Turks lost to the Russians in 1878, and which he was planning to reoccupy.

In mid December, Enver Pasha entered the Caucasus region through Armenia. Enver ordered his forces to attack along many routes with the goal of arriving suddenly at Sarikamis at the same time. The chief German military advisor, Liman von Sanders strongly argued against this plan but was ignored. Governor General Vorontsov planned to withdraw his forces to the city of Kars. But General Yudenich, in charge of the defense of the area, ignored Vorontsov's wishes to withdraw and instead stayed to defend Sarikamis.

Enver's forces lost touch with one another and arrived at Sarakamis at different times from December 29 through 3 January. The first divisions to arrive briefly took control of the barracks in the western part of the city but were driven off. In the following days, as more Ottoman forces arrived at the battle, they attacked without coordination and the Russians under the skillful command of Yudenich fought off the attacks one by one. The battle finally ended on January 4 and the Ottoman army retreated in complete disorganization back through the mountains in the middle of winter.

The number of Turkish losses is estimated to be 60,000-80,000 dead out of an army of 90,000. It is very likely that the majority of Turkish soldiers died because of inadequate winter clothing and field shelters during the attack and retreat. In any event, this was an extraordinarily costly defeat for the Turks; in losses this was the worst single defeat they suffered in the entire war. Turkish soldiers reached their targets but they were too weak to win. The Russian casualties were estimated at 35,000.

As one German officer attached to the army wrote later, the Ottoman 3rd army had "suffered a disaster which for rapidity and completeness is without parallel in military history."

== Climate ==
Sarıkamış has a humid continental climate (Köppen: Dfb), with cool summers and very cold winters.

Climate data for Sarıkamış (1991–2020)
Month	Jan	Feb	Mar	Apr	May	Jun	Jul	Aug	Sep	Oct	Nov	Dec	Year
Mean daily maximum °C (°F)	−2.7 (27.1)	−1.5 (29.3)	2.8 (37.0)	9.3 (48.7)	14.6 (58.3)	19.6 (67.3)	23.5 (74.3)	24.8 (76.6)	20.7 (69.3)	13.6 (56.5)	5.5 (41.9)	−0.4 (31.3)	10.9 (51.6)
Daily mean °C (°F)	−7.9 (17.8)	−6.9 (19.6)	−2.3 (27.9)	3.6 (38.5)	8.3 (46.9)	12.7 (54.9)	16.2 (61.2)	16.6 (61.9)	12.4 (54.3)	6.5 (43.7)	−0.4 (31.3)	−5.6 (21.9)	4.5 (40.1)
Mean daily minimum °C (°F)	−12.6 (9.3)	−11.8 (10.8)	−7.0 (19.4)	−1.4 (29.5)	2.7 (36.9)	5.9 (42.6)	9.1 (48.4)	9.1 (48.4)	4.8 (40.6)	0.6 (33.1)	−5.0 (23.0)	−10.0 (14.0)	−1.2 (29.8)
Average precipitation mm (inches)	33.45 (1.32)	32.45 (1.28)	51.08 (2.01)	73.03 (2.88)	83.88 (3.30)	60.87 (2.40)	44.68 (1.76)	31.97 (1.26)	22.84 (0.90)	48.93 (1.93)	36.15 (1.42)	34.1 (1.34)	553.43 (21.79)
Average precipitation days (≥ 1.0 mm)	6.4	7.3	7.8	11.2	13.3	10.2	7.5	6.5	4.6	7.8	5.8	7.4	95.8
Average relative humidity (%)	76.4	75.8	74.2	70.9	70.0	66.5	66.6	62.5	61.1	70.4	73.4	76.8	70.3
Source: NOAA

== See also ==
- Soğuksu Nature Park, a 2011-established nature park 3 km (1.9 mi) southeast of Sarıkamış.
