= List of populated places in Ardahan Province =

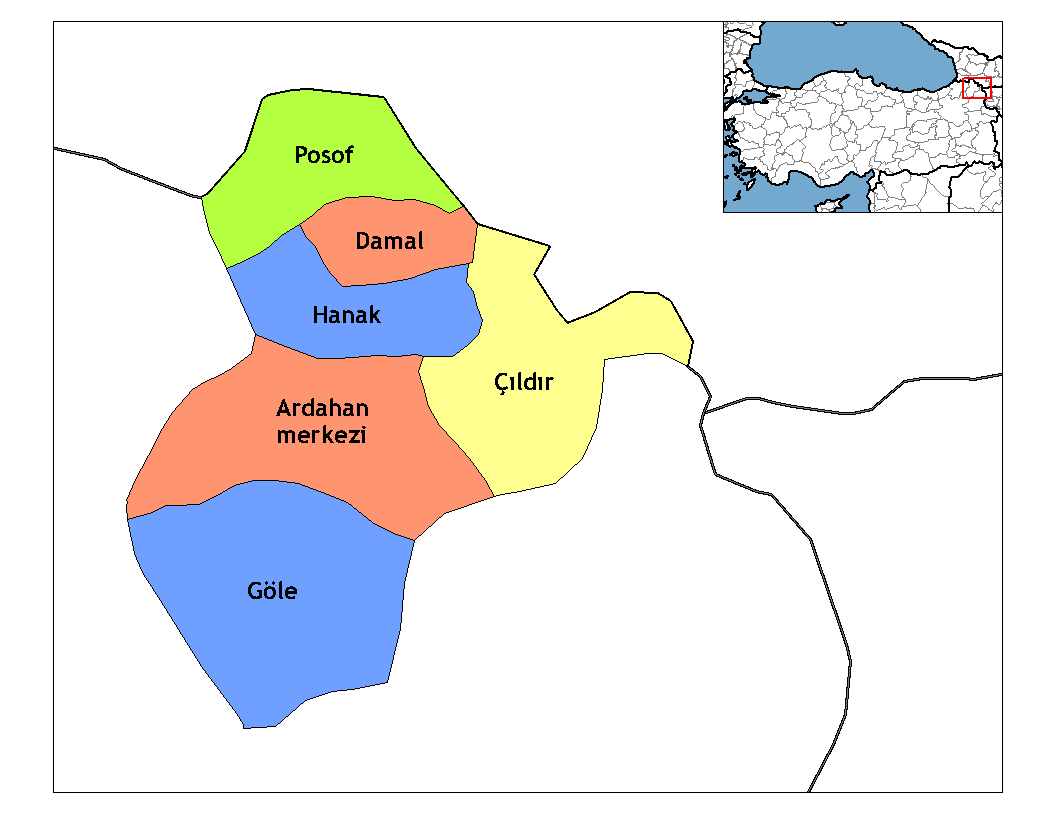
Ardahan Province

Below is the list of populated places in Ardahan Province, Turkey by districts. In the following lists, first place in each list is the administrative center of the district.

== Ardahan ==
- Ardahan
- Açıkyazı, Ardahan
- Ağzıpek, Ardahan
- Akyaka, Ardahan
- Alagöz, Ardahan
- Altaş, Ardahan
- Ardıçdere, Ardahan
- Aşağıkurtoğlu, Ardahan
- Bağdaşen, Ardahan
- Balıkçılar, Ardahan
- Bayramoğlu, Ardahan
- Beşiktaş, Ardahan
- Binbaşar, Ardahan
- Büyüksütlüce, Ardahan
- Çağlayık, Ardahan
- Çalabaş, Ardahan
- Çamlıçatak, Ardahan
- Çataldere, Ardahan
- Çatalköprü, Ardahan
- Çeğilli, Ardahan
- Çetinsu, Ardahan
- Çimenkaya, Ardahan
- Çobanlı, Ardahan
- Dağcı, Ardahan
- Dağevi, Ardahan
- Dedegül, Ardahan
- Değirmenli, Ardahan
- Derindere, Ardahan
- Edegül, Ardahan
- Gölgeli, Ardahan
- Gürçayır, Ardahan
- Güzçimeni, Ardahan
- Güzelyurt, Ardahan
- Hacıali, Ardahan
- Hasköy, Ardahan
- Höçvan, Ardahan
- Kartalpınar, Ardahan
- Kazlıköy, Ardahan
- Kıraç, Ardahan
- Kocaköy, Ardahan
- Köprücük, Ardahan
- Küçüksütlüce, Ardahan
- Lehimli, Ardahan
- Meşedibi, Ardahan
- Nebioğlu, Ardahan
- Ortageçit, Ardahan
- Otbiçen, Ardahan
- Ovapınar, Ardahan
- Ölçek, Ardahan
- Ömerağa, Ardahan
- Samanbeyli, Ardahan
- Sarıyamaç, Ardahan
- Sugöze, Ardahan
- Sulakyurt, Ardahan
- Taşlıdere, Ardahan
- Tazeköy, Ardahan
- Tepeler, Ardahan
- Tepesuyu, Ardahan
- Tunçoluk, Ardahan
- Uzunova, Ardahan
- Yanlızçam, Ardahan
- Yaylacık, Ardahan
- Yokuşdibi, Ardahan
- Yukarıkurtoğlu, Ardahan

== Çıldır ==
- Çıldır
- Ağıllı, Çıldır
- Akçakale, Çıldır
- Akçıl, Çıldır
- Akdarı, Çıldır
- Akkiraz, Çıldır
- Aşağıcambaz, Çıldır
- Aşıkşenlik, Çıldır
- Baltalı, Çıldır
- Başköy, Çıldır
- Damlıca, Çıldır
- Dirsekkaya, Çıldır
- Doğankaya, Çıldır
- Eskibeyrehatun, Çıldır
- Eşmepınar, Çıldır
- Gölbelen, Çıldır
- Gölebakan, Çıldır
- Güvenocak, Çıldır
- Karakale, Çıldır
- Kaşlıkaya, Çıldır
- Kayabeyi, Çıldır
- Kenarbel, Çıldır
- Kenardere, Çıldır
- Kotanlı, Çıldır
- Kurtkale, Çıldır
- Kuzukaya, Çıldır
- Meryemköy, Çıldır
- Öncül, Çıldır
- Övündü, Çıldır
- Sabaholdu, Çıldır
- Saymalı, Çıldır
- Sazlısu, Çıldır
- Semihaşakir, Çıldır
- Taşdeğirmen, Çıldır
- Yenibeyrehatun, Çıldır
- Yıldırımtepe, Çıldır
- Yukarıcambaz, Çıldır

== Damal ==
- Damal
- Burmadere, Damal
- Dereköy, Damal
- Eskikılıç, Damal
- İkizdere, Damal
- Otağlı, Damal
- Seyitören, Damal
- Tepeköy, Damal

== Göle ==
- Göle
- Arpaşen, Göle
- Balçeşme, Göle
- Bellitepe, Göle
- Budaklı, Göle
- Büyükaltınbulak, Göle
- Çakıldere, Göle
- Çakırüzüm, Göle
- Çalıdere, Göle
- Çardaklı, Göle
- Çayırbaşı, Göle
- Çobanköy, Göle
- Çullu, Göle
- Damlasu, Göle
- Dedekılıcı, Göle
- Dengeli, Göle
- Dereyolu, Göle
- Dölekçayır, Göle
- Durucasu, Göle
- Esenboğaz, Göle
- Esenyayla, Göle
- Eskidemirkapı, Göle
- Filizli, Göle
- Gedik, Göle
- Gülistan, Göle
- Günorta
- Hoşdülbent, Göle
- Kalecik, Göle
- Karlıyazı, Göle
- Kayaaltı, Göle
- Koyunlu, Göle
- Köprülü, Göle
- Kuytuca, Göle
- Kuzupınarı, Göle
- Küçükaltınbulak, Göle
- Mollahasan, Göle
- Okçu, Göle
- Samandöken, Göle
- Senemoğlu, Göle
- Serinçayır, Göle
- Sürügüden, Göle
- Tahtakıran, Göle
- Tellioğlu, Göle
- Toptaş, Göle *Uğurtaşı, Göle
- Yağmuroğlu, Göle
- Yanatlı, Göle
- Yavuzlar, Göle *Yeleçli, Göle
- Yenidemirkapı, Göle
- Yeniköy, Göle
- Yiğitkonağı, Göle

== Hanak ==
- Hanak
- Altınemek, Hanak
- Aşağıaydere, Hanak
- Baştoklu, Hanak
- Binbaşak, Hanak
- Börk, Hanak
- Çatköy, Hanak
- Çavdarlı, Hanak
- Çayağzı, Hanak
- Çiçeklidağ, Hanak
- Çimliçayır, Hanak
- Güneşgören, Hanak
- İncedere, Hanak
- Karakale, Hanak
- Koyunpınarı, Hanak
- Sazlıçayır, Hanak
- Serinkuyu, Hanak
- Sevimli, Hanak
- Sulakçayır, Hanak
- Yamaçyolu, Hanak
- Yamçılı, Hanak
- Yukarıaydere, Hanak
- Yünbüken, Hanak

== Posof ==
- Posof
- Akballı, Posof
- Alabalık, Posof
- Alköy, Posof
- Arılı, Posof
- Armutveren, Posof
- Asmakonak, Posof
- Aşıküzeyir, Posof
- Aşıkzülali, Posof
- Balgözü, Posof
- Baykent, Posof
- Binbaşıeminbey, Posof
- Çakırkoç, Posof
- Çambeli, Posof
- Çamyazı, Posof
- Çayırçimen, Posof
- Demirdöver, Posof
- Derindere, Posof
- Doğrular, Posof
- Erim, Posof
- Gönülaçan, Posof
- Gümüşkavak, Posof
- Günbatan, Posof
- Günlüce, Posof
- Gürarmut, Posof
- İncedere, Posof
- Kaleönü, Posof
- Kalkankaya, Posof
- Kayınlı, Posof
- Kırköy, Posof
- Kolköy, Posof
- Kopuzlu, Posof
- Kumlukoz, Posof
- Kurşunçavuş, Posof
- Özbaşı, Posof
- Sarıçiçek, Posof
- Sarıdarı, Posof
- Savaşır, Posof
- Söğütlükaya, Posof
- Süngülü, Posof
- Sütoluk, Posof
- Taşkıran, Posof
- Türgözü, Posof
- Uğurca, Posof
- Uluçam, Posof
- Yaylaaltı, Posof
- Yeniköy, Posof
- Yolağzı, Posof
- Yurtbaşı, Posof
- Yurtbekler, Posof
