= Meidani, Ardahan =

Former village in Turkey

Meidani (Georgian: მეიდანი) was one of the villages in the historical Artani region. Although the exact location of this now-vanished village cannot be determined, it is situated in the central district of Ardahan Province in Turkey.

== History ==
Meidani (მეიდანი) is a word that entered Georgian from Arabic and means ‘square’. This word is used today as ‘moedani’ (მოედანი). Meidani village was recorded as ‘Meydan’ (میدان) in the Ottoman land-survey register (mufassal defter) dated 1595.

The historical Artani region, where the village of Meidani is located, was one of the places that made up Georgia in the Middle Ages. Indeed, the Ottomans seized this region and the village from the Georgians in the mid-16th century.

Meidani village was listed in the 1595 Ottoman land-survey register (mufassal defter) as being within the Georgia Province (Gürcistan Vilayeti), attached to the Kuzey district (nahiye) of the Ardahan-i Büzürg province (liva). Its population consisted of 5 Christian households, and the heads of these households bore Georgian names. The village practised wheat and barley farming and beekeeping, and raised sheep and pigs.

Meidani village was also recorded as ‘Meydan’ (میدان) in the Ottoman cebe defter covering the period 1694-1732 in the Çıldır Eyalet. In 1108 AH (1696/1697) and 1134 AH (1721/1722), it was affiliated with the Southern district of the Ardahan-i Büzürg province. In 1134 AH (1721/1722), Meidani village was attached to the Ardanuç district (nahiye) of the Ardanuç province (liva), and in 1143 AH (1730/1731), it retained the same administrative status. The village's revenue ranged between 4,000 and 875 akçe.

Meidani village was recorded in the 1595 Ottoman detailed register between the villages of Kindzotamali (Bağdaşen) and Shadevani ( Çatalköprü). The fact that the name Meidani does not appear in the 1886 Russian census for the Ardahan district (uchastok) of the Ardahan Okrug indicates that this settlement ceased to be a village before that date.
