= Hozan Dîno =

Kurdish musical artist

- Born: Yusuf Şahin; 1969 (age 56–57); Hasköy, Ardahan, Turkey
- Origin: Kurds
- Genres: Kurdish music
- Occupation: Artist
- Label: Kom Muzîk (then) Deutsch-Kurdisches Kulturinstitut (then) Hozan Dîno (Şirket) (now)

Dîno, also known as Hozan Dîno or by his real name Yusuf Şahin (born 1969), is a Kurdish artist best known for writing songs in Kurmanji. His most popular song is Kurdish: Oy Yarê, which has remained well-known since its release.

== Biography ==
Dîno, born in 1969 in the Kurdish village of Xewiskar (Köprücük) in Ardahan Province, began his education in Hasköy, Ardahan. He excelled academically and continued his studies in Gümüşhane and later in Istanbul. However, due to personal reasons, he had to quit his studies in his final year.

He first participated in musical activities through the Mesopotamian Cultural Center but had to pause his music due to financial difficulties. In the 1990s, during the Kurdish conflict, Dîno and his family were affected, and in 1995, he was detained for "supporting a prohibited organization."

Following his release, he left Turkey in 1998, seeking asylum in the Netherlands. He lived in a refugee camp for about four years before receiving citizenship and during this period, he resumed his music career.

== Music ==
Hozan Dîno's first album, Le Daye, gained popularity with its title track becoming a hit. Dîno writes all of his music and lyrics, with the distinctive feature of his albums being that both the lyrics and music are entirely his own. His unique voice has made him a well-recognised figure in Kurdish music.

Dîno describes his artistic approach as follows:

I try to be the artist of the people whose love and liberties have been stolen, whose hopes have been pushed back, whose happiness has not been revived and who, as a lesson to humanity, is still on foot.

— Hozan Dîno

== Discography ==
=== Studio albums ===
- Lê Dayê (2002)
- Çû (2005)
- Namûs (2007)
- Dîsa Çu (2011)
- Roj (2020)

== Filmography ==
=== Clip ===
- Le Daye (2001)
- Ez Zarokek Benavim (2005)
- Çû (2005)
- Oy Yarê (2009)
- Be Te Nabe (2011)
- Were Gulê (2015)
- Emir Kuda Cu (2020)
- Tenahi (2023)
- Veger (2024)
