= Tetritsikhe =

Tetritsikhe (Georgian: თეთრი ციხე) was a village that had disappeared in the historical Erusheti region. This settlement was located within the borders of Dilekdere (Hoshureti) village in the Hanak district of Ardahan Province in Turkey.

== History ==
Tetritsikhe (თეთრი ციხე) is composed of the Georgian words "tetri" (თეთრი), meaning white, and "tsihe" (ციხე), meaning fortress. This place name means "White Castle". Tetritsikhe was recorded as "Aghja Kala" (اغجە قلعە) in the Ottoman land-survey register (mufassal defter) of 1595. Georgian Turkologist Sergi Jikia wrote that this place name, like Akçakale in the Çıldır district, may have been translated from Georgian into Turkish.

The Erusheti region, where the village of Tetritsikhe or Aghja Kala is located, was part of historical Georgia. Indeed, the Ottomans captured this region and the village from the Georgians in the mid-16th century. The known old church must also date from that period.

Tetritsikhe or Aghja Kala is recorded in the Ottoman land-survey register (mufassal defter) of 1595 as a village within the Meshe district (nahiye) of the Ardahan-i Büzürg Liva of the Vilayet-i Gürcistan. By this time, the settlement had been completely depopulated. Despite this, a tax of 8,499 akçe was stipulated.

The village of Tetritsikhe, or Aghja Kala, was recorded as Aghja Kala (اغجە قلعە) in the Ottoman cebe defter of Çıldır Province (Eyalet-i Çıldır), covering the period 1694-1732. The village, which occupied the same administrative position, was allocated to a man named Süleyman in exchange for a tax of 2,500 akçe in 1137 AH (1724/1725) and to a man named Ahmed in exchange for a similar tax in 1140 AH (1727/1728).

Georgian Turkologist Sergi Jikia, who published the Ottoman mufassal defter, wrote that the village's name appeared on a late Russian map as "Agjakala" (Агджакала), with Harosmani marked at the top. However, the 1886 Russian census did not include this village in the Ardahan district (uchastok) of the Ardahan Okrug. This record indicates that the village of Tetritsihe, or Aghja Kala, had completely disappeared before this date. Indeed, in 1917, Georgian journalist and historian Konstantine Martvileli wrote that the village was abandoned and that the ruins of an old church were found there. It is also understood from Martvileli's information that Tetritsikhe was located somewhere between the villages of Dilekdere and Sevimli.
