= Edegül, Ardahan =

Edegül
- Village
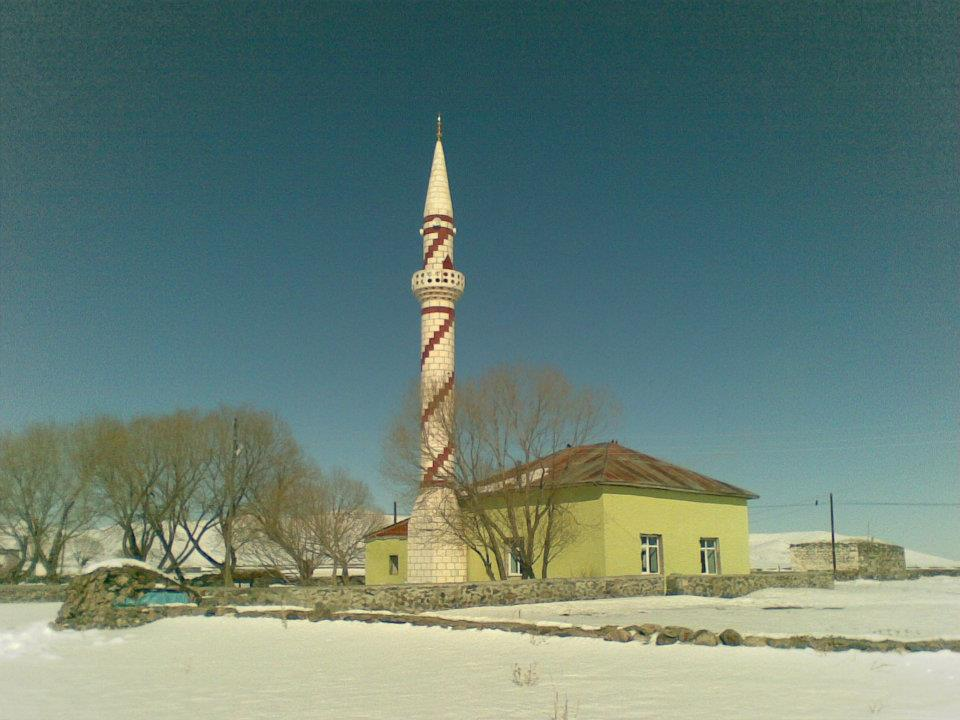
- A picture from Edegül village

- Location within Turkey
- Coordinates: 41°07′00″N 42°35′10″E
- Country: Turkey
- Province: Ardahan
- District: Ardahan
- Population (2021): 87
- Time zone: UTC+3 (TRT)

Edegül is a village in the Ardahan District, Ardahan Province, Turkey. Its population is 87 (2021).

== History ==
It is unknown when the village of Edegül was established. The known names of the village thus far are Adagül and Edegül. The name of the village was first recorded in an Ottoman cadastral record book dated 1595 as "Adagül (اداكول)". The name Adagül (اداكول) has changed into Edegül (ۀدەكول) over time. In the middle of the 16th century, Edegül along with the Akhalsithe region, was taken from the Principality of Samtskhe by the Ottoman Empire under the treaty of Amasya with Safavid Empire. Thereafter, Edegül was connected to the Southern sub-district of Ardahan-i Büzürg liva in Childir Eyalet of the Ottoman Empire.

After staying under the Ottoman rule for more than three centuries, Edegül, along with the Kars province, was taken by Russian Empire after the Russo-Turkish War (1877–1878). Under the Russian administration, Edegül, which was recorded in the name of Adagül (Адагюль), was connected to the Ardahan okrug of the Kars Oblast. According to the Russian census of 1886, there were 59 people in the village at that time. After the First World War, the Moscow Treaty was signed between Government of the Grand National Assembly and Russia on March 16, 1921 and the Kars oblast, along with Edegül village, was ceded to Turkey. In an Ottoman Empire village list dated 1928, the name of the village was recorded as "Edegül" and it was connected to the Yalnızçam subdistrict of Ardahan district of Kars province. When Ardahan became a province in 1992, Edegül became the village of the central district of this province.

In 1950, Edegül had 353 population.
