= Shuaeklesia =

Shuaeklesia (Georgian: შუაეკლესია) is a vanished village in the historical Artani region in Turkey. Its settlement is located within the boundaries of Açıkyazı village, in the central district of Ardahan Province.

== History ==
Shuaeklesia (შუაეკლესია) is a Georgian place name meaning "middle church". In the 1595 Ottoman land-survey register (mufassal defter), it appears as Shuay Kilisa (شوای كلیسا). In this spelling, the word "shua" or "shuay" (შუაჲ), meaning "middle," is preserved, while "eklesia" is written as "kilisa."

Artani, where the village of Shuaeklesia is located, was one of the regions that formed Georgia in the Middle Ages. Indeed, the Ottomans captured this region from the Georgians in the 16th century, following the Georgian campaign of 1549.

In the Ottoman tax register of 1595, the village of Shuaeklesia was included in the Güney district of the Ardahan-i Büzürg liva. Its population consisted of 38 Christian households, and the heads of the households bore Georgian names. Wheat and barley were cultivated in the village, along with beekeeping and raising sheep and pigs. It had two water mills.

Shuaeklesia is also listed as Shuay Kilisa (شوای كلیسا) in the Ottoman cebe register of Çıldır Province, covering the period 1694-1732. The village, which held the same administrative position at that time, had a revenue of 6,000 akçe in 1116 AH (1704-1705), and was assigned to a man named Ismail.

According to the information given by the Georgian Turkologist Sergi Jikia, who published the Ottoman detailed ledger, the name of the village was marked on the Russian map in the late period as Shuakilisa (Шуакилиса) near the village of Alabala. However, the fact that its name was not mentioned in the Ardahan district of the Ardahan okrug in the Russian census of 1886 shows that this settlement ceased to be a village before this date.
