= Balvana =

Balvana (Georgian: ბალვანა) is an ancient settlement that disappeared from the historical region of Erusheti in old Georgia. The remains of this settlement are spread over a large area within the boundaries of Yamaçyolu, formerly known as Vardosani, which is now part of the Hanak District of Ardahan Province in Turkey.

== History ==
Balvana (Georgian: ბალვანა) is a Georgian place name derived from the word ‘bali’ (ბალი), meaning ‘cherry’. It refers to a place where cherries grow. The former name of the village of Kirazlı, which is part of the district of Şavşat, is also Balvana. The site of the Balvana is located within the borders of the historical Erusheti region, in a settlement formerly known as Küçük Vardosani (Little Vardosani). Erusheti was one of the regions that formed Georgia in the Middle Ages. Indeed, the Ottomans seized this region from the Georgians in the second half of the 16th century. It is possible that the settlement recorded as ‘Lalvana’ (لالوانۀ) in the Ottoman land-survey register (mufassal defter) of 1595 is Balvana. Indeed, the village of Lalvana and the village of Küçük Vardosani were affiliated with the Meşe district (nahiye) of the Ardahan-i Büzürg province (liva). The fact that Lalvana village was a Georgian settlement is understood from the fact that the heads of households obliged to pay the ispendje tax to the Ottomans bore Georgian names.

The Balvana ruins are located 2 kilometres south of the Yamaçyolu settlement centre. These ruins are spread over an area wider than one kilometre. Dozens of building ruins are found in this area. The walls of some structures were constructed by filling the spaces between parallel, flat stones with mud and rubble. In the central part of this ancient settlement, there is a large area enclosed by walls. It is thought that this area served a defensive purpose. The local people refer to these remains, belonging to an abandoned settlement, as ‘Balvana’.
