= Hanakia =

Hanakia may refer to:

- Haná (Haná region, Hanakia), an ethnographic region in Moravia, Czech Republic
- Chanákia (Hanákia), a village of Alpochori community in the municipal unit of Iardanos, Elis, Greece
- Al Henakiyah (Al Hunakiyah, Al Hanakiya, Al Hanakia), a city and governorate in Al Madinah Province, Saudi Arabia
- Hanakia, a fossil genus of vesper bats.

== See also ==
- Hanak
- Hanák
- Hanuka
- Hanukkah
