= İncedere =

İncedere can refer to:

- İncedere, Hanak
- İncedere, Kemah
- İncedere, Posof
- İncedere, Şiran
