= Tkistavi =

Vanished village in Artani region

Tkistavi (Georgian: ტყისთავი) is a vanished village in the historical Artani region. The settlement is located within the boundaries of Dağevi (old Georgian name Tebati) village, a district of the central district of Ardahan Province in Turkey.

== History ==
The Georgian place name Tkistavi (ტყისთავი) is composed of the words "tke" (ტყე), meaning forest, and "tavi" (თავი), meaning head. The village's name can be translated as "Forest Head."

The historical Artani region, where the village of Tkistavi is located, was one of the regions that formed Georgia in the Middle Ages. Indeed, the Ottomans captured this region and the village from the Georgians in the mid-16th century. The settlement of Tkistavi is located within the present-day borders of Dağevi village.

The village of Tkistavi is mentioned as Diğistav (دیغستاو) in the Ottoman land-survey register (mufassal defter) of 1595. The settlement, recorded as two villages named Diğistav-i Büzürg (Big Tkistavi) and Diğistavi-i Küçük (Small Tkistavi), was then part of the Güney district (nahiye) of the Ardahan-i Büzürg liva within Vilayet-i Gürcistan. By this time, the village of Little Tkistavi had been abandoned. Fourteen Christian households lived in the village of Big Tkistavi, and the heads of the households bore Georgian names. Wheat and barley were cultivated in the village, along with beekeeping and raising sheep and pigs.

Tkistavi held the same administrative status as a single settlement under the name Dighistav (دیغستاو) in the Ottoman cebe defter of Çıldır Eyalet, include the period 1694-1732. According to a record dated 1126 AH (1714-1715), the village was assigned to a person named Musa, and a tax of 6,500 akçe was assessed.

According to information provided by the Georgian Turkologist Sergi Jikia, who published the Ottoman land-survey register (mufassal defter), the register indicates that the villages of Big Tkistavi and Small Tkistavi were located near Tebati. However, while Tebati (Tebat) was listed as a village in the Şadevani sub-district of Ardahan district (uchastok) of Ardahan Okrug in the 1886 Russian census, Tkistavi was not. This record indicates that Tkistavi ceased to be a village before this date.
