= Hülya Avşar =

Turkish actress and singer (born 1963)

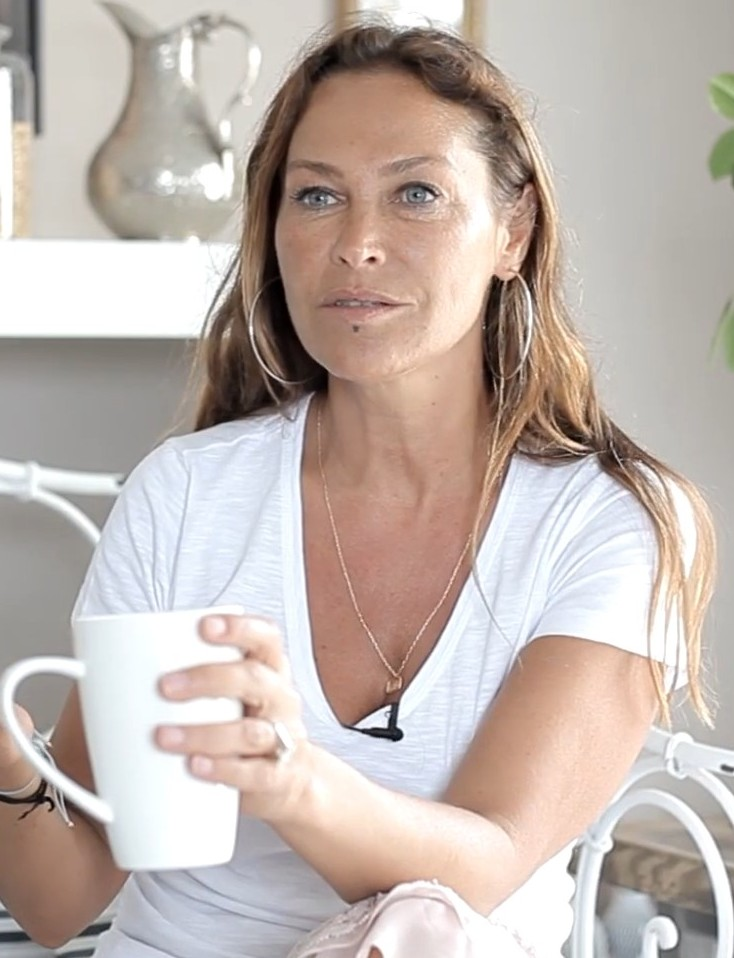
- Avşar in 2014
- Born: 10 October 1963 (age 62); Höçvan Hasköy, Ardahan, Turkey
- Occupations: Actress, singer, and businesswoman
- Years active: 1982–present
- Spouses: Mehmet Tecirli (m. 1979; div. 1981) Kaya Çilingiroğlu (m. 1997; div. 2005)
- Partner(s): Tanju Çolak (1987–1988); Sadettin Saran (2007–2010)
- Children: 1
- Awards: 1983 Turkey Beauty Pageant Winner (Beauty Queen); 1993 Moscow International Film Festival Best Actress Award Winner; 2000 Kral TV Best Female Singer Award Winner

Hülya Avşar (born 10 October 1963) is a Turkish-Kurdish actress, singer, businesswoman, and former beauty pageant titleholder. She is best known for appearing in the hit revenge series Kadın İsterse and numerous other films. Her international roles include Safiye Sultan in Muhteşem Yüzyıl: Kösem and Fatmagül in the movie Fatmagül'ün Suçu Ne?.

== Education and career ==
Avşar graduated from Ankara Cumhuriyet Lisesi and started swimming professionally for DSI. In 1982, she and her family moved to Istanbul. Avşar attended a beauty pageant organized by Bulvar magazine, which she finished first. Later, the organization revoked her crown when it was discovered that she had been married for a brief period. In 1983, she debuted as an actress in the movie Haram. In the following years, she starred in over 70 films and won the Best Actress prize in the 18th Moscow International Film Festival. In addition to this, she launched a singing career that saw a nationwide concert tour, the release of eight albums and two singles.

In 2000, Avşar won the Best Female Singer award by Kral TV. Later that same year, she wrote for Günaydın newspaper as a columnist. Avşar was also the editor of Hülya (a monthly magazine). She plays tennis on an amateur basis and won a championship in the TED 2001 tennis tournament. She is also a television personality who served as a coach and judge for the first two seasons of The Voice from 2011 through 2013.

Avşar also has been a judge on Turkey's Got Talent (Turkish: Yetenek Sizsiniz Türkiye) since 2009. Hülya Avşar was the editor-in-chief of the magazine Hülya, a position she has held for eight years. She is also the founder of the Turkish "by H" luxury brand, not to be confused with the similarly named New York-based clothing store.

== Personal life ==
Hülya Avşar was born in Hasköy, Ardahan, to a Kurdish father from Höçvan Hasköy, Ardahan, and a Turkish mother from Edremit. A part of her maternal family is of Ottoman Turkish descent who immigrated from Crete, Greece. The other part of her maternal family is of Yörük descent, which is a Turkic ethnic subgroup. In a television show she told that her father's Kurdish name is Ello, and her Kurdish birth name is Malakan. In 1979 Avşar married Mehmet Tecirli, an engineering student; however, they divorced shortly after. Avşar married for a second time in 1997 to Kaya Çilingiroğlu which ended in divorce in 2005; they have one daughter named Zehra. She has also dated former 1987–88 European Golden Shoe football player Tanju Çolak and businessman Sadettin Saran between 2007 and 2010.

== Discography ==
=== Studio albums ===
- Her Şey Gönlünce Olsun (13 June 1989)
- Hatırlar Mısın? (1 October 1990)
- Hülya Gibi (20 October 1991)
- Dost Musun Düşman Mı? (18 March 1993)
- Yarası Saklım (27 December 1995)
- Hayat Böyle (June 1998)
- Aşıklar Delidir (10 May 2002)
- Haute Couture / Kişiye Özel (October 2009)
- Aşk Büyükse (5 October 2013)

=== Singles ===
As lead artist

- Sevdim (April 2000)
- Geçmiş Olsun (August 2011)
- Güldür Yüzümü (from the album Baba Şarkılar, Vol. 2) (2018)
- Esmer (with Civan Haco) (2018)
- Saymadım Kaç Yıl Oldu (July 2019)
- Sen Aşk Mısın? (April 2022)
- Duydun Mu? (June 2022)
- Yapma Aşkım (August 2022)
- Anlatma (December 2022)
- Ahım Olsun (with Hakan Altun) (May 2025)

As featured artist

- Sen Olmazsan (with Rafet El Roman) (March 2017)

== Filmography ==
=== Films ===
| Year | Title | Role | Notes |
|---|---|---|---|
| 1983 | Haram | Hülya | |
| 1983 | Kahır | Pınar | |
| 1983 | Çelik Mezar | Gül | |
| 1984 | Karanfilli Naciye | Naciye | |
| 1984 | Tutku | Hacer | |
| 1984 | Ömrümün Tek Gecesi | Gülseren | |
| 1984 | Yabancı | Hülya | |
| 1984 | Kaptan | Melike | |
| 1984 | Güneş Doğarken | Nalan | |
| 1984 | Ayşem | Ayşe | |
| 1984 | Nefret | Hülya | |
| 1985 | Tele Kızlar | Çağla | |
| 1985 | Ölüm Yolu | Zeynep | |
| 1985 | Mavi Mavi | Sibel | |
| 1985 | Sekreter | Hülya | |
| 1985 | Tapılacak Kadın | Sabiha | |
| 1985 | Suçlu Gençlik | Neslihan | |
| 1985 | Paranın Esiri | Başak | |
| 1986 | Uzun Bir Gece | Gülsüm | |
| 1986 | Fatmagül'ün Suçu Ne? | Fatmagül | |
| 1986 | Dağlı Güvercin | Azize | |
| 1986 | Üç Halka 25 | Gülçiçek | |
| 1986 | Kısrak | Hülya | |
| 1986 | Aşk Hikayemiz | Sevda | |
| 1986 | Alın Yazım | Hülya | |
| 1986 | Sevda Ateşi | Maviş Gülcan | |
| 1986 | Mavi Melek | Billur Elif | |
| 1987 | Yarın Yarın | Şeyda | |
| 1987 | Bir Kırık Bebek | Gülizar | |
| 1987 | Çil Horoz | Ayten | |
| 1987 | Geri Dön | Gamze | |
| 1987 | Alamancının Karısı | Zeliha | |
| 1987 | Ziyaret | Arzu | |
| 1988 | Aşıksın | Deniz | |
| 1988 | Hülya | Hülya | |
| 1988 | Melodram | Esra | |
| 1989 | Öğretmen Zeynep | Zeynep | |
| 1989 | Fotoğraflar | Neslihan | |
| 1989 | Fazilet | Fazilet | |
| 1990 | Benim Sinemalarım | Nesibe | |
| 1993 | Hasan Boğuldu | Emine | |
| 1993 | Berlin in Berlin | Dilber | |
| 1995 | Bir Kadının Anatomisi | Sibel | |
| 1999 | Salkım Hanımın Taneleri | Nora | |
| 2002 | Yeşil Işık | Elif | |
| 2004 | Kalbin Zamanı | Belkıs | |
| 2005 | İki Genç Kız | Leman | |
| 2005 | Hababam Sınıfı Askerde | Zehra | |
| 2007 | Bir İhtimal Daha Var | Alev | |
| 2011 | 8 Ülke 8 Yönetmen ve Sinan | Hürrem Sultan | |
| 2011 | 72. Koğuş | Fatma | |
| 2018 | Selfi | Hülya | |

=== TV series ===
| Year | Title | Role | Notes |
|---|---|---|---|
| 1982 | İntibah | | |
| 1995 | Sevginin Gücü | | |
| 1996 | Süper Yıldız | | |
| 1999 | Ah Bir Zengin Olsam | | |
| 2001 | Savunma | | |
| 2004 | Zümrüt | | |
| 2004 | Kadın İsterse | | |
| 2006 | Kadın Severse | | |
| 2015–2016 | Muhteşem Yüzyıl: Kösem | Safiye Sultan | |
| 2021 | Masumiyet | Hale Ilgaz | |

== TV programs ==
- Çek Bakalım
- Alaturka Soloist
- Hülya Avşar Soruyor, Habertürk TV – (2009–2011)
- Hülya Avşar Show, TNT Show TV Kanal D TGRT – 1996–2011
- Hülya Avşar'la Sen Bilirsin, ATV – 2006
- Pişti, Show TV – 2006
- Hülya Avşar Stüdyosu, BeIN GURME
- Kadınlar ve Erkekler, ATV – 2007
- Yetenek Sizsiniz Türkiye, Show TV Star TV TV8 – 2009–2014, 2017–
- O Ses Türkiye, Show TV Star TV – 2011–2013
- Hülya Avşar, TV8 – 2014–2015
- Bir Hülya Avşar Sohbeti, Star TV – 2017–2018
- Hülya Avşar Show, YouTube – 2020
- Yıldız De Bana, Kanal D – 2023

Awards
Moscow International Film Festival
| Preceded by Isabelle Huppert for Madame Bovary | Best Actress for Berlin in Berlin; 1993 | Succeeded by Emmanuelle Béart for Une femme française |
