= Akyaka =

Akyaka may refer to several places:

- Akyaka, Ardahan, Turkey
- Akyaka, Bozdoğan, Turkey
- Akyaka, Burdur
- Akyaka, Demirözü, Turkey
- Akyaka, Kars, Turkey
  - Akyaka railway station, in Akyaka, Kars
- Akyaka, Muğla, Turkey
