= Hacıali =

Hacıali can refer to the following villages in Turkey:

- Hacıali, Ardahan
- Hacıali, Manavgat
- Hacıali, Taşköprü
- Hacıali, Yüreğir
- Hacıali, Zonguldak
