= Ovapınar =

Ovapınar can refer to:

- Ovapınar, Ardahan
- Ovapınar, Düzce
