= Almona =

Almona (Georgian: ალმონა) is a vanished village in the historical Artani region. The village's settlement is located within the boundaries of Yalnızçam (formerly Sindisgomi), in the central district of Ardahan Province.

== History ==
The Artani region, where the village of Almona is located, was within the borders of Georgia in the Middle Ages. Indeed, the Ottomans captured the region from the Georgians in the mid-16th century. The ruined structure built using drywall in the village's settlement area must also date from this period.

The village of Almona was recorded as Almona (المونە) in the Ottoman land-survey register (mufassal defter) of 1595. Located in the Kuzey district (nahiye) of Ardahan-i Büzürg (liva) within the Gürcistan Vilayeti (Georgian Province), the village had 32 Christian households, and most of the heads of households bore Georgian names. Almona cultivated wheat, barley, and rye, engaged in beekeeping, and raised pigs and sheep. It also had two watermills.

Almona village held the same administrative position in the Ottoman cebe defter of Çıldır Province (Çıldır Eyaleti), covering the period 1694-1732. In 1134 AH (1721/1722), the village's revenue was 12,000 akçe, and it was allocated to a person named Mehmed.

It is possible that the Sindisgomi Church, located immediately adjacent to the settlement area of Almona, was Almona's church. Although a land-survey register (mufassal defter) in 1595, the village's population gradually declined for unknown reasons, dropping to four households by 1878. It appears that the settlement was completely deserted shortly thereafter. Indeed, Almona was not listed as a village in the Ardahan district in the 1886 Russian census.

The ruins of an ancient structure in the village of Almona are located on a high hill on the right bank of the Kura River. This structure, likely a castle, has largely collapsed. Today, only the foundations of its walls remain visible. Inside the castle walls, a round structure remains relatively intact. This small structure is thought to be the castle's tower. It appears that the base of the tower was excavated by treasure hunters. This has revealed the tower's northern wall, which is approximately 1.5 meters high today.
