= Şiran =

Şiran Cheriana
- Municipality
- Coat of arms

- Location within Turkey
- Coordinates: 40°11′22″N 39°07′36″E
- Country: Turkey
- Province: Gümüşhane
- District: Şiran

Government
  - Mayor: Abdulbaki Kara (DP)
- Elevation: 1,457 m (4,780 ft)
- Population (2022): 11,539
- Time zone: UTC+3 (TRT)
- Area code: 0456
- Climate: Dsb
- Website: www.siran.bel.tr

Şiran (Pontic: Cheriana, Χεροιανά in greek) is a town in Gümüşhane Province in the Black Sea region of Turkey. It is the seat of Şiran District. Its population is 11,539 (2022). It is one of the points of passage between Eastern Anatolia and Black Sea regions of Turkey, in the sense that the western road departing from Erzincan towards the Zigana Pass (the key pass between the two geographies) has its last urban stop in Şiran. The town lies at an elevation of 1,457 m (4,780 ft)

== Climate ==
The region is under the influence of the Black Sea climate. However, the district, which is located in the valley formed by the Kelkit Stream, exhibits a landscape with less rainfall, harsh winters and mild summers compared to the Coastal Region due to its location in the interior.

== Culture ==
They have local dishes such as "Pestil, köme, kuymak, siron, evelik dolması, erişte pilavı, laz böreği, kete, lor dolması, su böreği, keşkek, sütlü aş, fırın pidesi, tandır ekmeği, kartol yahnisi, kaygana, pepeçura and pancar çorbası".

Folk dances in the region are accompanied by Drums-Zurna and Kemençe.

The folk game of the region is Horon dances played in the region: Sıksara, Dizden Kırma(Rum Diki), Düz Horon, Hey Mustafa, İki Ayak, Beş Ayak, Mavrengel, Tamzara, Bıçak Horonu, Temir Ağa, Sarıkız, Sürmene Sallaması, Koçari, Lazutlar, Sürmeli.

== Dialect ==
The speech of the region is close to the Eastern Blacksean dialect, but it is partially influenced by the Northeastern Anatolian dialect.

== See also ==
- İncedere
