= Taşlıdere =

Taşlıdere (literally "stony brook") is a Turkish place name that may refer to the following places in Turkey:

- Taşlıdere, Ardahan, a village in the district of Ardahan, Ardahan Province
- Taşlıdere, Bolvadin, a village in the district of Bolvadin, Afyonkarahisar Province
- Taşlıdere, Kozluk, a village in the district of Kozluk, Batman Province
