= Gürçayır =

Gürçayır can refer to:

- Gürçayır, Ardahan
- Gürçayır, Hınıs
