= Gölgeli =

Gölgeli (literally "shady" in Turkish) may refer to the following places in Turkey:

- Gölgeli, Ardahan, a village in the district of Ardahan, Ardahan Province
- Gölgeli, Kahta, a village in the district of Kahta, Adıyaman Province
