= Kartalpınar =

Kartalpınar can refer to:

- Kartalpınar, Ardahan
- Kartalpınar, Burdur
