= Uzunova =

Uzunova can refer to:

== Places ==
- Uzunova, Ardahan
- Uzunova, Kovancılar
- Uzunova, Kulp

== People ==
- Anastasia Uzunova (1862–1948), Macedonian Bulgarian revolutionary
