= Dağevi, Ardahan =

Dağevi
- Village
- Location within Turkey
- Coordinates: 41°05′15″N 42°26′50″E
- Country: Turkey
- Province: Ardahan
- District: Ardahan
- Population (2022): 166
- Time zone: UTC+3 (TRT)

Dağevi is a village in the Ardahan District, Ardahan Province, Turkey. Its population is 166 (2022).

== History ==
The historical Georgian name of Dağevi, Tebati (ტებათი), is derived from the word "tba" (ტბა: lake) and means "place of the lake". The settlement area of the extinct village of Tkistavi is located within the boundaries of Dağevi village.

== Geography ==
The village is 25 km from Ardahan city center. The nearest villages are Ardıçdere and Çatalköprü.

== Population ==
Historical population
| Year | Pop. | ±% p.a. |
|---|---|---|
| 1985 | 413 | — |
| 1990 | 322 | −4.86% |
| 1997 | 232 | −4.58% |
| 2007 | 176 | −2.72% |
| 2012 | 156 | −2.38% |
| 2017 | 165 | +1.13% |
| 2022 | 166 | +0.12% |
Source: 1985 census, 1990 census, 1997 census and TÜIK (2007-2022)
