= Sazlıçayır, Hanak =

Village in Ardahan Province, Turkey

Sazlıçayır
- Village
- Location within Turkey
- Coordinates: 41°17′N 42°57′E
- Country: Turkey
- Province: Ardahan
- District: Hanak
- Population (2021): 409
- Time zone: UTC+3 (TRT)

Sazlıçayır (formerly: Georgian: ახალშენი / Akhalsheni; Kurdish: Axaşen) is a village in the Hanak District, Ardahan Province, Turkey. The village is populated by Kurds of the Gelturan tribe and had a population of 409 in 2021.

== History ==
The former name of Sazlıçayır village is Akhalsheni. Akhalsheni (Georgian: ახალშენი), a Georgian place name, consists of the words ‘akhali’ (ახალი: new) and ‘sheni’ (შენი: dwelling), meaning ‘new village’. This place name entered Turkish as "Ahalşen" (اخالشین). However, the letter ‘L’ was dropped over time, and the village's name changed to "Ahaşen" (آخاشین).

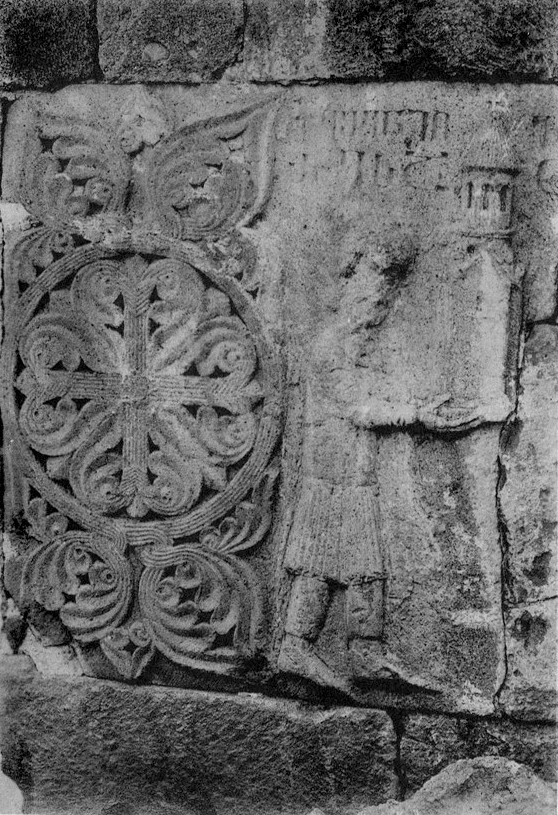
The decorations of Akhalsheni Church, the depiction of Nigvarai, son of the church's founder Saurmaga, and the Asomtavruli inscription, Ekvtime Takaishvili, 1902

Akhalsheni is located in the historical region of Erusheti, one of the early centres of Georgian Christianity. Indeed, the Ottomans seized this region and the village from the Georgians in the mid-16th century. The Georgian church in the village, Akhalsheni Church, dates back to this period. A note in a Bible preserved in the city of Kutaisi, Georgia, states that in 1492, the monks of the Georgian Iviron Monastery in Mount Athos requested that the ruler of Samtskhe-Saatabago, Kvarkvare II, his sons, and Mzechabuki donate the villages of ‘Beberani’ (today Çetinsu) and ‘Akhalshenni’ (Sazlıçayır) villages in the Artani region to the monastery.

The old Georgian church in the village, Akhalsheni Church, has been completely demolished and a mosque has been built in its place.
