= Vachara =

Vachara or Vajara (Georgian: ვაჭარა or ვაჯარა) is a village that has disappeared from the historical Artani region. The settlement area is now within the boundaries of the village of Alaçam (formerly Lower Tikani) in the Hanak district of Ardahan Province in Turkey.

== History ==
Vachara is recorded as "Vajar" (واجار) in the Ottoman land-survey register (mufassal defter) of 1595. The name of the village has also been written as "Vajara" (ვაჯარა) and "Bacara" (Баджара) in various sources.

The historical Artani region, where the village of Vachara was located, was one of the regions that formed Georgia in the Middle Ages. Indeed, the Ottomans seized this region and the village from the Georgians in the mid-16th century. According to the Ottoman land-survey register (mufassal defter) of 1595, Vachara was located in Meşe district (nahiye) of Ardahan-i Büzürg liva within the province of Georgia (Vilayet-i Gürcistan). Its population consisted of 36 Christian households, whose heads bore Georgian names. Wheat and barley farming and beekeeping were practised in the village, and pigs and sheep were raised. There were two water mills. In the Ottoman cebe register covering the period 1694–1732 in the Childir Eyalet, it had the same administrative status under the name "Vajar" (واجار). In 1116 AH (1704/1705), the village, with a revenue of 11,500 akçe, was granted to a man named Ebubekir.

Sergi Jikia, the Georgian Turkologist who published the Ottoman land-survey register (mufassal defter) of 1595, wrote that Vachara, written as Bacara (Баджара) on the Russian map, was located near the villages of Tikan (Тиканъ) and Kyarkyadan (Кяркядан). However, in the 1886 Russian census, although the villages of Tikani (Тиканъ) and Kyarkyadan (Кяркядан) are listed in the Ardahan district (uchastok) of the Ardahan sanjak, no village named Vacara (Bacara) is recorded. It can be understood from this record that the village of Vachara had disappeared before this date.
