= Büyüksütlüce, Ardahan =

Village in Ardahan Province, Turkey

Büyüksütlüce
- Village
- Location within Turkey
- Coordinates: 40°59′N 42°46′E
- Country: Turkey
- Province: Ardahan
- District: Ardahan
- Population (2021): 195
- Time zone: UTC+3 (TRT)

Büyüksütlüce is a village in the Ardahan District, Ardahan Province, Turkey. Its population is 195 (2021). The village is populated by Karapapakhs.

== Geography ==
The village is 17 km away from Ardahan city center.
