= Nakomlari =

Nakomlari (Georgian: ნაკომლარი) is an abandoned village in the historical Artani region of Georgia. Nakomlari also means ‘abandoned settlement’. The ruins of Nakomlari are located within the boundaries of the village of Tepesuyu, which is part of the central district of Ardahan province and was formerly known as ‘Gurji Beg’.

== History ==
The Artani was one of the regions that formed Georgia when it fell into Ottoman hands in the mid-16th century. Within the boundaries of the village now called Tepesuyu, two villages were recorded by the Ottoman administration in 1595, named after a Georgian lord (aznauri) who owned the land. [5] One was called "Küçük Gurci Beg" (كوچك كورجی بك) meaning "Little Gurci Beg" or "Gurci Beg" (كورجی بك), and the other was called "Gurci Beg-i Süfla" (كورجی بك سفلا) meaning "Lower Gurji Beg". In the village of Lower Gurji Beg (Gurci Beg-i Süfla), there were 30 households, all Christian. The village of Little Gurji Beg, however, had been completely abandoned. The place names indicate that these were old Georgian settlements. Indeed, according to the 1595 Ottoman census register, the population of the village of Aşağı Gurci Beg consisted of Georgians, with a small number of Armenians also living there. Nakomlari, located 2.5 kilometres southeast of the present-day Tepesuyu settlement, may have been the village of Little Gurji Beg.

The Nakomlari ruins, located southeast of the Tepesuyu settlement centre, spread over a wide area on top of a hill. A structure built using dry stone walling technique has an approximately oval shape. The walls of the structure follow the outer contours of the hill on which it stands. The structure has suffered extensive damage, and its walls have completely collapsed, turning into a pile of stones. Part of the north wall, built with large stones, has survived to the present day. Adjacent to this wall on the inside are small, completely destroyed structures with a round shape. On the western side, traces of a round structure built with medium-sized stones on higher ground are discernible.

The remains of the village church are also found at Nakomlari. The length of the eastern wall that has survived to the present day is 2 metres. Only the northern part of the western wall remains. A few stones remaining on the inner side of this wall indicate that the church was built using the infill wall technique and had smooth surface stones. There are remains of houses around the church. The church is also marked on an old Russian map.
