= Chaisi Church =

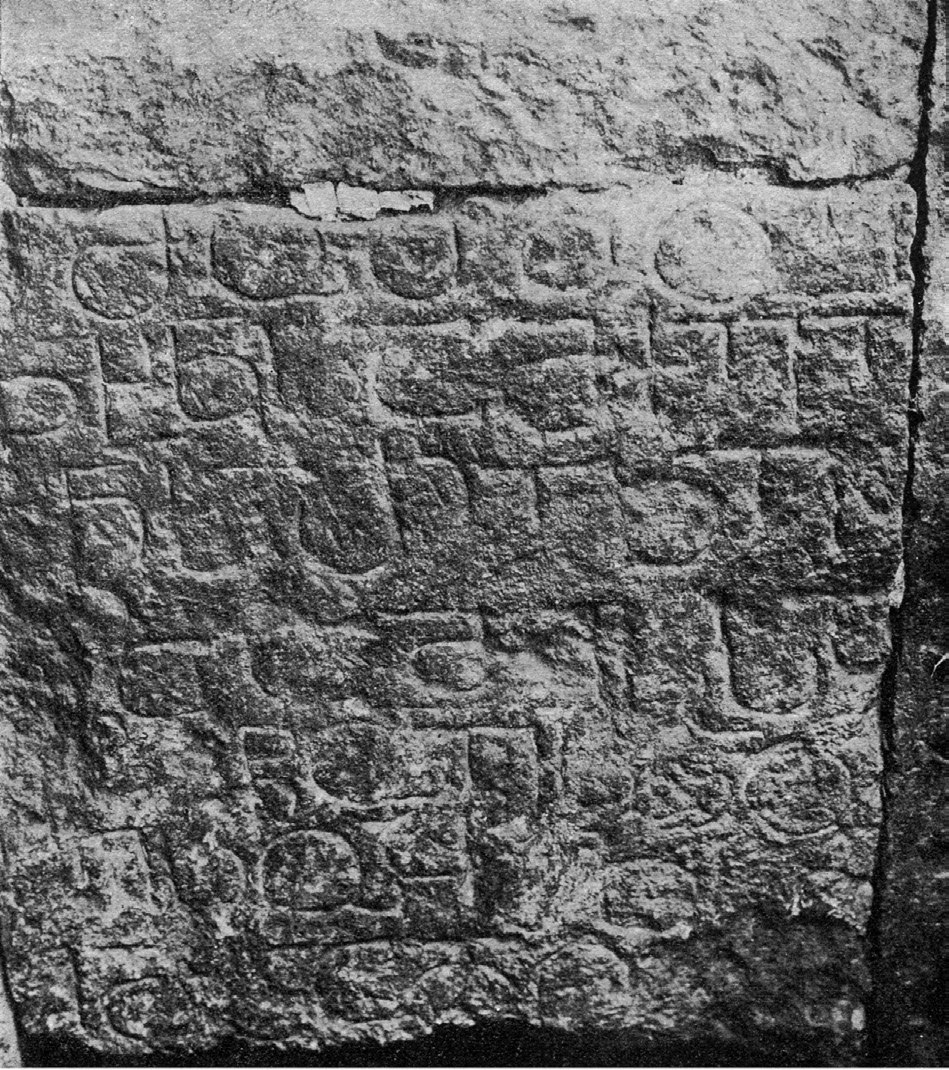
Chaisi Church, Georgian inscription, 1902, Ekvtime Takaishvili

Chaisi Church (Georgian: ჩაისის ეკლესია) is a medieval, Georgian church located in the Turkish part of the historical Javakheti region. Today, it is located in the village of Kayabeyi, formerly known as Chaisi, which is part of the Çıldır District of Ardahan Province in Turkey. Until recently, it was used as a mosque.

According to some sources, the Chaisi Church was built in the 9th century, while other sources claim it was built in the 14th-15th centuries.

The Church of Chaisi, dedicated to Saint Tevdore, was constructed using the fill technique and its façade is covered with neatly cut stones of various colours. The single-nave church is divided into three sections by pilasters. It has a deep apse with a semi-circular form. When it was converted into a mosque, windows were opened in the western and northern walls. According to the findings of Georgian historian Ekvtime Takaishvili in 1902, the entrance to the church, which had no dome, was located on the south side. However, after the building was converted into a mosque, an entrance door was opened on the north side, and the door on the south side was closed and turned into a mihrab niche. There was one window on each of the east, west and south facades of the building. There was a carved cross above the window on the western façade. The saddle-type roof was covered with stone slabs. The Georgian inscriptions on the doors and walls were faded. Takaishvili read the Georgian inscription, which he recorded in 1902 and published in 1909, as follows:

(წ)მო თოდ(რე) (გ)ლხკსა მიქელა გნსრლებ(ლ ს)ა ამისსა წდისა სდ რის უშლე (და) სლთა ადდე.

- Translation: "Saint Theodore, forgive the sinner Michael who completed this church and exalt his soul".
