= Çavlan, Şiran =

Çavlan
- Village
- Location within Turkey
- Coordinates: 40°03′27″N 39°07′27″E
- Country: Turkey
- Province: Gümüşhane
- District: Şiran
- Elevation: 1,790 m (5,870 ft)
- Population (2022): 24
- Time zone: UTC+3 (TRT)
- Area code: 0456
- Climate: Dsb

Çavlan is a village in Şiran District of Gümüşhane Province in Turkey. Its population is 24 (2022).
