= Yeşilbük, Şiran =

Yeşilbük
- Municipality
- Location in Turkey
- Coordinates: 40°13′2″N 38°59′15″E
- Country: Turkey
- Province: Gümüşhane
- District: Şiran
- Population (2022): 1,966
- Time zone: UTC+3 (TRT)

Yeşilbük is a town (belde) in the Şiran District, Gümüşhane Province, Turkey. Its population is 1,966 (2022).
