= Şiran District =

District of Gümüşhane Province, Turkey

- District
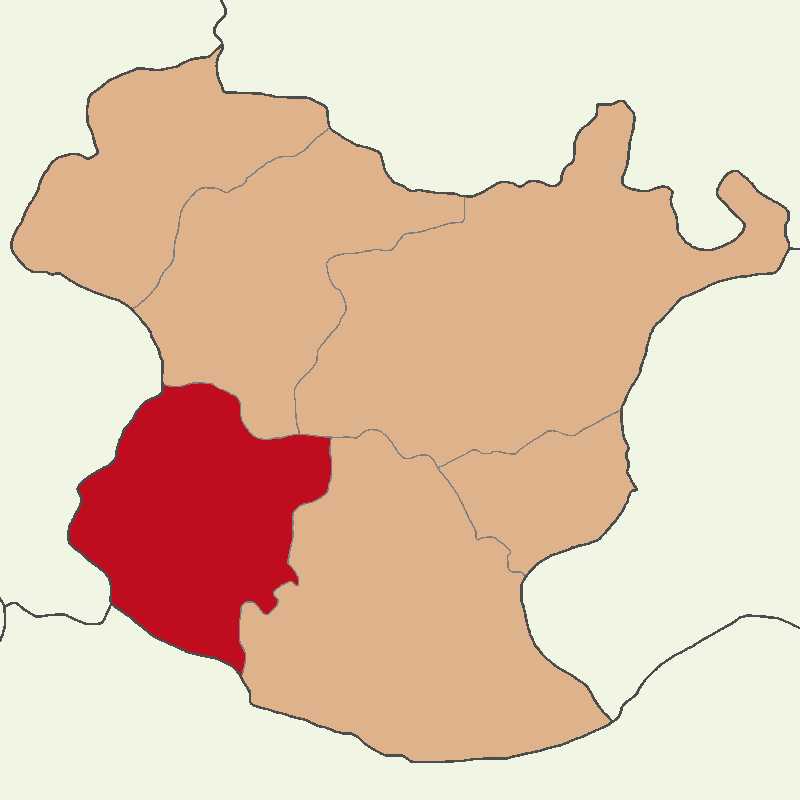
- Map showing Şiran District in Gümüşhane Province

- Location in Turkey
- Coordinates: 40°11′N 39°08′E
- Country: Turkey
- Province: Gümüşhane
- Seat: Şiran

Government
  - Kaymakam: Zahid Bahadır Semiz
- Area: 965 km^{2} (373 sq mi)
- Population (2022): 19,346
  - Density: 20/km^{2} (52/sq mi)
- Time zone: UTC+3 (TRT)
- Website: www.siran.gov.tr

Şiran District is a district of the Gümüşhane Province of Turkey. Its seat is the town of Şiran. Its area is 965 km^{2}, and its population is 19,346 (2022).

== Composition ==
There are two municipalities in Şiran District:

- Şiran
- Yeşilbük

There are 63 villages in Şiran District:

- Akbulak
- Akçalı
- Aksaray
- Alıç
- Araköy
- Ardıçlı
- Arıtaş
- Aşağıduruçay
- Babacan
- Babuş
- Bahçeli
- Balıkhisar
- Başköy
- Belen
- Boğazyayla
- Bolluk
- Çağıl
- Çakırkaya
- Çalköy
- Çambaşı
- Çanakçı
- Çatmalar
- Çavlan
- Çevrepınar
- Darıbükü
- Dilekyolu
- Dumanoluğu
- Eldiğin
- Elmaçukuru
- Ericek
- Evren
- Gökçeler
- Günbatur
- Günyüzü
- Güreşköy
- İncedere
- İnözü
- Kadıçayırı
- Karaşeyh
- Kavaklıdere
- Kavakpınarı
- Kaynakbaşı
- Kırıntı
- Koyunbaba
- Kozağaç
- Ozanca
- Paşapınarı
- Pelitli
- Sadıkköy
- Sarıca
- Selimiye
- Sellidere
- Seydibaba
- Sinanlı
- Söğütalan
- Susuz
- Telme
- Tepedam
- Yedibölük
- Yeniköy
- Yolbilen
- Yukarı Duruçay
- Yukarıkulaca
