= Erusheti =

Medieval Georgian fiefdom

Coordinates: 41.3°N 42.7°E

Erusheti (Georgian: ერუშეთი) was a medieval Georgian fiefdom, currently part of the Ardahan Province in northeastern Turkey, close to the border with Georgia. The district was centered in the eponymous settlement, at the present-day village Oğuzyolu, which, according to the medieval historical tradition, was one of the earliest centres of Christianity in Georgia. Ruins of Christian churches are found throughout the region. In modern Georgia, the name "Erusheti" is preserved as a designation of a mountainous range along the border with Turkey.

== History ==
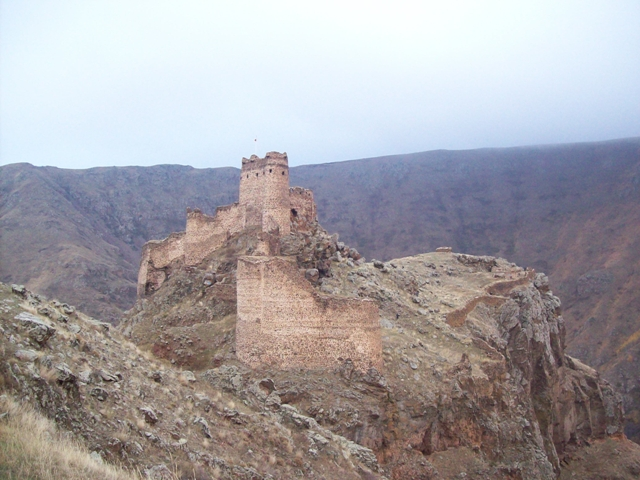
Ruins of the medieval castle Kajt'a-tsikhe (Şeytan Kalesi) at the village Yıldırımtepe.

The name "Erusheti" was applied by the medieval Georgians to the territory in the Kura or Mtkvari river valley around the eponymous town or fortress, north of Artani (Ardahan), between the Arsiani Range (Yalnızçam Dağları) and Kartsakhi Lake (Aktaş Gölü). Erusheti was contiguous with the province of Javakheti and is considered to have been its "lower" or "western" part.

According to Cyril Toumanoff, Javakheti, together with Erusheti, was part of the Iberian duchy of Tsunda from the 4th or 3rd century BC. While its eastern counterpart was at times conquered by the Artaxiads and Arsacids of Armenia, Erusheti/West Javakheti firmly remained within the Iberian realm, eventually becoming a Bagratid domain c. 780.

The Georgian historical tradition makes Erusheti, along with Mtskheta and Manglisi, one of the earliest church establishments in Kartli (Iberia) following King Mirian's conversion to Christianity in the 330s. According to the 11th-century historian Leonti Mroveli, Erusheti was the first place which the bishop John of Kartli, returning from his mission to Constantinople with a group of Byzantine priests and masons, chose to build a Christian church. There, the chronicle continues, he left a treasure and the nails of the Lord brought from Constantinople, to the disappointment of King Mirian who wanted to have the relics at his capital, Mtskheta. The church at Erusheti was further adorned by one of Mirian's successors Mihrdat III later in the 4th century and it became a seat of the homonymous bishopric under Vakhtang I in the 5th century. Erusheti was dispossessed of its holy relics by the Byzantine emperor Heraclius who passed through Kartli during his war with Iran in the 620s.

After the Ottoman Empire took over Erusheti as part of its acquisitions in southwestern Georgia in the 16th century, Christianity and the Georgian culture went in steady decline. The early 18th-century Georgian scholar Prince Vakhushti of Kartli reported that a cathedral church still stood in Erusheti, but it was no more in use. The Georgian archaeologist Ekvtime Takaishvili, visiting Erusheti in 1902, found that only the elderly could understand the Georgian language. He identified a three-nave basilica at the village of Oğuzyolu, near Hanak, as the church of Erusheti, of which only a ruined apse was found by Bruno Baumgartner in 1990. Of other monuments described by Takaishvili, the domed tetraconch church of St. George of Gogubani or Gogiuba, at Binbaşak, now stands in ruins and nothing remains of an important cruciform domed church of the Holy Mother of God of Tsqarostavi at Öncül. Better preserved are single-nave churches at Berki (Börk) and Chaishi (Kayabeyi), the latter currently being in use as a mosque.
