= Aşağıkurtoğlu, Ardahan =

Village in Ardahan Province, Turkey

Aşağıkurtoğlu
- Village
- Location within Turkey
- Coordinates: 41°01′30″N 42°54′15″E
- Country: Turkey
- Province: Ardahan
- District: Ardahan
- Population (2021): 230
- Time zone: UTC+3 (TRT)

Aşağıkurtoğlu is a village in the Ardahan District, Ardahan Province, Turkey. The village is populated by Kurds and had a population of 230 in 2021.
