= Güzçimeni, Ardahan =

Güzçimeni
- Village
- Location within Turkey
- Coordinates: 41°04′25″N 42°38′30″E
- Country: Turkey
- Province: Ardahan
- District: Ardahan
- Population (2021): 120
- Time zone: UTC+3 (TRT)

Güzçimeni is a village in the Ardahan District, Ardahan Province, Turkey. Its population is 120 (2021).
