= Tepesuyu, Ardahan =

Tepesuyu
- Village
- Location within Turkey
- Coordinates: 41°04′52″N 42°44′26″E
- Country: Turkey
- Province: Ardahan
- District: Ardahan
- Population (2021): 219
- Time zone: UTC+3 (TRT)

Tepesuyu is a village in the Ardahan District, Ardahan Province, Turkey. Its population is 219 (2021).

The former name of Tepesuyu is Gurjibeg. In Persian and Turkish languages, ‘Gurji’ is the name given to Georgians. Georgian journalist and researcher Konstantine Martvileli wrote that this place name is related to the Georgian word aznauri, translated as ‘beg’ in Turkish. Indeed, this settlement is recorded as "Gurji Beg" (كورجی بك) in the Ottoman land-survey register (mufassal defter) of 1595. It is thought that this name originated because the owner of the village's land was Georgian. This place name also appears as "Gurji Beg" (كورجی بك) in the Ottoman village list dated 1928.

Remains of the Gurji Beg Church and various other structures have been identified in the village of Tepesuyu. The remains of the village church are located in Nakomlari, southeast of the village centre. Nakomlari (Georgian: ნაკომლარი) is derived from the Georgian word ‘komli’ (Georgian: კომლი), meaning ‘abandoned settlement’ in the Georgian language. It is believed that Nakomlari is the village recorded by the Ottomans in 1595 under the name ‘Küçük Gurci Beg’ (Turkish: كوچك كورجی بك).
