= Altaş, Ardahan =

Altaş
- Village
- Location within Turkey
- Coordinates: 41°09′43″N 42°52′30″E
- Country: Turkey
- Province: Ardahan
- District: Ardahan
- Population (2021): 156
- Time zone: UTC+3 (TRT)

Altaş is a village in the Ardahan District, Ardahan Province, Turkey. The village is populated by Turks.
