= Lehimli, Ardahan =

Village in Ardahan Province, Turkey

Lehimli
- Village
- Location within Turkey
- Coordinates: 40°59′45″N 42°56′45″E
- Country: Turkey
- Province: Ardahan
- District: Ardahan
- Population (2021): 469
- Time zone: UTC+3 (TRT)

Lehimli (Kurdish: Legemlî) is a village in the Ardahan District, Ardahan Province, Turkey. The village is populated by Kurds and had a population of 496 in 2021.
