= Çayağzı, Hanak =

Çayağzı
- Village
- Location within Turkey
- Coordinates: 41.1922°N 42.8508°E
- Country: Turkey
- Province: Ardahan
- District: Hanak
- Population (2021): 217
- Time zone: UTC+3 (TRT)

Çayağzı is a village in the Hanak District, Ardahan Province, Turkey. Its population is 217 (2021).
