= Hanák =

Hanák (feminine: Hanáková) is a Czech surname, meaning 'inhabitant of Haná'. Notable people with the surname include:

- Alena Hanáková (born 1958), Czech politician
- Andrea Hanak (born 1969), German painter
- Anton Hanak (1875–1934), Austrian sculptor
- Dušan Hanák (born 1938), Slovak film director
- Jakub Hanák (born 1983), Czech rower
- Jiří Hanák (1938–2020), Czech journalist and political activist
- Mirko Hanák (1921–1971), Czech painter and illustrator
- Tomáš Hanák (born 1957), Czech actor and comedian

== See also ==
- Hanak, a town in Turkey
