= Altınemek, Hanak =

Altınemek
- Village
- Location within Turkey
- Coordinates: 41°17′N 42°43′E
- Country: Turkey
- Province: Ardahan
- District: Hanak
- Population (2021): 44
- Time zone: UTC+3 (TRT)

Altınemek is a village in the Hanak District, Ardahan Province, Turkey. Its population is 44 (2021).
