= Kocaköy, Ardahan =

Kocaköy
- Village
- Location within Turkey
- Coordinates: 41°03′30″N 42°44′00″E
- Country: Turkey
- Province: Ardahan
- District: Ardahan
- Population (2021): 152
- Time zone: UTC+3 (TRT)

Kocaköy is a village in the Ardahan District, Ardahan Province, Turkey. Its population is 152 (2021).
