= Binbaşar, Ardahan =

Village in Ardahan Province, Turkey

Binbaşar
- Village
- Location within Turkey
- Coordinates: 40°59′33″N 42°58′10″E
- Country: Turkey
- Province: Ardahan
- District: Ardahan
- Population (2021): 318
- Time zone: UTC+3 (TRT)

Binbaşar (Kurdish: Mûrg, Murxan) is a village in the Ardahan District, Ardahan Province, Turkey. The village is populated by Kurds and had a population of 318 in 2021.
