= Yamaçyolu, Hanak =

Yamaçyolu
- Village
- Location in Turkey
- Coordinates: 41°16′N 42°43′E
- Country: Turkey
- Province: Ardahan
- District: Hanak
- Population (2021): 100
- Time zone: UTC+3 (TRT)

Yamaçyolu is a village in the Hanak District, Ardahan Province, Turkey. Its population is 100 (2021).

Balvana, a vanished Georgian village, was located within the present-day borders of Yamaçyolu.
