= Güzelyurt, Ardahan =

Village in Ardahan Province, Turkey

Güzelyurt
- Village
- Location within Turkey
- Coordinates: 41°06′01″N 42°51′45″E
- Country: Turkey
- Province: Ardahan
- District: Ardahan
- Population (2021): 107
- Time zone: UTC+3 (TRT)

Güzelyurt, formerly Kuşuçmaz (Kurdish: Xapal) is a village in the Ardahan District, Ardahan Province, Turkey. The village is populated by Kurds of the Cunikan tribe and had a population of 107 in 2021.
