= Ömerağa, Ardahan =

Village in Ardahan Province, Turkey

Ömerağa
- Village
- Location within Turkey
- Coordinates: 40°58′12″N 42°56′47″E
- Country: Turkey
- Province: Ardahan
- District: Ardahan
- Population (2021): 169
- Time zone: UTC+3 (TRT)

Ömerağa (Kurdish: Omeraxa) is a village in the Ardahan District, Ardahan Province, Turkey. The village is populated by Kurds and had a population of 169 in 2021.
