= Yukarıkurtoğlu, Ardahan =

Village in Ardahan Province, Turkey

Yukarıkurtoğlu
- Village
- Location within Turkey
- Coordinates: 41°01′20″N 42°55′10″E
- Country: Turkey
- Province: Ardahan
- District: Ardahan
- Population (2021): 432
- Time zone: UTC+3 (TRT)

Yukarıkurtoğlu is a village in the Ardahan District, Ardahan Province, Turkey. The village is populated by Kurds and had a population of 432 in 2021.
