= Kazlıköy, Ardahan =

Kazlıköy
- Village
- Location within Turkey
- Coordinates: 41°08′50″N 42°34′40″E
- Country: Turkey
- Province: Ardahan
- District: Ardahan
- Population (2021): 134
- Time zone: UTC+3 (TRT)

Kazlıköy is a village in the Ardahan District, Ardahan Province, Turkey. Its population is 134 (2021).
