= Serinkuyu, Hanak =

Serinkuyu
- Village
- Location within Turkey
- Coordinates: 41°17′N 42°45′E
- Country: Turkey
- Province: Ardahan
- District: Hanak
- Population (2021): 201
- Time zone: UTC+3 (TRT)

Serinkuyu is a village in the Hanak District, Ardahan Province, Turkey. Its population is 201 (2021). The village is populated by Turkmens.
