= Meşedibi, Ardahan =

Meşedibi
- Village
- Location within Turkey
- Coordinates: 40.9843°N 42.6801°E
- Country: Turkey
- Province: Ardahan
- District: Ardahan
- Population (2021): 509
- Time zone: UTC+3 (TRT)

Meşedibi, also known as Motrofka, is a village in the Ardahan District, Ardahan Province, Turkey. The village is populated by Kurds of the Bekiran tribe and had a population of 509 in 2021.

In 2008 it passed from the Göle District to the Ardahan District.
