= Kıraç, Ardahan =

Kıraç
- Village
- Location within Turkey
- Coordinates: 41°08′10″N 42°35′05″E
- Country: Turkey
- Province: Ardahan
- District: Ardahan
- Population (2021): 27
- Time zone: UTC+3 (TRT)

Kıraç is a village in the Ardahan District, Ardahan Province, Turkey. Its population is 27 (2021).
