= Baştoklu, Hanak =

Baştoklu
- Village
- Location within Turkey
- Coordinates: 41°13′N 42°48′E
- Country: Turkey
- Province: Ardahan
- District: Hanak
- Population (2021): 330
- Time zone: UTC+3 (TRT)

Baştoklu is a village in the Hanak District, Ardahan Province, Turkey. Its population is 330 (2021).
