= Çiçeklidağ, Hanak =

Çiçeklidağ
- Village
- Location within Turkey
- Coordinates: 41°18′N 42°44′E
- Country: Turkey
- Province: Ardahan
- District: Hanak
- Population (2021): 597
- Time zone: UTC+3 (TRT)

Çiçeklidağ is a village in the Hanak District, Ardahan Province, Turkey. Its population is 597 (2021). The village is populated by Turkmens.
