= Gugars =

People of Caucasian Iberia

Map of Ancient Georgian states c. 600 - 150 BC. Places inhabited by Gugars in a pale shade brown(right).

The Gugars were a people of Caucasian Iberia, settling near the Debeda river, mentioned by Strabo.

They were presumably an early Georgian (Kartvelian) people (Georgian: გუგარები, gugarebi).The toponym Gogarene, an integral part of Caucasian Iberia, is derived from their name. The region is first mentioned by Strabo who records it as a province of Iberia. Later it was renamed Gugark, after the conquests of Arshakid Armenian rulers in the 2nd century BC.

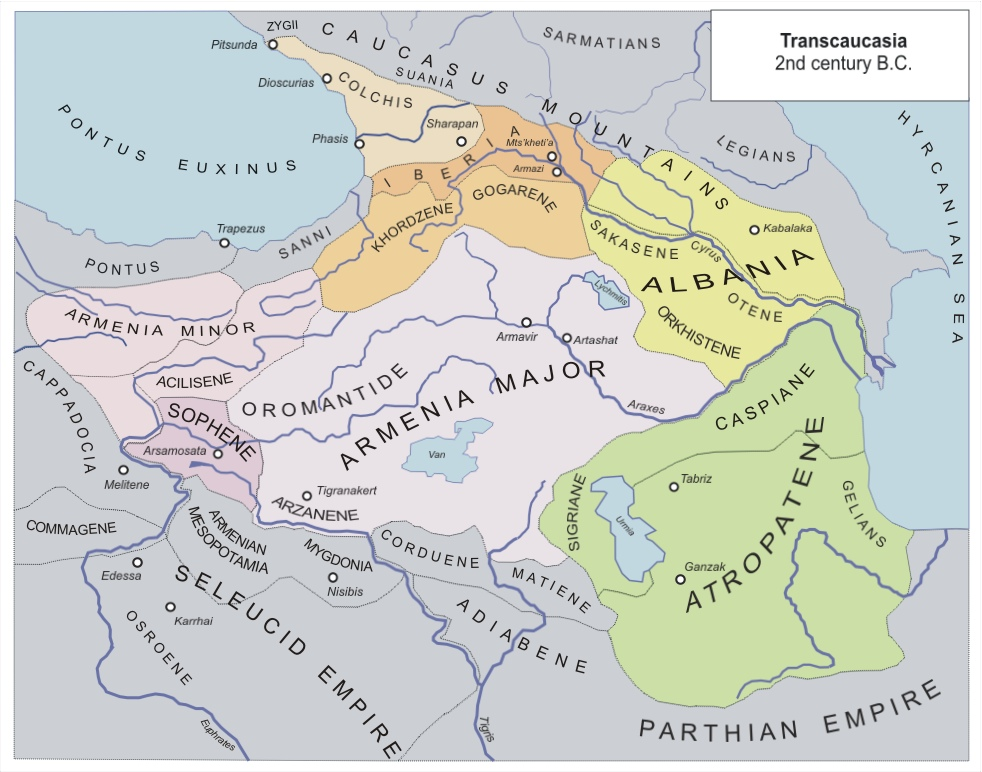
Gogarene, integral part of Iberia, at times annexed by Armenia
