= Çimenkaya, Ardahan =

Çimenkaya
- Village
- Location within Turkey
- Coordinates: 41°06′15″N 42°29′50″E
- Country: Turkey
- Province: Ardahan
- District: Ardahan
- Population (2021): 118
- Time zone: UTC+3 (TRT)

Çimenkaya is a village in the Ardahan District, Ardahan Province, Turkey. Its population is 118 (2021).
