= Tunçoluk =

Village in Ardahan Province, Turkey

- Village
- Location within Turkey
- Coordinates: 41°00′30″N 42°59′15″E
- Country: Turkey
- Province: Ardahan
- District: Ardahan
- Population (2021): 904
- Time zone: UTC+3 (TRT)

Tunçoluk (Kurdish: Panîg) is a village in the Ardahan District, Ardahan Province, Turkey. The village is populated by Kurds and had a population of 904 in 2021.
