= Yukarıaydere, Hanak =

Yukarıaydere
- Village
- Location within Turkey
- Coordinates: 41°22′N 42°42′E
- Country: Turkey
- Province: Ardahan
- District: Hanak
- Population (2021): 108
- Time zone: UTC+3 (TRT)

Yukarıaydere is a village in the Hanak District, Ardahan Province, Turkey. Its population is 108 (2021).
