= Çeğilli, Ardahan =

Çeğilli
- Village
- Location within Turkey
- Coordinates: 41°06′50″N 42°31′15″E
- Country: Turkey
- Province: Ardahan
- District: Ardahan
- Population (2021): 188
- Time zone: UTC+3 (TRT)

Çeğilli is a village in the Ardahan District, Ardahan Province, Turkey. Its population is 188 (2021).
