= Beşiktaş, Ardahan =

Village in Ardahan Province, Turkey

Beşiktaş
- Village
- Location within Turkey
- Coordinates: 40°54′40″N 42°52′20″E
- Country: Turkey
- Province: Ardahan
- District: Ardahan
- Population (2021): 342
- Time zone: UTC+3 (TRT)

Beşiktaş is a village in the Ardahan District, Ardahan Province, Turkey. The village is populated by Kurds and had a population of 342 in 2021.
