= Yokuşdibi, Ardahan =

Yokuşdibi
- Village
- Location within Turkey
- Coordinates: 41°10′20″N 42°34′30″E
- Country: Turkey
- Province: Ardahan
- District: Ardahan
- Population (2021): 122
- Time zone: UTC+3 (TRT)

Yokuşdibi is a village in the Ardahan District, Ardahan Province, Turkey. Its population is 122 (2021).
