= Derindere, Ardahan =

Derindere
- Village
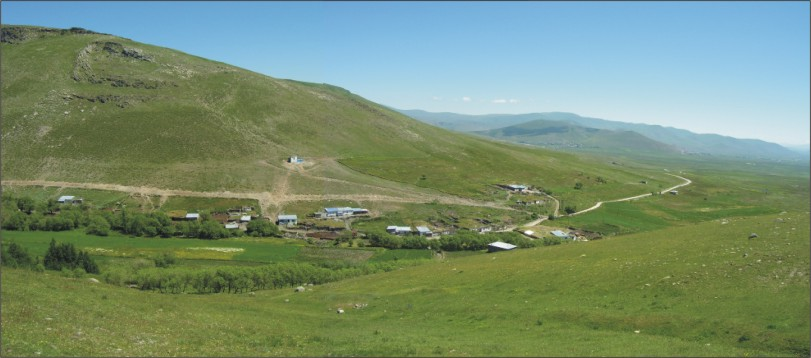

- Location within Turkey
- Coordinates: 41.161°N 42.530°E
- Country: Turkey
- Province: Ardahan
- District: Ardahan
- Population (2021): 73
- Time zone: UTC+3 (TRT)

Derindere is a village in the Ardahan District, Ardahan Province, Turkey. Its population is 73 (2021).

The historical name of Derindere village is Kheva. The Georgian place name Kheva (ხევა) derives from the word "hevi" (ხევი), meaning "valley" or "stream." Indeed, Georgian researcher Konstantine Martvileli writes that the village was given this name because it was located at the head of a stream.
