= Sulakyurt, Ardahan =

Village in Ardahan Province, Turkey

Sulakyurt
- Village
- Location within Turkey
- Coordinates: 41°09′45″N 42°37′25″E
- Country: Turkey
- Province: Ardahan
- District: Ardahan
- Elevation: 1,920 m (6,300 ft)
- Population (2021): 914
- Time zone: UTC+3 (TRT)
- Postal code: 75000
- Area code: 0478

Sulakyurt, formerly Sarzep (Georgian: სარწები, Sarts'ebi) is a village in the Ardahan District, Ardahan Province, Turkey. Its population is 914 (2021). The village is populated by Meskhetian Turks.

It was formerly populated by Molokans.
