= Yünbüken, Hanak =

Yünbüken
- Village
- Location within Turkey
- Coordinates: 41.2700°N 42.8756°E
- Country: Turkey
- Province: Ardahan
- District: Hanak
- Population (2021): 123
- Time zone: UTC+3 (TRT)

Yünbüken is a village in the Hanak District, Ardahan Province, Turkey. Its population is 123 (2021).
