= Çataldere, Ardahan =

Çataldere
- Village
- Location within Turkey
- Coordinates: 41°11′55″N 42°36′45″E
- Country: Turkey
- Province: Ardahan
- District: Ardahan
- Population (2021): 277
- Time zone: UTC+3 (TRT)

Çataldere is a village in the Ardahan District, Ardahan Province, Turkey. Its population is 277 (2021).
