= Çimliçayır, Hanak =

Çimliçayır
- Village
- Location in Turkey
- Coordinates: 41°17′N 42°46′E
- Country: Turkey
- Province: Ardahan
- District: Hanak
- Population (2021): 105
- Time zone: UTC+3 (TRT)

Çimliçayır is a village in the Hanak District, Ardahan Province, Turkey. Its population is 105 (2021). The village is populated by Turkmens.
