= Hanak District =

District of Ardahan Province, Turkey

- District
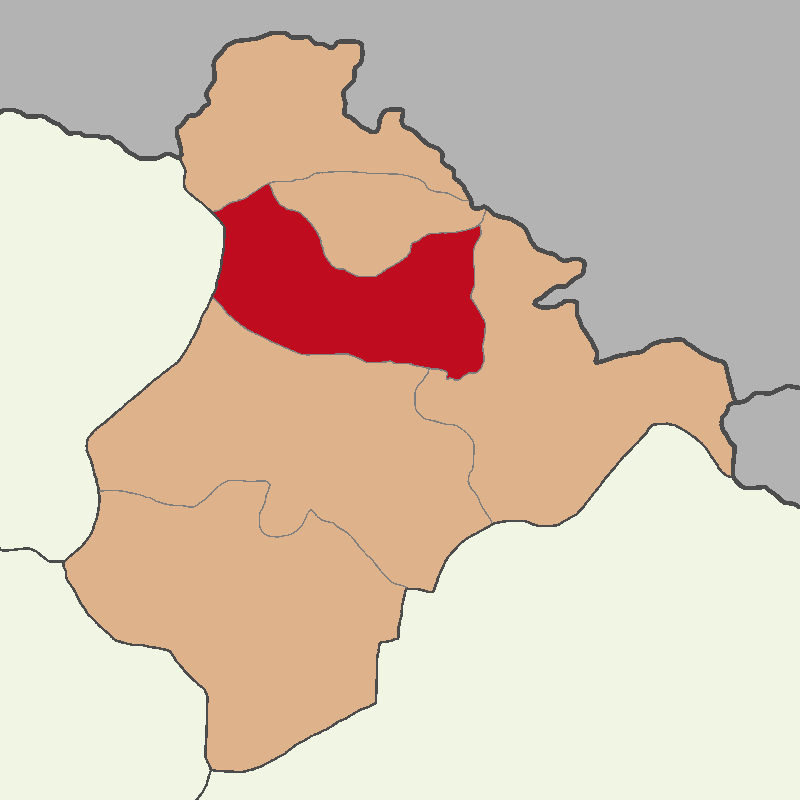
- Map showing Hanak District in Ardahan Province

- Location in Turkey
- Coordinates: 41°14′N 42°51′E
- Country: Turkey
- Province: Ardahan
- Seat: Hanak

Government
  - Kaymakam: Ömer Övünç Koşansu
- Area: 647 km^{2} (250 sq mi)
- Population (2021): 8,418
  - Density: 13/km^{2} (34/sq mi)
- Time zone: UTC+3 (TRT)
- Website: www.hanak.gov.tr

Hanak District is a district of Ardahan Province of Turkey. Its seat is the town Hanak. Its area is 647 km^{2}, and its population is 8,418 (2021).

== Composition ==
There is one municipality in Hanak District:

- Hanak

There are 26 villages in Hanak District:

- Altınemek
- Arıkonak
- Aşağıaydere
- Baştoklu
- Binbaşak
- Börk
- Çatköy
- Çavdarlı
- Çayağzı
- Çiçeklidağ
- Çimliçayır
- Dilekdere
- Geç
- Güneşgören
- İncedere
- Karakale
- Koyunpınarı
- Oğuzyolu
- Sazlıçayır
- Serinkuyu
- Sevimli
- Sulakçayır
- Yamaçyolu
- Yamçılı
- Yukarıaydere
- Yünbüken
