= Hanuka =

Hanuka is a surname. Notable people with the surname include:

- Asaf Hanuka (born 1974), Israeli illustrator and comic book artist
- Tomer Hanuka (born 1974), Israeli illustrator and comic book artist
- Shlomi Hanuka (born 1985), Israeli football/soccer player

== See also ==
- Hanukkah
