= Kars Eyalet =

Administrative division of the Ottoman Empire from 1580 to 1875

Eyālet-i Ḳarṣ
- Eyalet of the Ottoman Empire
- 1580–1845
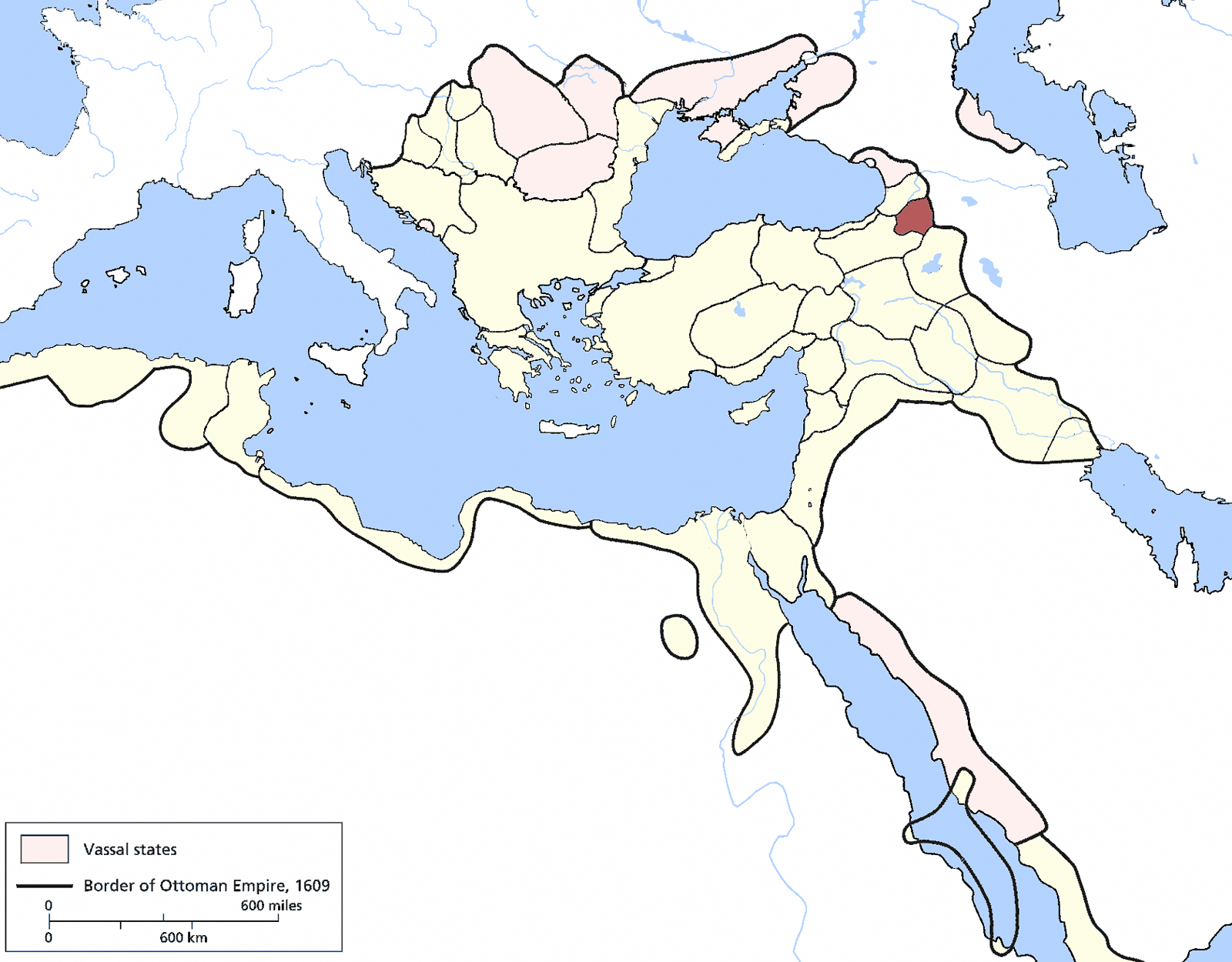
- The Kars Eyalet in 1609
- Capital: Kars
- History
  - Established: 1580
  - Disestablished: 1845
Preceded by	Succeeded by
Safavid dynasty	Erzurum Vilayet

The Eyalet of Kars (Ottoman Turkish: ایالت قارص, romanized: Eyālet-i Ḳarṣ) was an eyalet (province) of the Ottoman Empire. Its reported area in the 19th century was 6,212 square miles (16,090 km^{2}).

The town of Kars, which had been levelled to the ground by the Timur in 1386, was rebuilt as an Ottoman fortress in 1579 (1580 according to other sources) by Lala Mustafa Pasha, and became capital of an eyalet of six sanjaks and also a place of pilgrimage. It was conquered by Shah Abbas in 1604 and rebuilt by the Turks in 1616.

The size of the Kars garrison in 1640s was 1,002 Janissaries and 301 local recruits. Total 1,303 garrison.

In 1845, the eyalet was dissolved and transferred to the Erzurum Eyalet.

== Administrative divisions ==
Sanjaks of Kars Eyalet in the 17th century:

1. Little Erdehan Sanjak (Göle)
2. Hujujan Sanjak (Höçvan)
1. Zarshad Sanjak (Arpaçay)
2. Kechran Sanjak (Tunçkaya (Keçivan))
3. Kaghizman Sanjak (Kağızman)
4. Kars Sanjak, the seat of the Pasha
