= Çalabaş, Ardahan =

Village in Ardahan Province, Turkey

Çalabaş
- Village
- Location within Turkey
- Coordinates: 40°57′40″N 42°53′25″E
- Country: Turkey
- Province: Ardahan
- District: Ardahan
- Population (2021): 346
- Time zone: UTC+3 (TRT)

Çalabaş is a village in the Ardahan District, Ardahan Province, Turkey. The village is populated by Kurds and had a population of 346 in 2021.
