= Dedegül, Ardahan =

Dedegül
- Village
- Location within Turkey
- Coordinates: 41°07′05″N 42°34′10″E
- Country: Turkey
- Province: Ardahan
- District: Ardahan
- Population (2021): 175
- Time zone: UTC+3 (TRT)

Dedegül is a village in the Ardahan District, Ardahan Province, Turkey. Its population is 175 (2021).

The historical name of Dedegül is Dadaguli. Dadaguli (დადაგული), a Georgian place name, means "burnt". It was recorded as Dada Gul (ددە كول) in the Ottoman land-survey register (mufassal defter) of 1595.
