= Çatköy, Hanak =

Çatköy
- Village
- Location within Turkey
- Coordinates: 41.306°N 42.707°E
- Country: Turkey
- Province: Ardahan
- District: Hanak
- Population (2021): 155
- Time zone: UTC+3 (TRT)

Çatköy is a village in the Hanak District, Ardahan Province, Turkey. Its population is 155 (2021). The village is populated by Turkmens.
