= Otbiçen, Ardahan =

Otbiçen
- Village
- Location within Turkey
- Coordinates: 41°00′18″N 42°53′55″E
- Country: Turkey
- Province: Ardahan
- District: Ardahan
- Population (2021): 211
- Time zone: UTC+3 (TRT)

Otbiçen (Kurdish: Qimilî) is a village in the Ardahan District, Ardahan Province, Turkey. The village is populated by Kurds and had a population of 211 in 2021.
