= Koyunpınarı, Hanak =

Koyunpınarı
- Village
- Location within Turkey
- Coordinates: 41°15′N 42°47′E
- Country: Turkey
- Province: Ardahan
- District: Hanak
- Population (2021): 817
- Time zone: UTC+3 (TRT)

Koyunpınarı is a village in the Hanak District, Ardahan Province, Turkey. Its population is 817 (2021). The village is populated by Turkmens.
