= Sarıyamaç, Ardahan =

Sarıyamaç
- Village
- Location within Turkey
- Coordinates: 41°09′53″N 42°33′10″E
- Country: Turkey
- Province: Ardahan
- District: Ardahan
- Population (2021): 101
- Time zone: UTC+3 (TRT)

Sarıyamaç is a village in the Ardahan District, Ardahan Province, Turkey. Its population is 101 (2021).
