= Açıkyazı, Ardahan =

Açıkyazı
- Village
- Location within Turkey
- Coordinates: 41°08′33″N 42°35′53″E
- Country: Turkey
- Province: Ardahan
- District: Ardahan
- Population (2021): 102
- Time zone: UTC+3 (TRT)

Açıkyazı is a village in the Ardahan District, Ardahan Province, Turkey. Its population is 102 (2021).

The Georgian village of Shuaeklesia was within the present-day borders of Açıkyazı village.
