= Güneşgören, Hanak =

Güneşgören
- Village
- Location in Turkey
- Coordinates: 41.2235°N 42.7339°E
- Country: Turkey
- Province: Ardahan
- District: Hanak
- Population (2021): 167
- Time zone: UTC+3 (TRT)

Güneşgören is a village in the Hanak District, Ardahan Province, Turkey. Its population is 167 (2021). The village is populated by Turkmens.
