= Küçüksütlüce, Ardahan =

Village in Ardahan Province, Turkey

Küçüksütlüce
- Village
- Location within Turkey
- Coordinates: 41°00′55″N 42°46′10″E
- Country: Turkey
- Province: Ardahan
- District: Ardahan
- Population (2021): 330
- Time zone: UTC+3 (TRT)

Küçüksütlüce (Kurdish: Xarzîyan) is a village in the Ardahan District, Ardahan Province, Turkey. The village is populated by Kurds of the Cunikan tribe and had a population of 330 in 2021.
