= Ağzıpek, Ardahan =

Ağzıpek
- Village
- Location within Turkey
- Coordinates: 41°05′55″N 42°37′35″E
- Country: Turkey
- Province: Ardahan
- District: Ardahan
- Population (2021): 221
- Time zone: UTC+3 (TRT)

Ağzıpek is a village in the Ardahan District, Ardahan Province, Turkey. Its population is 221 (2021).

The former name of the villages of Ağzıpek and Sugöze is "Chinchrobi". The Georgian place name Chinchrobi (Georgian: ჭინჭრობი) refers to places where nettles grow. In old records, the village of Ağzıpek is referred to first as "Upper Chinchrobi" or "Cincrob-i Ulya" (جنجروب علیا), then as "Great Chinchrobi" or "Büyük Cincrob" (بیوك جنجروب).
