= Ölçek, Ardahan =

Ölçek
- Village
- Location within Turkey
- Coordinates: 41°07′30″N 42°51′15″E
- Country: Turkey
- Province: Ardahan
- District: Ardahan
- Population (2021): 625
- Time zone: UTC+3 (TRT)

Ölçek is a village in the Ardahan District, Ardahan Province, Turkey. Its population is 625 (2021).
