= Değirmenli, Ardahan =

Değirmenli
- Village
- Location within Turkey
- Coordinates: 41°10′35″N 42°35′40″E
- Country: Turkey
- Province: Ardahan
- District: Ardahan
- Population (2021): 193
- Time zone: UTC+3 (TRT)

Değirmenli is a village in the Ardahan District, Ardahan Province, Turkey. Its population is 193 (2021).
