= Ağaçlı, Ardahan =

Ağaçlı
- Village
- Location within Turkey
- Coordinates: 40°57′05″N 42°51′40″E
- Country: Turkey
- Province: Ardahan
- District: Ardahan
- Population (2021): 101
- Time zone: UTC+3 (TRT)

Ağaçlı, formerly Çobanlı (Kurdish: Kêllik), is a village in the Ardahan District, Ardahan Province, Turkey. The village is populated by Kurds and had a population of 101 in 2021.
