= Ortageçit, Ardahan =

Ortageçit
- Village
- Location within Turkey
- Coordinates: 41°07′50″N 42°44′15″E
- Country: Turkey
- Province: Ardahan
- District: Ardahan
- Population (2021): 217
- Time zone: UTC+3 (TRT)

Ortageçit is a village in the Ardahan District, Ardahan Province, Turkey. Its population is 217 (2021).
