= Balıkçılar, Ardahan =

Balıkçılar
- Village
- Location within Turkey
- Coordinates: 41°09′10″N 42°50′20″E
- Country: Turkey
- Province: Ardahan
- District: Ardahan
- Population (2021): 148
- Time zone: UTC+3 (TRT)

Balıkçılar is a village in the Ardahan District, Ardahan Province, Turkey. Its population is 148 (2021).
