= Gürçayır, Ardahan =

Gürçayır
- Neighbourhood
- Location in Turkey
- Coordinates: 41°05′15″N 42°41′30″E
- Country: Turkey
- Province: Ardahan
- District: Ardahan
- Municipality: Ardahan
- Population (2021): 215
- Time zone: UTC+3 (TRT)

Gürçayır is a neighbourhood of the town Ardahan, Ardahan District, Ardahan Province, Turkey. Its population is 215 (2021).
