= Yaylacık, Ardahan =

Yaylacık
- Village
- Location within Turkey
- Coordinates: 41°05′15″N 42°42′45″E
- Country: Turkey
- Province: Ardahan
- District: Ardahan
- Population (2021): 208
- Time zone: UTC+3 (TRT)

Yaylacık is a village in the Ardahan District, Ardahan Province, Turkey. Its population is 208 (2021).
