= Tazeköy, Ardahan =

Tazeköy
- Village
- Location within Turkey
- Coordinates: 41°01′50″N 42°51′40″E
- Country: Turkey
- Province: Ardahan
- District: Ardahan
- Population (2021): 412
- Time zone: UTC+3 (TRT)

Tazeköy is a village in the Ardahan District, Ardahan Province, Turkey. Its population is 412 (2021).
