= Bayramoğlu, Ardahan =

Bayramoğlu
- Village
- Location within Turkey
- Coordinates: 40°58′55″N 42°57′35″E
- Country: Turkey
- Province: Ardahan
- District: Ardahan
- Population (2021): 489
- Time zone: UTC+3 (TRT)

Bayramoğlu (Kurdish: Kora) is a village in the Ardahan District, Ardahan Province, Turkey. The village is populated by Kurds and had a population of 489 in 2021.

== Recognition and branding ==
Since 1998, the village has gained recognition through various media outlets and internet platforms, becoming known as a "brand village". The Ardahan-based journalist and writer Mehmet Ali Arslan played a significant role in promoting the village and other nearby settlements on the internet.

=== Culture and events ===
In 2018, extensive celebrations were held in the village to mark the 20th anniversary of its recognition. As part of the celebrations, logos and flags representing the village were hung on the historical Kora Castle. Various cultural events lasting for days were organized with the support and participation of neighboring villages.
