= Aşağıaydere, Hanak =

Aşağıaydere
- Village
- Location within Turkey
- Coordinates: 41°21′N 42°43′E
- Country: Turkey
- Province: Ardahan
- District: Hanak
- Population (2021): 143
- Time zone: UTC+3 (TRT)

Aşağıaydere is a village in the Hanak District, Ardahan Province, Turkey. Its population is 143 (2021).
