= Çamlıçatak =

- Village
- Location within Turkey
- Coordinates: 41°07′30″N 42°50′00″E
- Country: Turkey
- Province: Ardahan
- District: Ardahan
- Elevation: 1,800 m (5,900 ft)
- Population (2021): 882
- Time zone: UTC+3 (TRT)
- Postal code: 75000
- Area code: 0478

Çamlıçatak is a village in the Ardahan District, Ardahan Province, Turkey. Its population is 882 (2021). It is situated in the high plateau of Eastern Anatolia. The distance to Ardahan city is 12 kilometres (7.5 mi).
