= Çağlayık, Ardahan =

Village in Ardahan Province, Turkey

Çağlayık
- Village
- Location within Turkey
- Coordinates: 41°02′40″N 42°55′55″E
- Country: Turkey
- Province: Ardahan
- District: Ardahan
- Population (2021): 294
- Time zone: UTC+3 (TRT)

Çağlayık is a village in the Ardahan District, Ardahan Province, Turkey. The village is populated by Kurds and had a population of 294 in 2021.
