= Sugöze, Ardahan =

Sugöze
- Village
- Location within Turkey
- Coordinates: 41°05′58″N 42°39′45″E
- Country: Turkey
- Province: Ardahan
- District: Ardahan
- Population (2021): 207
- Time zone: UTC+3 (TRT)

Sugöze is a village in the Ardahan District, Ardahan Province, Turkey. Its population is 207 (2021).

The former name of the villages of Sugöze and Ağzıpek is "Chinchrobi". The Georgian place name Chinchrobi (Georgian: ჭინჭრობი) refers to places where nettles grow. In old records, the village of Sugöze is referred to first as "Lower Chinchrobi" or "Cincrob-i Süfla" (جنجروب سفلا), then as "Little Chinchrobi" or "Küçük Cincrob" (كوچك جنجروب).

The walls of the Lower Chinchrobi Church (Georgian: ქვემო ჭინჭრობის ეკლესია), dating back to the period when Christians lived in the village of Sugöze, have survived to the present day.
