= Alagöz, Ardahan =

Village in Ardahan Province, Turkey

Alagöz
- Village
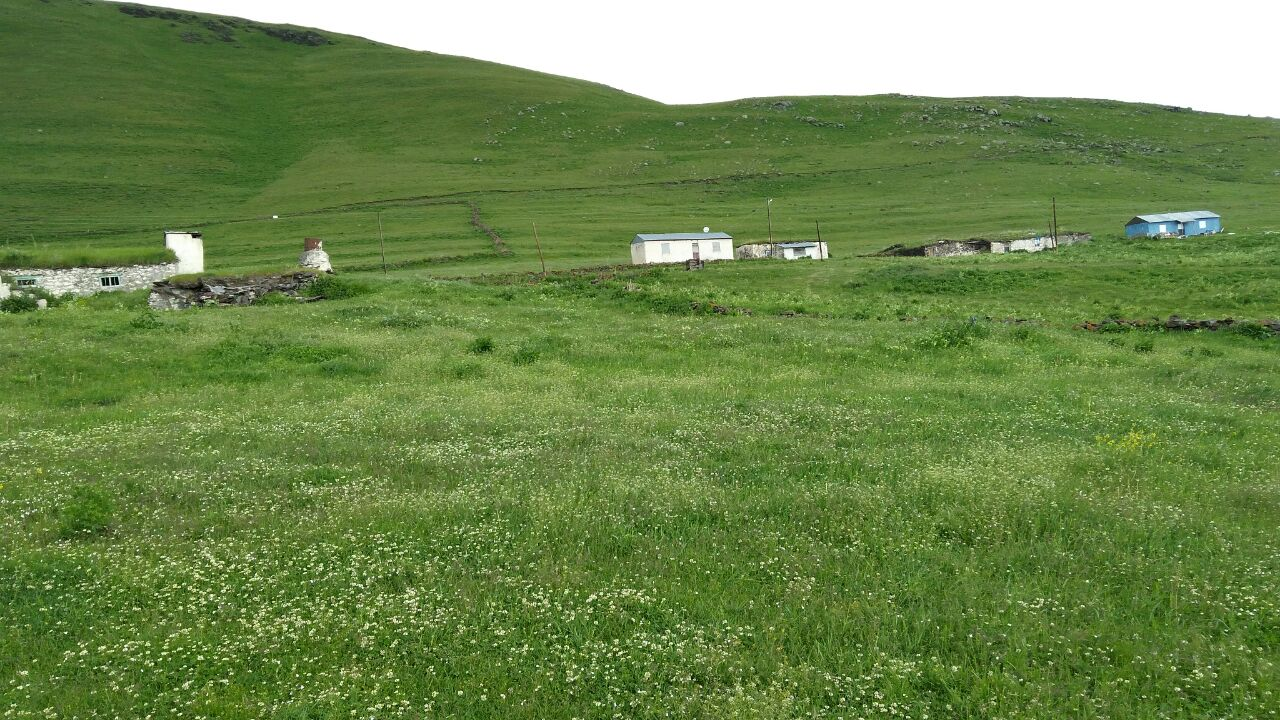

- Location within Turkey
- Coordinates: 41°02′10″N 42°41′55″E
- Country: Turkey
- Province: Ardahan
- District: Ardahan
- Population (2021): 261
- Time zone: UTC+3 (TRT)

Alagöz is a village in the Ardahan District, Ardahan Province, Turkey. Its population is 261 (2021). The village is populated by Karapapakhs.
