= Börk, Hanak =

Börk
- Village
- Location within Turkey
- Coordinates: 41°12′N 42°58′E
- Country: Turkey
- Province: Ardahan
- District: Hanak
- Population (2021): 181
- Time zone: UTC+3 (TRT)

Börk is a village in the Hanak District, Ardahan Province, Turkey. Its population is 181 (2021).

The historical name of the village of Börk is Bergi. Bergi (ბერგი) means "dig" in the Megrel and Laz languages. However, the name of the village was written as Bork or Börk (بورك) in the Ottoman land-survey register (mufassal defter) of 1595.
