= Kartalpınar, Ardahan =

Kartalpınar
- Village
- Location within Turkey
- Coordinates: 41°08′55″N 42°44′45″E
- Country: Turkey
- Province: Ardahan
- District: Ardahan
- Population (2021): 247
- Time zone: UTC+3 (TRT)

Kartalpınar is a village in the Ardahan District, Ardahan Province, Turkey. Its population is 247 (2021).

The historical name of Kartalpınar is known as Fakhrel. However, the village's name is incorrectly written in Ottoman land-survey register (mufassal defter), and it is believed that its historical name was either "Kvakrili" (ქვაყრილი) or "Kvakhvreli" (ქვახვრელი). In fact, the names of the heads of households in Ottoman land-survey register (mufassal defter) of 1595 also show that the village was a Georgian settlement.

In the village of Kartalpınar the ruins of a 10th-century Georgian church are located at a place called "Engenik".
