= Akyaka, Ardahan =

Akyaka
- Village
- Location within Turkey
- Coordinates: 41°05′10″N 42°34′45″E
- Country: Turkey
- Province: Ardahan
- District: Ardahan
- Population (2021): 219
- Time zone: UTC+3 (TRT)

Akyaka is a village in the Ardahan District, Ardahan Province, Turkey. As of 2021, its population was 219.
