= Hacıali, Ardahan =

Village in Ardahan Province, Turkey

Hacıali
- Village
- Location within Turkey
- Coordinates: 40°56′35″N 42°55′05″E
- Country: Turkey
- Province: Ardahan
- District: Ardahan
- Population (2021): 548
- Time zone: UTC+3 (TRT)

Hacıali (Kurdish: Hecîelî) is a village in the Ardahan District, Ardahan Province, Turkey. The village is populated by Kurds and had a population of 548 in 2021.
