= Ovapınar, Ardahan =

Ovapınar
- Village
- Location within Turkey
- Coordinates: 41°04′20″N 42°36′25″E
- Country: Turkey
- Province: Ardahan
- District: Ardahan
- Population (2021): 265
- Time zone: UTC+3 (TRT)

Ovapınar is a village in the Ardahan District, Ardahan Province, Turkey. Its population is 265 (2021). The village is populated by Karapapakhs and Turks.
