= Sevimli, Hanak =

Sevimli
- Village
- Location within Turkey
- Coordinates: 41.1616°N 42.9855°E
- Country: Turkey
- Province: Ardahan
- District: Hanak
- Population (2021): 257
- Time zone: UTC+3 (TRT)

Sevimli is a village in the Hanak District, Ardahan Province, Turkey. Its population is 257 (2021).
