= Çetinsu, Ardahan =

Çetinsu
- Village
- Location within Turkey
- Coordinates: 41°08′15″N 42°32′05″E
- Country: Turkey
- Province: Ardahan
- District: Ardahan
- Population (2021): 300
- Time zone: UTC+3 (TRT)

Çetinsu is a village in the Ardahan District, Ardahan Province, Turkey. Its population is 300 (2021).
