= Ardıçdere, Ardahan =

Ardıçdere
- Village
- Location within Turkey
- Coordinates: 41°05′57″N 42°28′16″E
- Country: Turkey
- Province: Ardahan
- District: Ardahan
- Population (2021): 154
- Time zone: UTC+3 (TRT)

Ardıçdere is a village in the Ardahan District, Ardahan Province, Turkey. Its population is 154 (2021).
