= Binbaşak, Hanak =

Binbaşak
- Village
- Location within Turkey
- Coordinates: 41°12′N 43°02′E
- Country: Turkey
- Province: Ardahan
- District: Hanak
- Population (2021): 240
- Time zone: UTC+3 (TRT)

Binbaşak is a village in the Hanak District, Ardahan Province, Turkey. Its population is 240 (2021).
