= Kayabeyi, Çıldır =

Kayabeyi
- Village
- Location within Turkey
- Coordinates: 41°12′N 43°08′E
- Country: Turkey
- Province: Ardahan
- District: Çıldır
- Population (2021): 153
- Time zone: UTC+3 (TRT)

Kayabeyi, formerly Çayis, is a village in the Çıldır District, Ardahan Province, Turkey. Its population is 153 (2021). The village is populated by Karapapakhs and Turks. It contains the Chaisi Church.
