= İncedere, Hanak =

İncedere
- Village
- Location within Turkey
- Coordinates: 41.2432°N 42.7640°E
- Country: Turkey
- Province: Ardahan
- District: Hanak
- Population (2021): 349
- Time zone: UTC+3 (TRT)

İncedere is a village in the Hanak District, Ardahan Province, Turkey. Its population is 349 (2021). The village is populated by Turkmens.
