= Bağdaşen =

Bağdaşen Kinzodamal
- Village
- Location within Turkey
- Coordinates: 41°03′35″N 42°23′25″E
- Country: Turkey
- Province: Ardahan
- District: Ardahan
- Elevation: 2,050 m (6,730 ft)
- Time zone: UTC+3 (TRT)
- Postal code: 75000
- Area code: 0478

Bağdaşen (Kinzodamal) is a village in the western part of the Ardahan District, Ardahan Province, Turkey. Its population is 910 (2021). The distance to Ardahan is about 30 kilometres (19 mi).
