= Uzunova, Ardahan =

Uzunova
- Village
- Location within Turkey
- Coordinates: 41°05′10″N 42°30′10″E
- Country: Turkey
- Province: Ardahan
- District: Ardahan
- Population (2021): 30
- Time zone: UTC+3 (TRT)

Uzunova is a village in the Ardahan District, Ardahan Province, Turkey. Its population is 30 (2021).
