= Gölgeli, Ardahan =

Village in Ardahan Province, Turkey

Gölgeli
- Village
- Location within Turkey
- Coordinates: 41°02′40″N 42°51′40″E
- Country: Turkey
- Province: Ardahan
- District: Ardahan
- Population (2021): 255
- Time zone: UTC+3 (TRT)

Gölgeli is a village in the Ardahan District, Ardahan Province, Turkey. The village is populated by Kurds and had a population of 255 in 2021.
