= İncedere, Şiran =

İncedere
- Village
- Location within Turkey
- Coordinates: 40.1845°N 38.8882°E
- Country: Turkey
- Province: Gümüşhane
- District: Şiran
- Population (2022): 92
- Time zone: UTC+3 (TRT)

İncedere is a village in the Şiran District, Gümüşhane Province, Turkey. Its population is 92 (2022).
