= Yalnızçam, Ardahan =

Yalnızçam
- Village
- Location within Turkey
- Coordinates: 41°04′00″N 42°30′10″E
- Country: Turkey
- Province: Ardahan
- District: Ardahan
- Population (2021): 369
- Time zone: UTC+3 (TRT)

Yalnızçam is a village in the Ardahan District, Ardahan Province, Turkey. Its population is 369 (2021).

The historical name of Yalnızçam village is Sindisgomi (სინდისგომი). The Georgian word "gomi" (გომი) means "barn".

The settlement area of Almona, a vanished Georgian village, is within the borders of Yalnızçam village.
