= Taşlıdere, Ardahan =

Village in Ardahan Province, Turkey

Taşlıdere
- Village
- Location within Turkey
- Coordinates: 41°04′00″N 42°50′45″E
- Country: Turkey
- Province: Ardahan
- District: Ardahan
- Population (2021): 477
- Time zone: UTC+3 (TRT)

Taşlıdere (Kurdish: Pangîs) is a village in the Ardahan District, Ardahan Province, Turkey. The village is populated by Kurds and had a population of 477 in 2021.
