= Artaani (historical region) =

Historical Georgian province

Artaani

City Church or monastery	Cathedral Castle or fortress

Artaani is a historical Georgian province on the territory of modern Turkey's Ardahan Province. It is traditionally divided in two sub-provinces of Lower Artaani and Upper Artaani respectively corresponding to left and right banks of Mtkvari river. According to the medieval chronicler Leonti Mroveli the fortified city of Artaani was built by legendary ethnarch Javakhos. Later Pharnavaz I of Iberia founded the Saeristavo of Tsunda which came to include Artaani among with the provinces of Kola and Erusheti. During the 12th and 13th centuries the dukes of Artaani had the title of Monapire (ruler of the borderlands, Margrave). Later part of Samtskhe-Saatabago Artaani was annexed by the Ottomans in the 16th century. Divided into two parts, lesser part of the region entered Kars Eyalet while the greater part entered Childir Eyalet. Parakani was the major city of Greater Artaani at that time. After the Russo-Turkish war of 1877–1878 Artaani became part of the Russian Empire in accordance with the treaty of San Stefano. In 1918 it was occupied by Turkey but in 1919 Georgian forces led by general Giorgi Kvinitadze took its control. Kars treaty of 1921 ceded Artaani to Turkey after the sovietization of Georgia.
