= Höçvan Hasköy, Ardahan =

Village in Ardahan Province, Turkey

Höçvan Hasköy
- Village
- Location within Turkey
- Coordinates: 40.992°N 42.883°E
- Country: Turkey
- Province: Ardahan
- District: Ardahan
- Population (2021): 667
- Time zone: UTC+3 (TRT)

Höçvan Hasköy (Kurdish: Xoçvan, Xas) is a village in the Ardahan District, Ardahan Province, Turkey. The village is populated by Kurds and had a population of 667 in 2021.
