= Hanak =

- Municipality
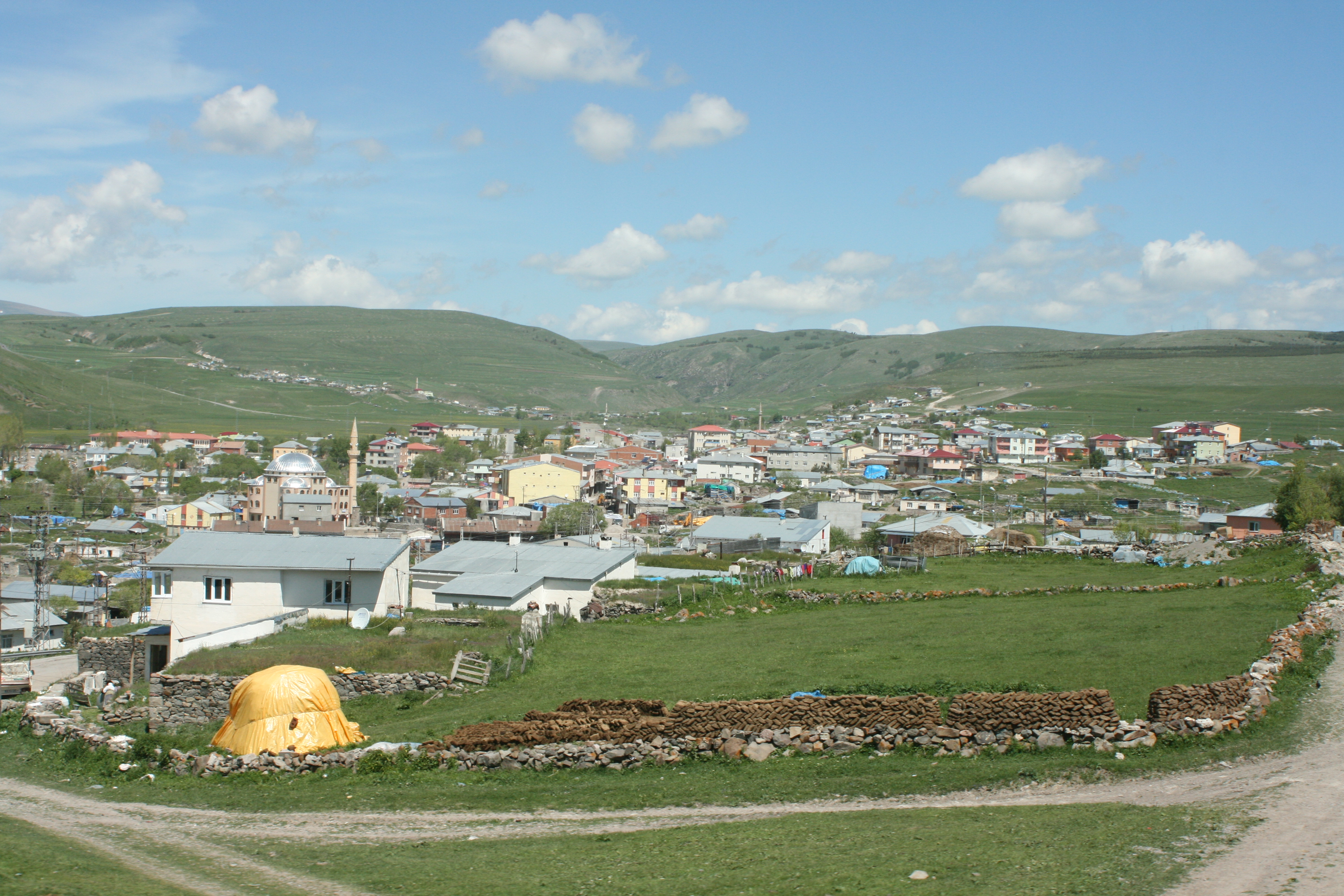

- Location within Turkey
- Coordinates: 41°14′10″N 42°50′50″E
- Country: Turkey
- Province: Ardahan
- District: Hanak

Government
  - Mayor: Erdal Kurukaya (AKP)
- Population (2021): 2,880
- Time zone: UTC+3 (TRT)
- Postal code: 75900
- Website: www.hanak.bel.tr

Hanak is a town in Ardahan Province of Turkey, on the road from Ardahan to Posof. It is the seat of Çıldır District. Its population is 2,880 (2021). The town is populated by Turks.

== See also ==
- Hanák
- Hanakia
