= Hasköy, Ardahan =

Hasköy
- Village
- Location within Turkey
- Coordinates: 41°04′15″N 42°26′20″E
- Country: Turkey
- Province: Ardahan
- District: Ardahan
- Population (2021): 295
- Time zone: UTC+3 (TRT)

Hasköy is a village in the Ardahan District, Ardahan Province, Turkey. Its population is 295 (2021).
