= Ardahan District =

District of Ardahan Province, Turkey

- District
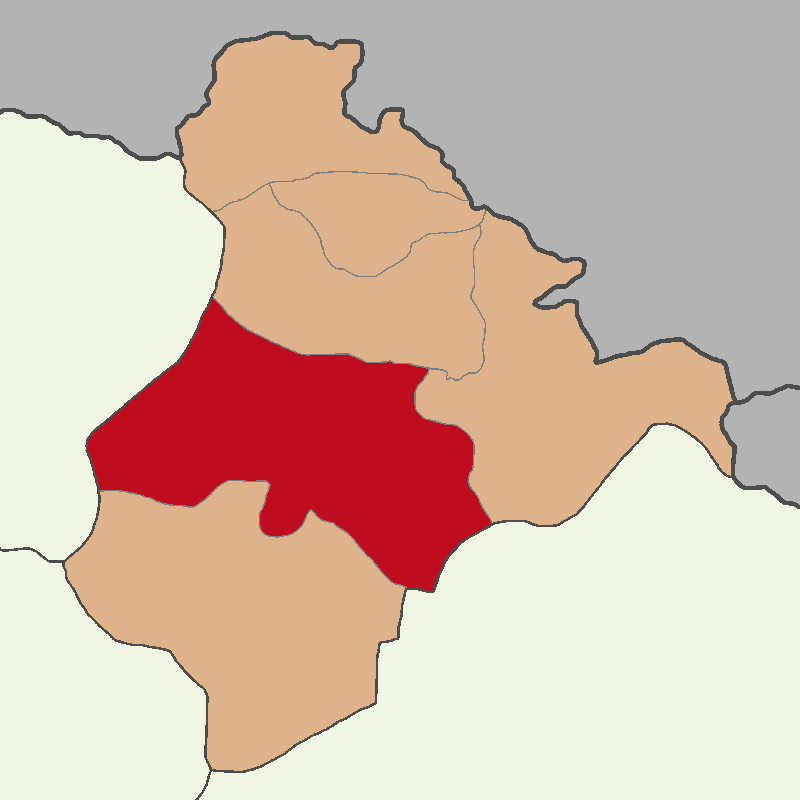
- Map showing Ardahan District in Ardahan Province

- Location in Turkey
- Coordinates: 41°07′N 42°42′E
- Country: Turkey
- Province: Ardahan
- Seat: Ardahan
- Area: 1,261 km^{2} (487 sq mi)
- Population (2021): 42,023
  - Density: 33/km^{2} (86/sq mi)
- Time zone: UTC+3 (TRT)

Ardahan District (also: Merkez, meaning "central") is a district of Ardahan Province of Turkey. Its seat is the town Ardahan. Its area is 1,261 km^{2}, and its population is 42,023 (2021).

== Composition ==
There is one municipality in Ardahan District:

- Ardahan

There are 62 villages in Ardahan District:

- Açıkyazı
- Ağaçlı
- Ağzıpek
- Akyaka
- Alagöz
- Altaş
- Ardıçdere
- Aşağıkurtoğlu
- Bağdaşen
- Balıkçılar
- Bayramoğlu
- Beşiktaş
- Binbaşar
- Büyüksütlüce
- Çağlayık
- Çalabaş
- Çamlıçatak
- Çataldere
- Çatalköprü
- Çeğilli
- Çetinsu
- Çimenkaya
- Dağcı
- Dağevi
- Dedegül
- Değirmenli
- Derindere
- Edegül
- Gölgeli
- Güzçimeni
- Güzelyurt
- Hacıali
- Hasköy
- Höçvan Hasköy
- Kartalpınar
- Kazlıköy
- Kıraç
- Kocaköy
- Köprücük
- Küçüksütlüce
- Lehimli
- Meşedibi
- Nebioğlu
- Ölçek
- Ömerağa
- Ortageçit
- Otbiçen
- Ovapınar
- Samanbeyli
- Sarıyamaç
- Sugöze
- Sulakyurt
- Taşlıdere
- Tazeköy
- Tepeler
- Tepesuyu
- Tunçoluk
- Uzunova
- Yalnızçam
- Yaylacık
- Yokuşdibi
- Yukarıkurtoğlu
