= Çatalköprü, Ardahan =

Çatalköprü
- Village
- Location within Turkey
- Coordinates: 41°04′20″N 42°28′30″E
- Country: Turkey
- Province: Ardahan
- District: Ardahan
- Population (2022): 218
- Time zone: UTC+3 (TRT)

Çatalköprü is a village in the Ardahan District, Ardahan Province, Turkey. Its population is 218 (2022).

== History ==
There is no information regarding the establishment of the village, which is located within the historical region of Tao-Klarceti. The area in which Çatalköprü is located passed between the Kingdom of Georgia and the Seljuk Turks through the Middle Ages, until it came under Ottoman rule, under which it remained until the 20th century. It was considered a large village, containing 59 families, by 1595. Although under Ottoman rule, Çatalköprü remained culturally Georgian at this time. However, a 1723 census records that the village was owned by brothers named Mehmed, Mustafa, Hüseyin, and Osman, suggesting that by this point it had become Islamified or, at least, had come under direct Muslim ownership.

The village was occupied by the Russians during the 1877-1878 Russo-Turkish War, during which time the village consisted of roughly 40 households. An 1888 census records a population of 487, all of whom it records as Turkish. By 1917, the Georgian researcher Konstantine Martvileli, on his visit to the Ardahan region, found the village to have been abandoned. Following the collapse of the Russian Empire, the village came within the territory of the short-lived Democratic Republic of Georgia; in the wake of the Red Army's invasion of Georgia, the Treaty of Moscow, signed on March 16, 1921, included the village within the borders of Turkey. A village with the name of Çatalköprü had been re-established by 1933.

== Population ==
Historical population
Year	Pop.	±% p.a.
1985	969	—
1990	732	−5.46%
1997	517	−4.85%
2007	333	−4.30%
2012	314	−1.17%
2017	269	−3.05%
2022	218	−4.12%
Source: 1985 census, 1990 census, 1997 census and TÜIK (2007-2022)
