= Ardahan =

- Municipality
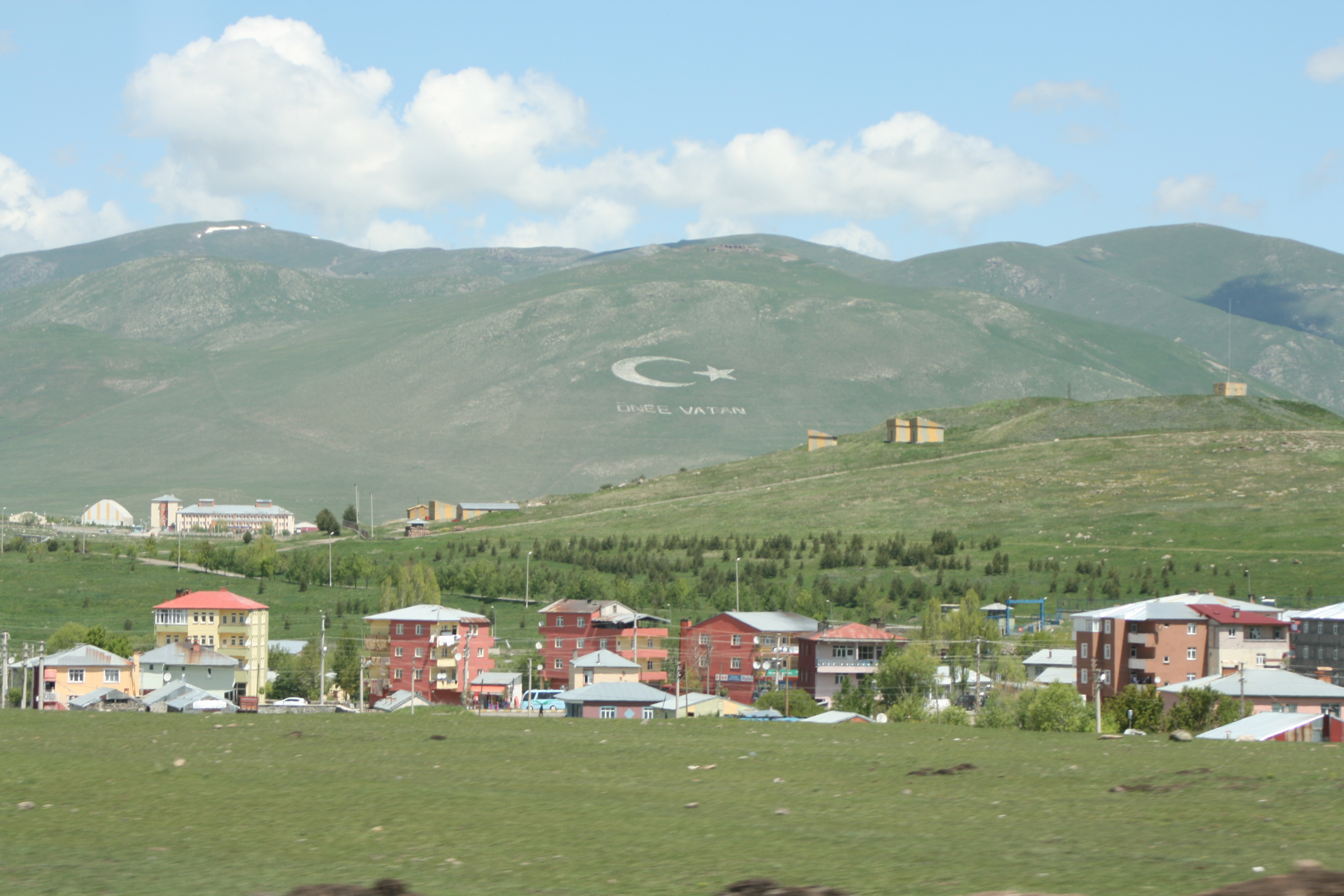

- Coat of arms

- Location within Turkey
- Coordinates: 41°06′40″N 42°42′08″E
- Country: Turkey
- Province: Ardahan
- District: Ardahan

Government
  - Mayor: Faruk Demir (CHP)
- Elevation: 1,811 m (5,942 ft)
- Population (2021): 22,927
- Time zone: UTC+3 (TRT)
- Postal code: 75000
- Website: www.ardahan.bel.tr

Ardahan (Georgian: არტაანი, romanized: art'aani; Kurdish: Erdêxan, Armenian: Արդահան, romanized: Ardahan; Russian: Ардаган) is a city in northeastern Turkey, near the Georgian border. It is the seat of Ardahan Province and Ardahan District. Its population is 22,927 (2021).

== History ==
=== Ancient and medieval ===
Ardahan was historically located in the region of Gogarene (Gugark), which Strabo calls a part of the Armenia that was taken away from the Kingdom of Iberia. In the Middle Ages Ardahan served as an important transit point for goods arriving from the Abbasid Caliphate and departing to the regions around the Black Sea. During the 8th to 10th centuries the region was in hands of the Bagrationi princes of Tao-Klarjeti under the name of Artaani, and later part of Kingdom of Georgia between 11th to 15th centuries. According to the Arab historian Yahya of Antioch, the Byzantines razed Ardahan and slaughtered its population in 1021.

The Mongols took hold of the city in the 1230s but the Georgian princes of Samtskhe were able to recapture it in 1266. In 1555, by the Peace of Amasya, the western part of the principality of Samtskhe was annexed by the Ottoman Empire, and Ardahan was included into the sanjak of Ardahan (an overall part of the vilayet of Akhaltsikhe). The Ottomans turned Ardahan into a formidable fortress-town. In the 1640s the Ottoman traveler Evliya Çelebi visited Ardahan and gave the following description: "The fortress of Ardahan sits atop an inaccessible cliff. It is square-shaped and sturdy... This fortress has a cold climate and, because of this, there are no gardens or orchards. Fruits arrive from the fortress at Ajara and Tortum."

=== Modern ===
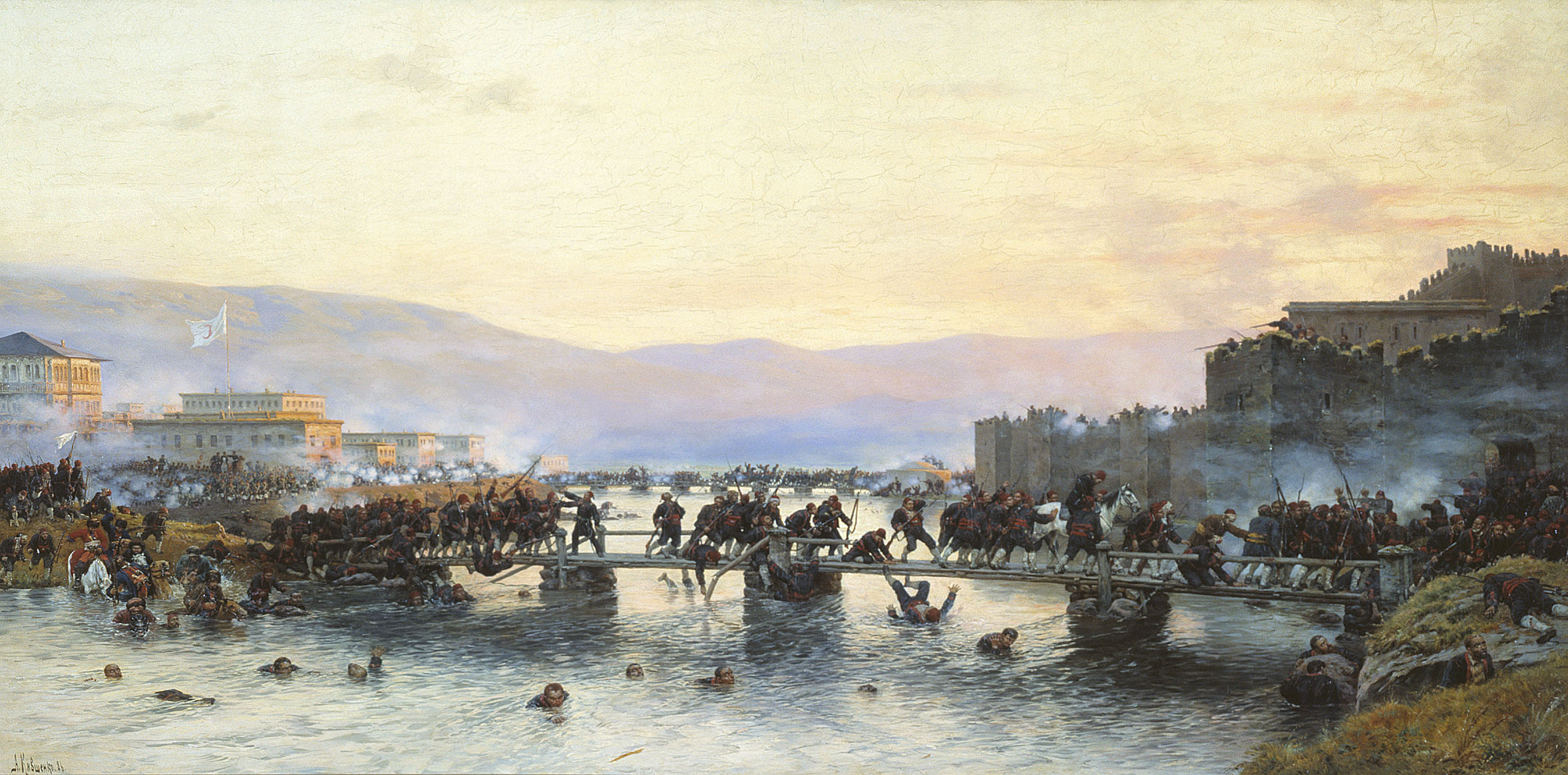
The storming of the Ardahan fortress by the Russian troops on 5 May 1877. A painting by Aleksey Kivshenko.

Before 1829 Ardahan was recorded to have had 400 households, the majority of them Armenian. Many of them later emigrated to the Russian Empire in the early 19th century. During the Russo-Turkish War (1828–1829) it was an important road junction connecting the border fortress of Akhaltsikhe to the Kars-Erzerum road. The town passed into the hands of Russia following the 1877-1878 Russo-Turkish War and was made a part of the Ardahan Okrug of the Kars Oblast. The majority of the town was made up of Armenians, while other ethnic groups included Georgians, Pontic Greeks (here usually called Caucasus Greeks), Caucasus Jews, Russians, Kurds, Ossetians, and Yazidis. A Polish community was also established, with the majority of Poles being sent to Ardahan from the Russian Partition of Poland after being conscripted to the Russian Army. The town flourished economically under Russian rule, exporting fruits, smoked lamb meat, wheat and wood. New roads were constructed, linking Ardahan to Akhalkalak, Kars, and Oltu. On 25 December 1914, in the early months of the First World War, the Ottoman Army occupied Ardahan and massacred many of its Armenians, Pontic Greeks, and Georgians. The Russians, with the help of Armenian and Pontic Greek militias, captured the town on January 3, 1915, allowing some of the original inhabitants who had fled to return.

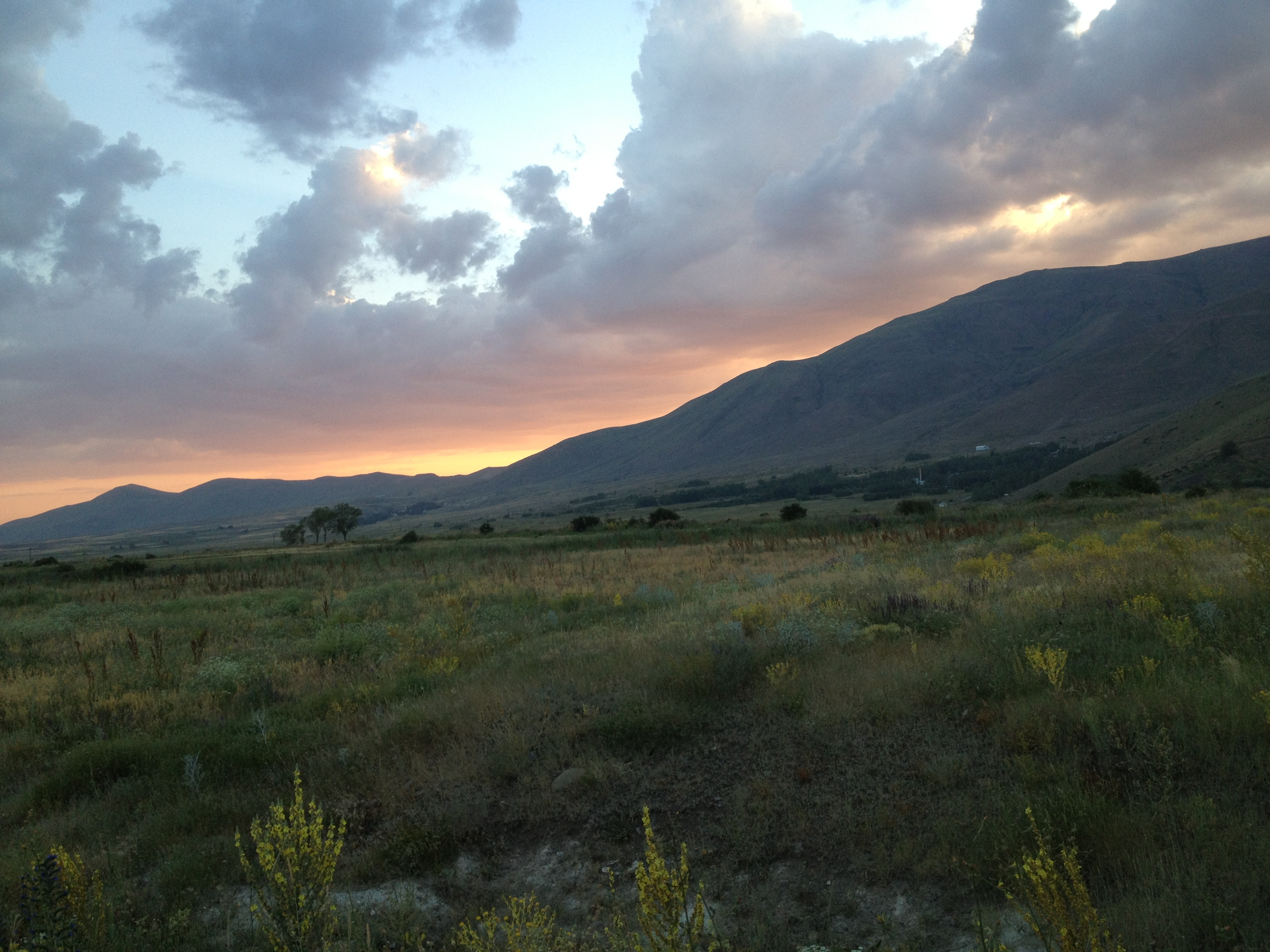
Rural Ardahan

As Russian forces withdrew from the front following the October Revolution, a small Armenian volunteer force took up positions to defend the town from the approaching Ottoman Army. On March 6, 1918, the Ottoman army, along with the help of the town's Muslims, overwhelmed Ardahan's Armenian garrison and retook the town. Ardahan was occupied by Democratic Republic of Georgia on 20 April 1919. When the Turkish Nationalists captured Ardahan on 23 February 1921, the town's remaining Armenians, Pontic Greeks, and Georgians fled to Armenia, northern Greece, and Georgia. The Treaty of Moscow, signed the following year between the Soviets and the Ankara Government, confirmed Ardahan as a part of Turkish territory.

In 1986 a brief description of the fortress was published. The original late antique/medieval walls of Ardahan Kalesi were extensively rebuilt several times and in the 19th they were adapted to accommodate small cannons.

In 1960, Ardahan's population stood at 7,228 and was populated by both Kurds and Turks.

== Demographics ==
Year	Total	Ethnic groups
1886	778	Turks 403 (51.8%), Russians 172 (22.1%), Armenians 141 (18.1%), Greeks 48 (6.2%), Kurds 7 (0.9%)
1897	4,142	Russians 1,331 (32.1%), Armenians 1,315 (31.7%), Turks 746 (18%), Poles 206 (5%)
1916	3,167	Armenians 1,708 (53.9%), Sunni Muslims 778 (24.6%), Roma 361 (11.4%), Russians 270 (8.5%)
1960	7,228	
1970	13,399	
1980	14,912	
1990	16,761	
2000	17,274	
2010	16,251	

== Geography ==
Ardahan is situated in northeastern Turkey, close to the border with Georgia. It lies on the upper course of the river Kura, south of the Yalnızçam Mountains. The town consists of 7 quarters: Halilefendi, Karagöl, Kaptanpaşa, Yenimahalle, Gürçayir, Atatürk and Inönü.

=== Climate ===
Ardahan has a humid continental climate (Köppen: Dfb, Trewartha: Dclc), bordering on a subarctic climate (Köppen: Dfc, Trewartha: Eclc) on higher elevations, with brief, mild summers and very cold winters.

Summers are mild to warm during daytime, but turn colder nocturnally. Because of this, temperatures below freezing have been recorded every month of the year. It is also frequently rainy most of the year, especially in spring and summer.

Winters are quite snowy with snow cover lasting from late October to mid April. Although it does snow in September and May, accumulating snowfall is rare. On rarer occasions, it has also snowed in summer months, such as the snowfall in August 2013. The highest recorded snow thickness was 113 cm (44.5 inches) on 30 January 1968.

Highest recorded temperature:35.0 °C (95.0 °F) on 29 August 1998
Lowest recorded temperature: −39.8 °C (−39.6 °F) on 21 January 1972

Climate data for Ardahan (1991–2020, extremes 1958–2023)
Month	Jan	Feb	Mar	Apr	May	Jun	Jul	Aug	Sep	Oct	Nov	Dec	Year
Record high °C (°F)	11.1 (52.0)	11.0 (51.8)	18.4 (65.1)	25.0 (77.0)	28.9 (84.0)	33.1 (91.6)	34.3 (93.7)	35.0 (95.0)	32.1 (89.8)	26.0 (78.8)	18.7 (65.7)	14.3 (57.7)	35.0 (95.0)
Mean daily maximum °C (°F)	−4.4 (24.1)	−2.7 (27.1)	3.6 (38.5)	11.1 (52.0)	16.4 (61.5)	20.8 (69.4)	24.3 (75.7)	25.2 (77.4)	21.2 (70.2)	15.2 (59.4)	6.7 (44.1)	−1.5 (29.3)	11.3 (52.3)
Daily mean °C (°F)	−10.3 (13.5)	−9.1 (15.6)	−2.3 (27.9)	4.7 (40.5)	9.6 (49.3)	13.3 (55.9)	16.4 (61.5)	16.7 (62.1)	12.5 (54.5)	7.2 (45.0)	−0.1 (31.8)	−7.3 (18.9)	4.3 (39.7)
Mean daily minimum °C (°F)	−15.5 (4.1)	−14.6 (5.7)	−7.5 (18.5)	−0.8 (30.6)	3.6 (38.5)	6.5 (43.7)	9.4 (48.9)	9.3 (48.7)	4.9 (40.8)	0.7 (33.3)	−5.4 (22.3)	−12.1 (10.2)	−1.8 (28.8)
Record low °C (°F)	−39.8 (−39.6)	−38.7 (−37.7)	−33.2 (−27.8)	−19.0 (−2.2)	−8.5 (16.7)	−4.5 (23.9)	−2.2 (28.0)	−2.8 (27.0)	−5.8 (21.6)	−15.0 (5.0)	−28.9 (−20.0)	−36.3 (−33.3)	−39.8 (−39.6)
Average precipitation mm (inches)	24.0 (0.94)	21.7 (0.85)	37.0 (1.46)	54.2 (2.13)	85.2 (3.35)	101.7 (4.00)	77.2 (3.04)	64.8 (2.55)	38.9 (1.53)	41.1 (1.62)	29.9 (1.18)	24.7 (0.97)	600.4 (23.64)
Average precipitation days	7.80	7.97	10.33	14.23	17.97	15.50	12.97	12.00	9.47	10.87	7.93	8.03	135.1
Average snowy days	7.5	5.9	8.4	2.5	0.3	0	0	0	0	0.9	3.4	6.4	35.3
Average relative humidity (%)	75.4	75.1	72.6	67.6	68.2	68.6	68.1	65.7	65.2	68.8	72.9	77.3	70.5
Mean monthly sunshine hours	80.6	104.5	155.0	153.0	195.3	234.0	257.3	251.1	213.0	164.3	111.0	77.5	1,996.6
Mean daily sunshine hours	2.6	3.7	5.0	5.1	6.3	7.8	8.3	8.1	7.1	5.3	3.7	2.5	5.5
Source 1: Turkish State Meteorological Service
Source 2: NOAA (humidity 1991-2020), Meteomanz(snow days 2014-2023)

== Media ==
Ardahan has experienced significant growth in digital media since it gained the status of a province by separating from Kars in 1992. Many media platforms operate in the city, and most of them broadcast over the internet. Ardahan's first internet newspaper, founded by Mehmet Ali Arslan, continues to be actively published today as The Ardahan Newspaper. Traditional printed newspapers have largely switched to e-journalism since 2015, keeping up with the process of digitalization, and a few newspapers continue their traditional printed publications in the city. Although the city does not have a satellite or terrestrial media outlet, there are many radio, television and newspaper platforms broadcasting over the internet.

== International relations ==
Twin towns—Sister cities

Ardahan is twinned with:

- (Georgia (country)) Akhaltsikhe, Georgia
- Grozny, Russia

== Notable locals ==
- See Category:People from Ardahan
