= Georgia–Turkey border =

International border

Georgia-Turkey border საქართველო-თურქეთის საზღვარი Gürcistan-Türkiye sınırı
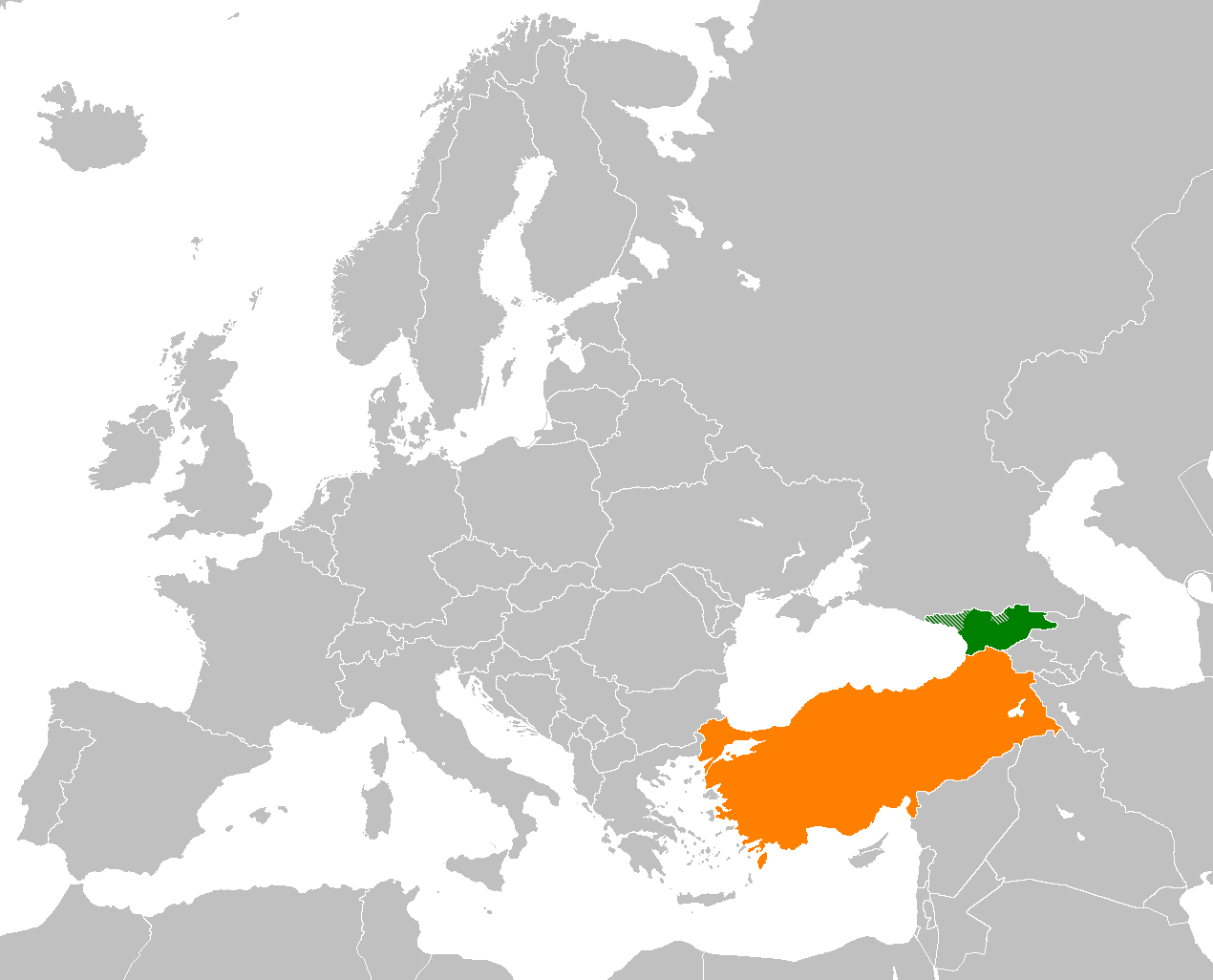

Characteristics
- Entities: Georgia Turkey
- Length: 276 km (171 mi)

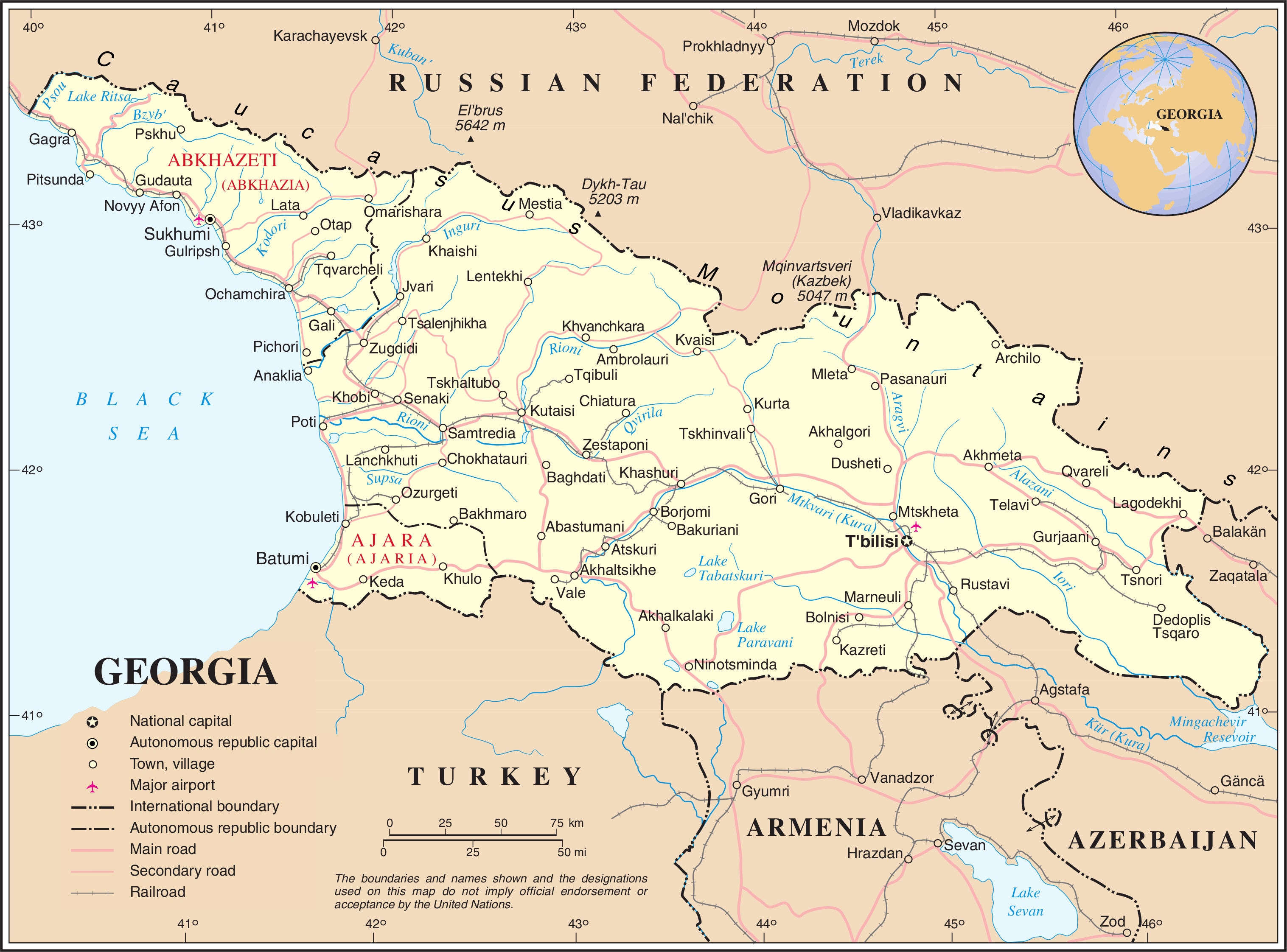
Map of Georgia, with Turkey to the south-west

The Georgia–Turkey border (Georgian: საქართველო–თურქეთის საზღვარი, Turkish: Gürcistan–Türkiye sınırı) is 273 km (170 miles) in length and runs from the Black Sea coast in the west to the tripoint with Armenia in the east. Both Georgia and Turkey are candidate states for EU membership. Turkey is a Nato member; and Georgia in the process of joining the alliance.

== Description ==
The border starts in the west on the Black Sea just south of Sarpi and then proceeds overland eastwards via a series of irregular lines; it then arcs broadly south-eastwards, cutting across Kartsakhi Lake, and down to the Armenian tripoint. The western third of the border is taken up by Georgia's Autonomous Republic of Adjara.

== History ==
During the 19th the Caucasus region was contested between the declining Ottoman Empire, Persia and Russia, which was expanding southwards. Russia had conquered most of Persia's Caucasian lands by 1828 and then turned its attention to the Ottoman Empire. By the 1829 Treaty of Adrianople (ending the Russo-Turkish War of 1828–29) Russia gained most of modern Georgia (including Imeretia, Mingrelia and Guria), with a frontier being delimited situated roughly north of the current Georgia-Turkey boundary.

By the Treaty of San Stefano, ending the Russo-Turkish War (1877–1878), Russia gained further land in what is now eastern Turkey, extending the Ottoman-Russian frontier south-westwards. Russia's gains of Batumi, Kars and Ardahan were confirmed by the Treaty of Berlin (1878), though it was compelled to hand back part of the area around Bayazid (modern Doğubayazıt) and the Eleşkirt valley.

During the First World War Russia invaded the eastern areas of the Ottoman Empire. In the chaos following the 1917 Russian Revolution the new Communist government hastily sought to end its involvement in the war and signed the Treaty of Brest-Litovsk in 1918 with Germany and the Ottoman Empire. By this treaty, Russia handed back the areas gained by the earlier Treaties of San Stefano and Berlin.

Seeking to gain independence from both empires, the peoples of the southern Caucasus had declared the Transcaucasian Democratic Federative Republic in 1918 and started peace talks with the Ottomans. Internal disagreements led to Georgia leaving the federation in May 1918, followed shortly thereafter by Armenia and Azerbaijan. With the Ottomans having invaded the Caucasus and quickly gained ground, the three new republics were compelled to sign the Treaty of Batum on 4 June 1918, by which they recognised the pre-1878 border. Ottoman gains in Armenia were consolidated further by the Treaty of Aleksandropol (1920). Meanwhile, Russia recognised the independence of Georgia via the Treaty of Moscow (1920).

Map of Georgia's historic Tao-Klarjeti region which Turkey gained following the boundary treaty with the Soviets in 1921

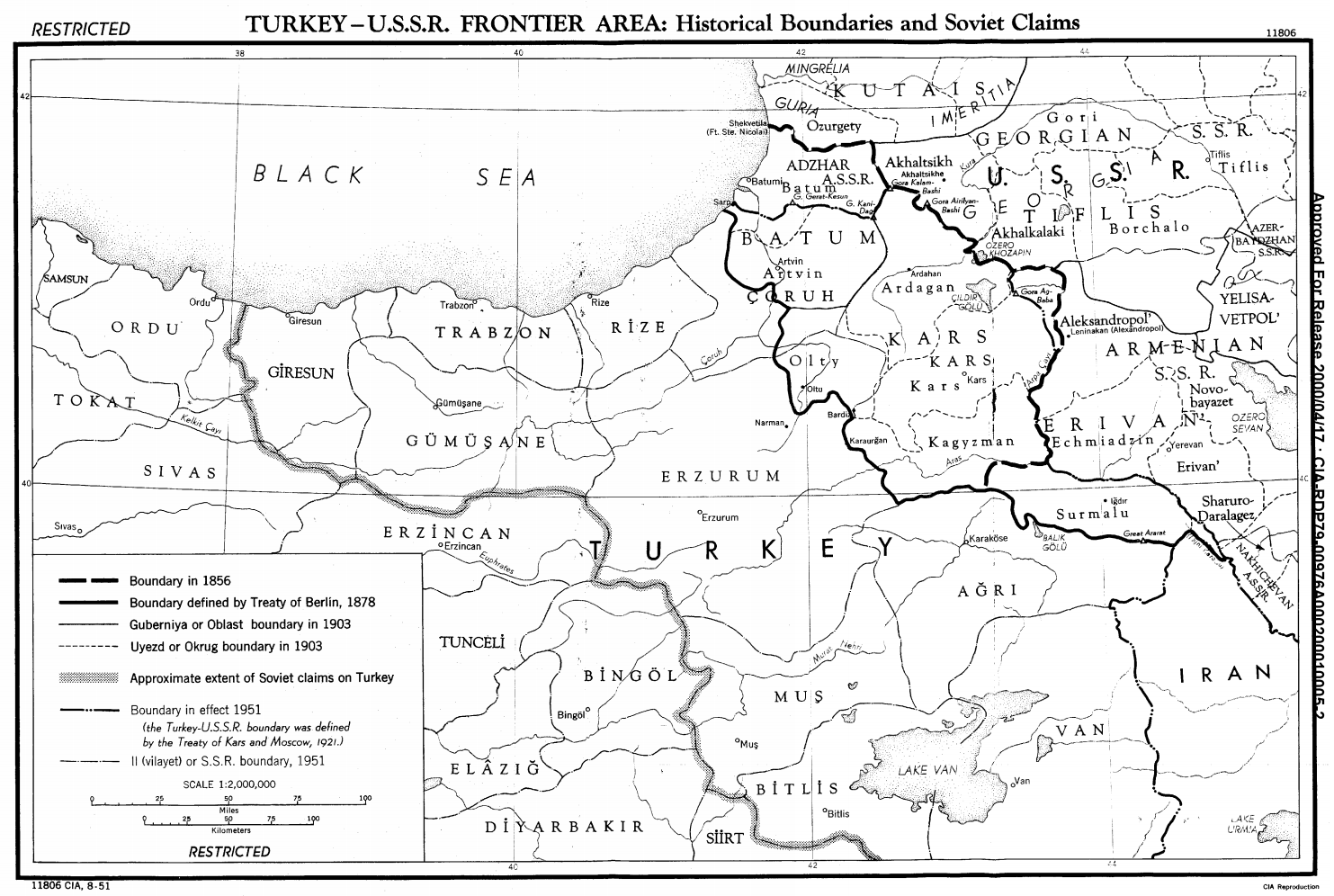
Map of the shifting border between Russia and the Ottoman Empire in the 19th century

With the Ottoman Empire defeated in Europe and Arabia, the Allied powers planned to partition it via the 1920 Treaty of Sèvres. The treaty recognised Georgian and Armenian independence, granting both vast lands in eastern Turkey, with an extended Armenia-Georgia border to be decided at a later date; Georgia was to gain much of Lazistan. Turkish nationalists were outraged at the treaty, contributing to the outbreak the Turkish War of Independence; the Turkish success in this conflict rendered Sèvres obsolete. In 1920 Russia's Red Army had invaded Azerbaijan and Armenia, followed by the Red Army invasion of Georgia in 1921 which ended the independence of Georgia. The Ottomans used the opportunity to invade south-west Georgia, taking Artvin, Ardahan, Batumi and other lands. In order to avoid an all-out Russo-Turkish war the two nations signed the Treaty of Moscow in March 1921, which created a modified Soviet-Ottoman border. However further fighting took place on the ground and the talks stalled; the treaty's provisions were later confirmed by the Treaty of Kars of October 1921, finalising what is the current Georgia–Turkey border. Turkey relinquished its claim to Batumi with the proviso that an autonomous Adjara region be created to protect that area's largely Muslim population. The border was then demarcated on the ground in March 1925 – July 1926 by a joint Soviet-Turkish commission. Turkey's independence had been recognised by the 1923 Treaty of Lausanne.

Georgia was initially incorporated along with Armenia and Azerbaijan in the Transcaucasian SFSR within the USSR, before being split off as the Georgian Soviet Socialist Republic in 1936. The Kars Treaty border remained, despite occasional Soviet protests, notably in 1945, that it should be amended. Turkey, backed by the US, refused to discuss the matter, and the Soviets, seeking better relations with their southern neighbour, dropped the issue.

Following the collapse of the USSR in 1991 Georgia gained independence and inherited its section of the Turkey-USSR border. Turkey recognised Georgian independence on 16 December 1991. The Protocol on Establishment of Diplomatic Relations between the two countries was signed on 21 May 1992 by which their mutual frontier was confirmed.

== Settlements near the border ==
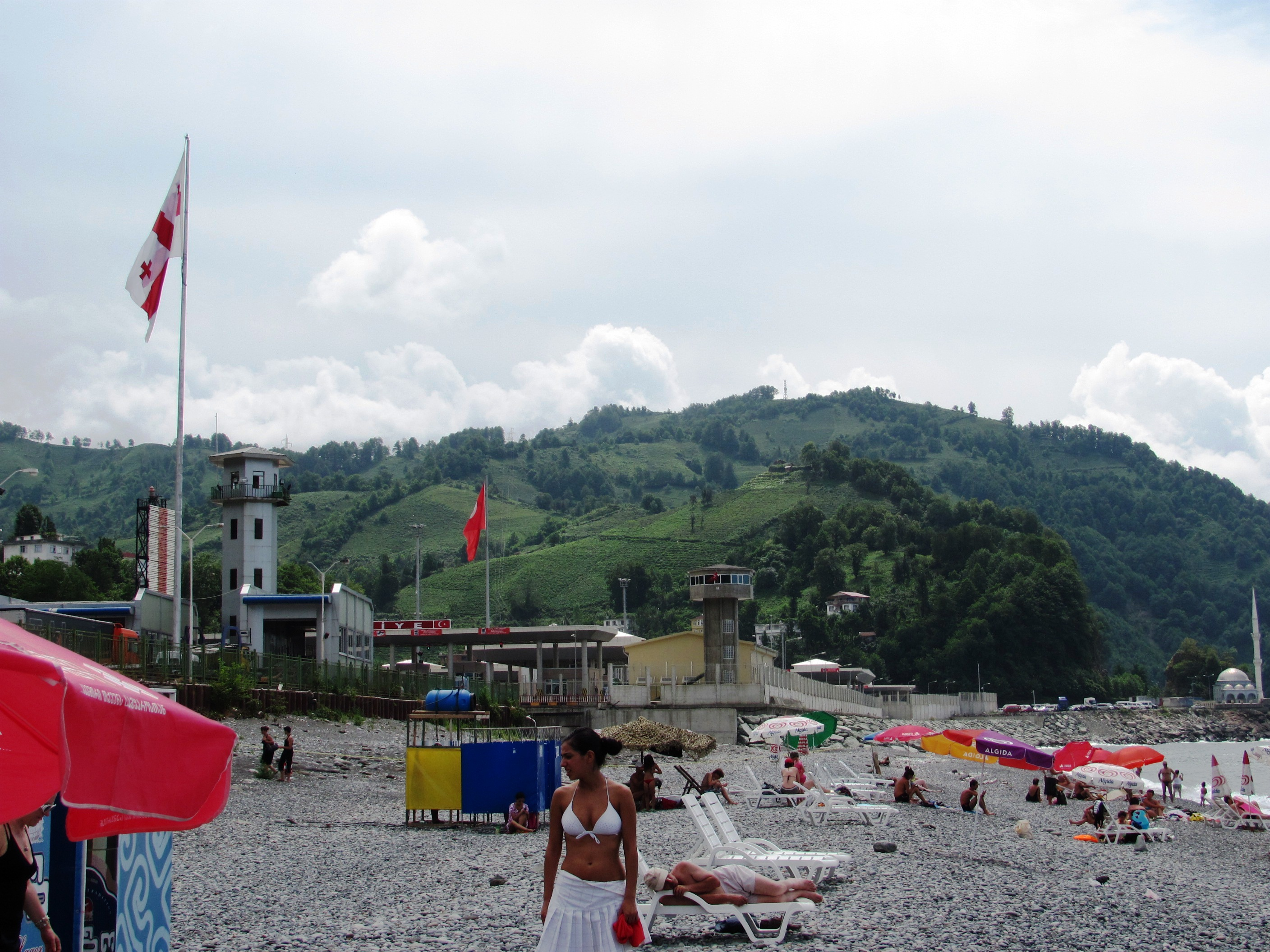
The border crossing at Sarpi

=== Georgia ===
- Sarpi
- Vale
- Kartsakhi

=== Turkey ===
- Hopa
- Borçka
- Muratlı
- Düzenli
- Posof
- Türkgözü
- Çıldır
- Baltalı
- Akçıl
- Övündü

== Crossings ==
There are three crossings along the entire border for vehicular traffic and one for rail traffic.

(Turkey) Turkish checkpoint	Province	(Georgia (country)) Georgian checkpoint	Province	Opened	Route in Turkey	Route in Georgia	Status
Sarp	Artvin	Sarpi	Adjara	31 August 1988	European route E70	S2 highway (Georgia)	Open
Posof-Türkgözü	Ardahan	Vale	Samtskhe–Javakheti	12 July 1995	European route E691	S8 highway (Georgia)	Open
Çıldır-Aktaş	Ardahan	Kartsakhi	Samtskhe–Javakheti	18 October 2015 (Note: The Çıldır-Aktaş – Kartsakhi border crossing opened in 2015, 20 years after this was initially agreed upon. Georgian decrees on border management did not mention Kartsakhi in 1996 through 2008. In 2010 Turkey and Georgia signed a Memorandum of Understanding and a subsequent Agreement to streamline border and customs cooperation which included a Çıldır-Aktaş – Kartsakhi checkpoint. This became a priority within the context of the Baku–Tbilisi–Kars railway project. In following Georgian decrees on border management Kartsakhi was taken up.)		S13 highway (Georgia)	Open
Karakale	Ardahan	Kartsakhi	Samtskhe–Javakheti	30 October 2017 (Note: Since the Baku–Tbilisi–Kars railway opened in 2017, it should become possible in the future to cross the border by passenger train. As of summer 2021, the long anticipated passenger service to and from Turkey did not start. Only long distance cargo trains pass through.)	to Kars	to Tbilisi	Cargo

== See also ==
- Georgia-Turkey relations
