= Ratasani =

Former village in Çıldır, Ardahan, Turkey

Ratasani (Georgian: რატასანი) was a village that has disappeared from the part of the historical Javakheti region remaining in Turkey. The site of the former village is now within the boundaries of Ağıllı (Hamashi) village in Çıldır District of Ardahan Province, Turkey.

== History ==
The historical Javakheti region, where Ratasani was located, is largely within the borders of Georgia today. The Ottoman Empire conquered the region and the village in 1578.

The village of Ratasani is recorded as Radasan (رداسن) in the Ottoman land-survey register (mufassal defter) of 1595. At the time, the village was part of the Kurd Kala (Mgeltsihe) nahiye of the Çıldır liva within the "Vilayet-i Gürcistan". Its population consisted of 11 Christian households, whose heads bore Georgian and Armenian names. Wheat, barley, rye and flaxseed were cultivated in the village, while beekeeping and the raising of pigs and sheep were also practiced. Sergi Jikia, the Georgian Turkologist who published the detailed register, noted that the village was known as Ratasan (Ратасан) in Russian records and was located west of Lake Khozapini, near the village of Petrisi.

Ratasani was also recorded as Radasan (رداسن) in the Ottoman cebe defteri for the Çıldır Eyalet, covering the period from 1694 to 1732, and remained under the same administrative division. In AH 1134 (1721–1722), the village was assigned to a person named Mehmed, and a tax of 9,498 akçe was assessed. Ratasani is not listed as a village in the Çıldır district in the 1886 census, suggesting that it had ceased to exist as a village by that time.
