= Yıldırımtepe, Çıldır =

Yıldırımtepe
- Neighbourhood
- Location in Turkey
- Coordinates: 41°08′N 43°07′E
- Country: Turkey
- Province: Ardahan
- District: Çıldır
- Municipality: Çıldır
- Population (2021): 172
- Time zone: UTC+3 (TRT)

Yıldırımtepe is a neighbourhood of the town Çıldır, Çıldır District, Ardahan Province, Turkey. Its population is 172 (2021). The neighbourhood is populated by Karapapakhs and Turks.

Yıldırımtepe's historical name is Rabati. Rabati (რაბათი), a word borrowed from Arabic into Georgian, was used to refer to the settlement near the castle. This settlement was named after the Kajis Tsikhe castle, which was located near it.
