= Tkemlobi =

Tkemlobi (Georgian: : ტყემლობი) was a village that has disappeared from the part of the historical Javakheti region remaining in Turkey. The settlement area is now within the boundaries of the village of Dirsekkaya in the Çıldır District of Ardahan Province in Turkey.

== History ==
The Georgian place name Tkemlobi (Georgian: ტყემლობი) is derived from the word ‘tkemali’ (ტყემალი), meaning ‘cherry plum’, and translates as something like ‘plum-filled’.

The Javakheti region, where the village of Tkemlobi is located, was within the borders of historical Georgia. Indeed, the Ottomans seized this region and the village from the Georgians in 1578.

The village of Tkemlobi is recorded as "Dighemlob" (دیغملوب) in the Ottoman land-survey register (mufassal defter) of 1595. At that time, the village was part of the Meşe district (nahiye) of the Ardahan-i Büzürg province (liva) within the Vilayet of Georgia (Vilayet-i Gürcistan). Its population consisted of seven Christian households, and the heads of families liable for tax bore Georgian names such as Gogicha, Shota, Ivane, Goga, and Batata. The village practised wheat and barley farming, beekeeping, and raised sheep and pigs. The aforementioned detailed register also mentions another village named Tkemlobi (ტყემლობი) in the Ardahan-i Büzürg district. This village, which belonged to the southern subdistrict, was recorded as uninhabited.

Tkemlobi is not listed as a village in the Ottoman Çıldır Province cebe defter (1694-1732) and in the 1886 Russian census for the Çıldır district (uchastok). This may be related to the village having been abandoned earlier.
