= Nuray Hafiftaş =

Musical artist (1962–2018)

- Born: 8 August 1964; Eskibeyrehatun, Çıldır, Ardahan Province, Turkey
- Died: 14 February 2018 (aged 53) Kurtköy, Pendik, Istanbul, Turkey
- Genres: Turkish folk music, Azerbaijani folk music, Arabesque (Turkish music)
- Occupations: Singer, composer

Nuray Hafiftaş (2 November 1962 – 14 February 2018) was a Turkish folk music singer and composer. of Karapapakh ancestry and Azerbaijan Turkish origin.

== Early years ==
Soon after her birth, her family moved to Tophane, where Hafiftaş received her primary and secondary education at Tarlabaşı school. After that, she continued her higher education at the Istanbul University State Conservatory which is part of the Istanbul Technical University Turkish Music State Conservatory.

== Career ==
After graduation, Nuray Hafiftaş continued her professional life as performer at the Istanbul University State Conservatory for four years. At the same time she signed a four-year contract with TRT Istanbul Radio to perform as a singer. Up to the present date Nuray Hafiftaş has released more than 13 vocal albums of Turkish folk music. At the same time, Hafiftaş has become famous through her music and lyrical compositions in traditional style (over 100 pieces of music), in which she tries to incorporate new sounds and uses of instruments.

== Death ==
Hafiftaş had been treated for large bowel cancer at Menzil Community Naqshbandi Islamic group hospital in the Pendik district. After a long treatment, her cancer metastasized to her liver and she died at an Istanbul hospital on 14 February 2018, at the age of 55. On 15 February she was buried at Zincirlikuyu Cemetery after a funeral ceremony in Teşvikiye Mosque.

== Discography ==
Albums

1. Asker Mektubu - Ceylan Music, 1987
2. Yaradan Aşkına – Uzelli Casette, 1988
3. Dön İki Gözüm – Sinan Music, 1989
4. Dilanım – Zara Music, 1990
5. Divane Gönlüm – Sindoma Music, 1990
6. Azeri Türküler- Harika Plaque, 1991
7. Turquie Aşık – Akbaş Müzik, 1991
8. Atılmaz Sevda – Peker Music, 1991
9. Arada Bir – Ulus Music, 1992
10. Dinle – Kaya Music, 1993
11. Şimdi Oldu – Şentürk Music, 1994
12. Eline Düştüm – Soner Music, 1996
13. Eyvah Gönül – Prestij Music, 1999
14. Leyli Leyli – Prestij Music, 2002
15. Sılayı Ver – Emrah Music, 2005
16. Yıllarım – Clipper Music, 2007
17. Yazı Bir Dert Kışı Bir Dert - Star Production, 2009
18. İstanbul ve Sen – DNK & DMC, 2016
19. Düet Arabesk 2018 (With Yunus Bülbül) - Taşkın Music Production, 2017
20. Yarim - Poll Production, 2019
