= Aşıkşenlik =

- Neighbourhood
- Location within Turkey
- Coordinates: 41°09′N 43°13′E
- Country: Turkey
- Province: Ardahan
- District: Çıldır
- Municipality: Çıldır
- Elevation: 1,915 m (6,283 ft)
- Population (2021): 277
- Time zone: UTC+3 (TRT)
- Postal code: 75400
- Area code: 0478

Aşıkşenlik, formerly Yakınsu and historically Tskhvara (Georgian: ცხვარა), is a neighbourhood of the town Çıldır, Çıldır District, Ardahan Province, Turkey. Its population is 277 (2021). Before the 2013 reorganisation, it was a town (belde). It is populated by Karapapakhs.

== Etymology ==
The former name of Aşıkşenlik village is Tskhvara. Tskhvara (ცხვარა), a Georgian place name, was written as Skhvara (سخوارە) in Ottoman Turkish. This name was later pronounced as ‘Sukhara’. Tskhvara (ცხვარა) may be related to the Georgian word ‘tskhvari’ (ცხვარი), meaning sheep. This word also means ‘Fischer's cornflower’ (Centaurea fischeri).

== Geography ==
Aşıkşenlik is 7 kilometres (4.3 mi) from Çıldır, 45 kilometres (28 mi) from Ardahan and 4 kilometres (2.5 mi) from the Georgia border check point. It is situated in a high altitude wetland.

== History ==
Aşıkşenlik is an old settlement. It was captured by Seljukid sultan Alp Arslan in 1064. After Harzemshah, Kipchaks and Mongols dominations it was annexed by the Ottoman sultan Süleyman I in 1546. According to Evliya Çelebi who lived in the 17th century, Aşıkşenlik (then known as Sukara) was one of the wealthiest towns of the Ottoman Empire in the east.

The village of Tskhvara was part of Georgia before it was captured by the Ottomans in 1578. Indeed, the remains of megalithic structures in the village indicate that it was an ancient settlement. In the Ottoman census of 1595, Tskhvara consisted of 18 Christian households, most of whose heads bore Georgian names.

The village of Tskhvara was ceded to Russia by the Ottoman Empire following the Russo-Turkish War of 1877–1878. In the 1886 census of the Russian administration, Sukhara (Сухара) was one of eight villages in the Sukhara sub-district (Сухаринскій маркязъ) of the Çıldır district (uchastok) of the Ardahan Okrug. It was also the administrative center of the sub-district (маркязъ). The village had a population of 806, of whom 7 were Turks and 799 were Karapapak.

In 1877 Russians captured Aşıkşenlik during the Russo-Turkish War (1877-1878). But in 1921 it was returned to Turkey.
