= Kenarbel, Çıldır =

Kenarbel
- Village
- Location within Turkey
- Coordinates: 41°11′N 43°10′E
- Country: Turkey
- Province: Ardahan
- District: Çıldır
- Population (2021): 334
- Time zone: UTC+3 (TRT)

Kenarbel is a village in the Çıldır District, Ardahan Province, Turkey. Its population is 334 (2021). The village is populated by Karapapakhs and Turks.
