= Semihaşakir, Çıldır =

Semihaşakir
- Village
- Location within Turkey
- Coordinates: 41.135°N 43.051°E
- Country: Turkey
- Province: Ardahan
- District: Çıldır
- Population (2021): 112
- Time zone: UTC+3 (TRT)

Semihaşakir, also known as Koçgüden, is a village in the Çıldır District, Ardahan Province, Turkey. Its population is 112 (2021). The village is populated by Karapapakhs.
