= Zaki, Çıldır =

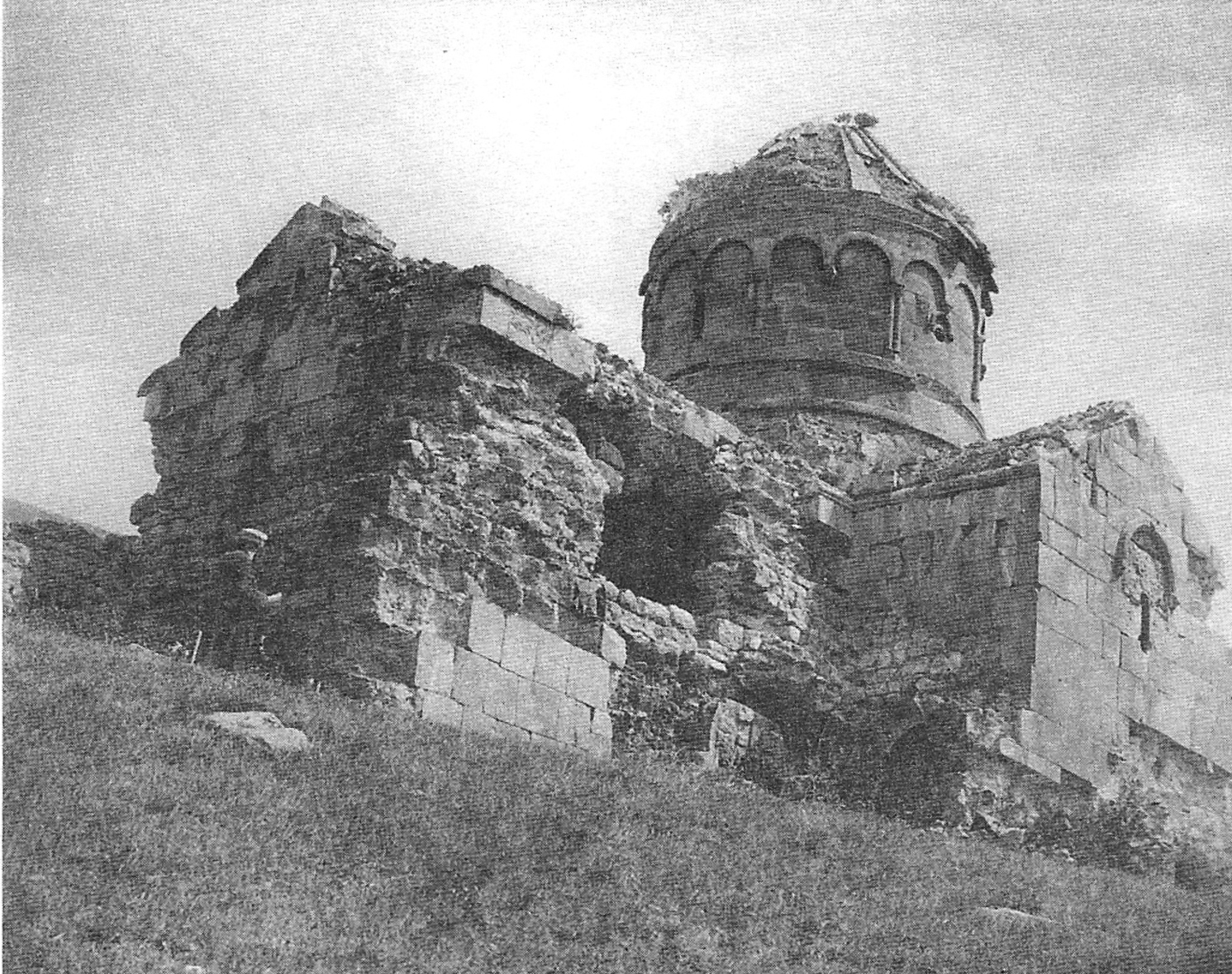
Zaki or Zegani Church in village of Zaki or Zegani, 1902, Dmitri Yermakov

Zaki (Georgian: ზაქი or ზაკი) or Zegani (Georgian: ზეგანი) is a village that has disappeared from the Turkish part of the historical Javakheti region. The settlement area is now within the boundaries of the village of Dirsekkaya (formerly Zarabuki), which is part of the Çıldır District of Ardahan Province in Turkey.

== History ==
There is no clarity regarding the meaning of the Georgian place name Zaki (ზაქი or ზაკი). This place name is written as Zak (زاك) in the Ottoman land-survey register (mufassal defter) of 1595. In 1902, Georgian historian and archaeologist Ekvtime Takaishvili wrote the name of the village church as Zaki (Заки) as well as Zegan (Зеган) in Russian language. In the Georgian language, ‘zegani’ (ზეგანი) means plateau.

The Javakheti region, where the village of Zaki is located, was one of the areas that made up historical Georgia. Indeed, the Ottomans seized this region and the village from the Georgians in 1578. The Zaki Church or Zegani Church, built no later than the 10th century, indicates that this was a very old settlement.

In the Ottoman land-survey register (mufassal defter) of 1595, the village of Zaki was listed as belonging to the Kurd Kalası district (nahiye) of the Çıldır Province (liva) within the Vilayet of Georgia (Vilayet-i Gürcistan). Its population consisted of 12 Christian households. The fact that this was a Georgian settlement is evident from the names of the heads of households. According to this register, the village engaged in the cultivation of wheat, barley, rye and flax seeds, beekeeping, and the rearing of sheep and pigs.

According to the Ottoman cebe defter covering the period 1694-1732 in the Province of Çıldır, the village of Zaki held the same administrative status in the year 1119 AH (1705/1706 AD). The village's income was granted as a timar to a man named Ali. However, the name Zaki does not appear among the villages of the Çıldır district (uchastok) in the 1886 Russian census. It is understood that the village of Zaki, located 3 kilometres southeast of the village of Dirsekkaya, had disappeared before this date. Indeed, Ekvtime Takaishvili did not mention the existence of the village when he examined the Zaki Church in 1902.
