= Akçakale, Çıldır =

Akçakale
- Village
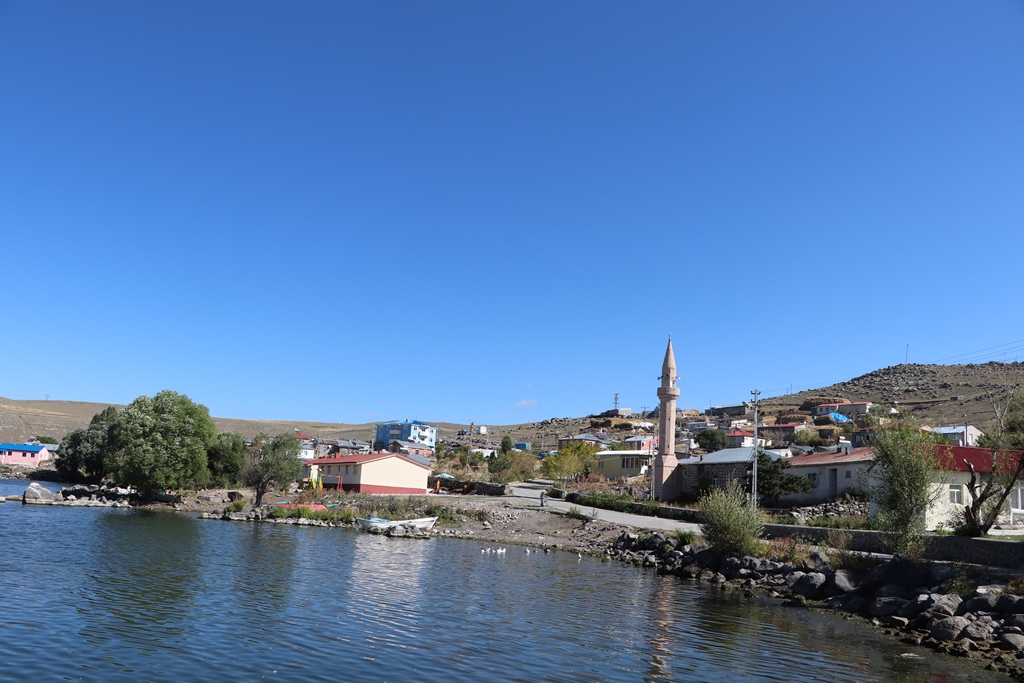

- Location within Turkey
- Coordinates: 41.0808°N 43.2972°E
- Country: Turkey
- Province: Ardahan
- District: Çıldır
- Population (2021): 205
- Time zone: UTC+3 (TRT)

Akçakale is a village in the Çıldır District, Ardahan Province, Turkey. Its population is 205 (2021), and is populated by Karapapakhs. The village is located on the north-eastern shore of Lake Çıldır.

The ancient name of the village of Akçakale is Tetrtsikhe. Tetrtsikhe (თეთრციხე), a Georgian place name, means "white castle". This place name was translated into Turkish as "Ağca Kala" (اغجە قلعە), and over time it became Akçakale.
