= Yenibeyrehatun, Çıldır =

Yenibeyrehatun
- Village
- Location within Turkey
- Coordinates: 41°08′N 42°58′E
- Country: Turkey
- Province: Ardahan
- District: Çıldır
- Population (2021): 60
- Time zone: UTC+3 (TRT)

Yenibeyrehatun is a village in the Çıldır District, Ardahan Province, Turkey. Its population is 60 (2021). The village is populated by Karapapakhs.
