= Yukarıcambaz, Çıldır =

Yukarıcambaz
- Village
- Location within Turkey
- Coordinates: 41°08′N 43°16′E
- Country: Turkey
- Province: Ardahan
- District: Çıldır
- Population (2021): 331
- Time zone: UTC+3 (TRT)

Yukarıcambaz is a village in the Çıldır District, Ardahan Province, Turkey. Its population is 331 (2021).

The village is populated by Karapapakhs.

== Population ==
Historical population
| Year | Pop. | ±% p.a. |
|---|---|---|
| 1985 | 913 | — |
| 1990 | 580 | −8.67% |
| 1997 | 333 | −7.62% |
| 2007 | 353 | +0.58% |
| 2012 | 354 | +0.06% |
| 2017 | 329 | −1.45% |
| 2021 | 331 | +0.15% |
Source: Population censuses (1985-1997) and TÜIK (2007-2021)
