= Güvenocak, Çıldır =

Güvenocak
- Village
- Location within Turkey
- Coordinates: 41°07′N 43°13′E
- Country: Turkey
- Province: Ardahan
- District: Çıldır
- Population (2021): 268
- Time zone: UTC+3 (TRT)

Güvenocak is a village in the Çıldır District, Ardahan Province, Turkey. Its population is 268 (2021). The village is populated by Karapapakhs.
