= Tskarostavi Church =

Georgian church in Ardahan Province, Turkey

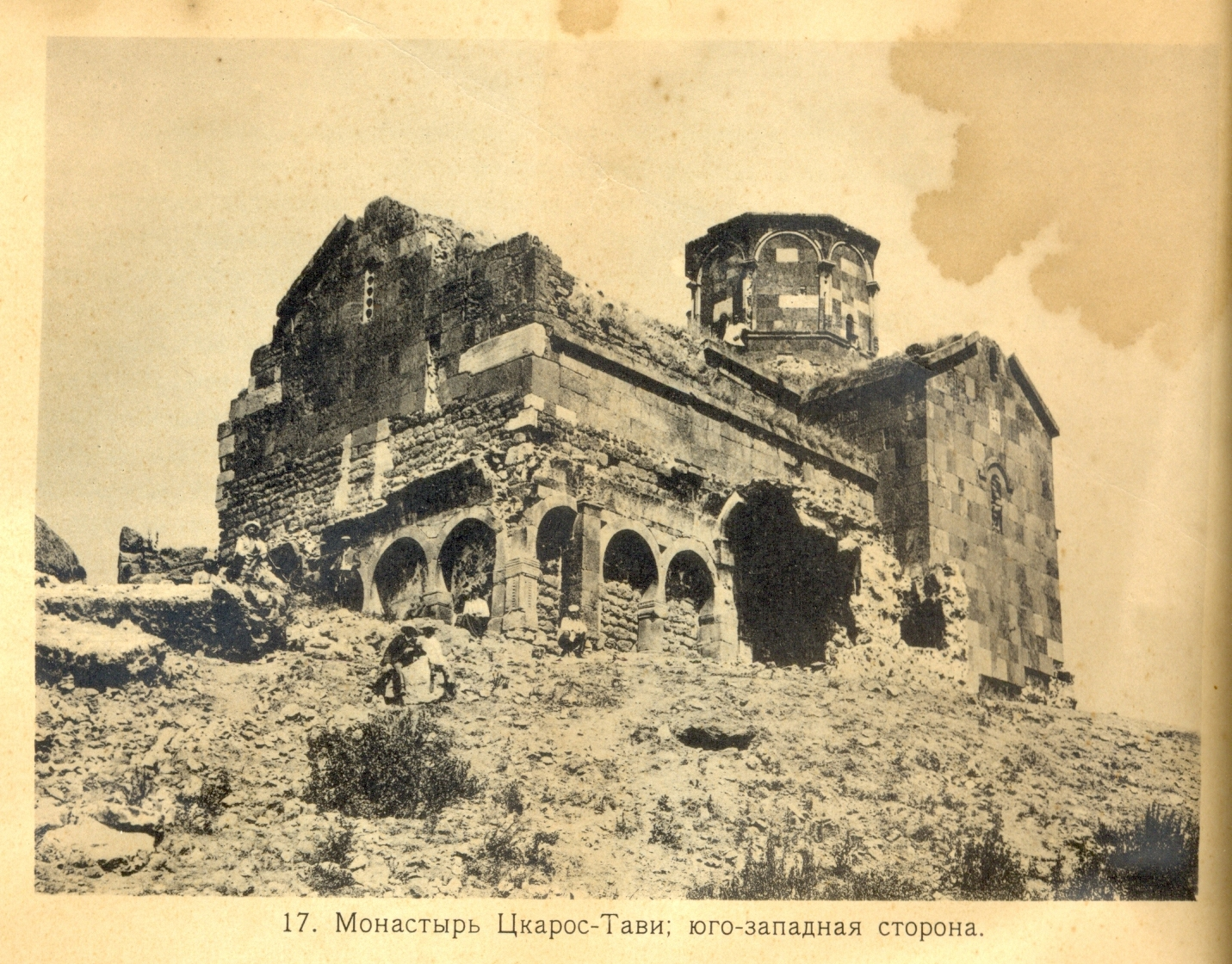
Church of Tskarostavi

Tskarostavi Church (Georgian: წყაროსთავის საეპისკოპოსო ტაძარი), was a Georgian episcopal church in the early Middle Ages in the historical region of Javakheti. It was located in the village of Öncül, formerly known as Tskarostavi, which is now part of the Çıldır District in Ardahan Province in Turkey.

The Tskarostavi Church has been completely destroyed. The stones from the church have been used in various structures in the village. The church's patterned stones can be found in one of these structures, the mosque. One of the patterned stones has also been found on the wall of a house in the village.
