= Sabaholdu, Çıldır =

Sabaholdu
- Village
- Location within Turkey
- Coordinates: 41°18′N 43°07′E
- Country: Turkey
- Province: Ardahan
- District: Çıldır
- Population (2021): 229
- Time zone: UTC+3 (TRT)

Sabaholdu, formerly Kodas, is a village in the Çıldır District, Ardahan Province, Turkey. Its population is 229 (2021). The village is populated by Karapapakhs.
