= Damlıca, Çıldır =

Damlıca
- Village
- Location within Turkey
- Coordinates: 41.143°N 43.292°E
- Country: Turkey
- Province: Ardahan
- District: Çıldır
- Population (2021): 168
- Time zone: UTC+3 (TRT)

Damlıca is a village in the Çıldır District, Ardahan Province, Turkey. Its population is 168 (2021). The village is populated by Karapapakhs.
