= Gölebakan, Çıldır =

Gölebakan
- Village
- Location within Turkey
- Coordinates: 41.0497°N 43.1345°E
- Country: Turkey
- Province: Ardahan
- District: Çıldır
- Population (2021): 423
- Time zone: UTC+3 (TRT)

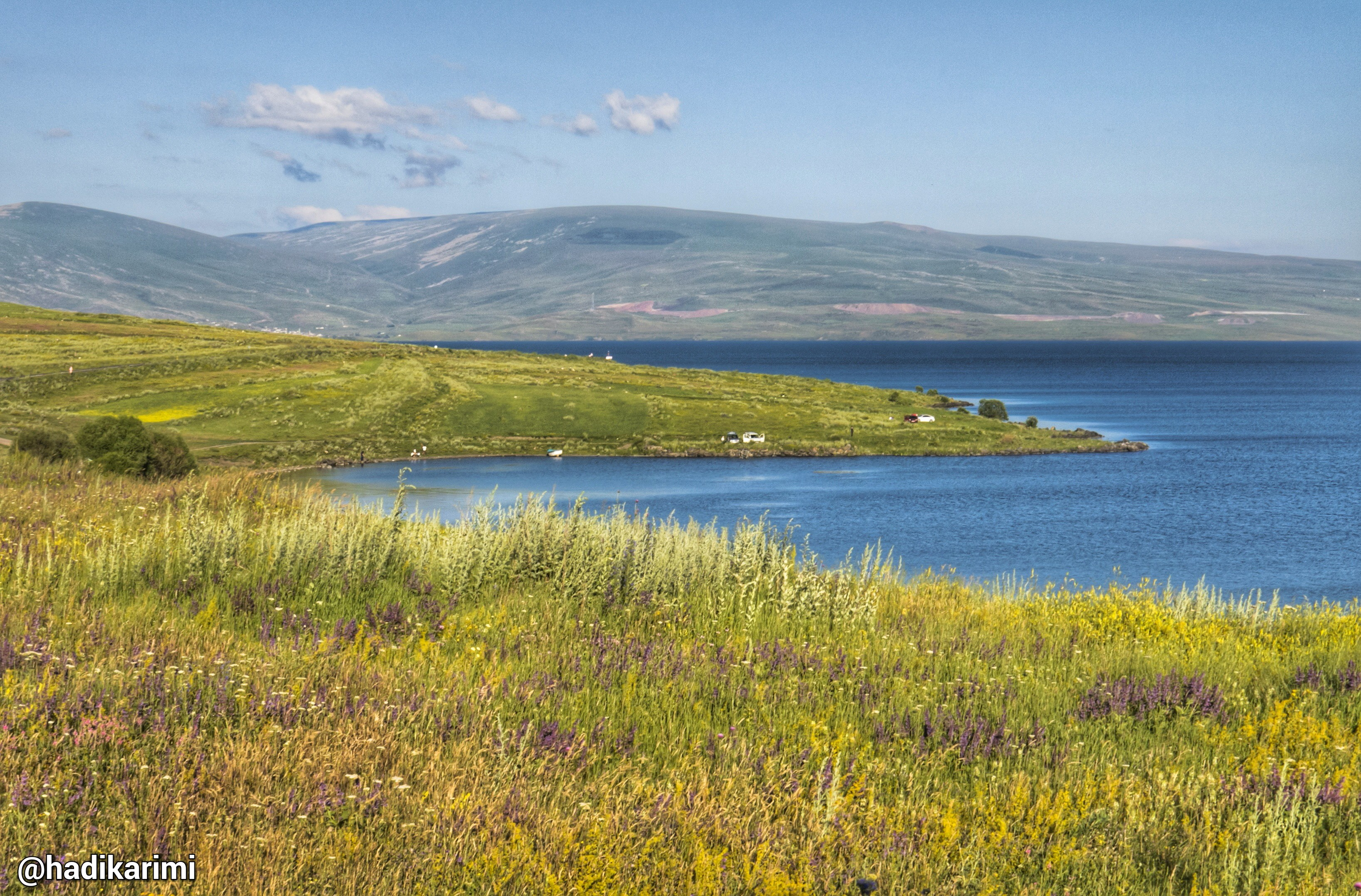
View of lake Çıldır nearby Göllebakan

Gölebakan is a village in the Çıldır District, Ardahan Province, Turkey. Its population is 423 (2021). The village is populated by Karapapakhs among other groups.
