= Karakale =

Karakale can refer to:

- Karakale, Aziziye
- Karakale, Çıldır
- Karakale, Hanak
- Karakale, İspir
- Karakale, Karayazı
- Karakale, Pasinler
