= Başköy, Çıldır =

Başköy
- Village
- Location within Turkey
- Coordinates: 41.1428°N 43.3255°E
- Country: Turkey
- Province: Ardahan
- District: Çıldır
- Population (2021): 89
- Time zone: UTC+3 (TRT)

Başköy is a village in the Çıldır District, Ardahan Province, Turkey. Its population is 89 (2021). The village is populated by Karapapakhs.
