= Gölbelen, Çıldır =

Gölbelen
- Village
- Location within Turkey
- Coordinates: 41°04′N 43°07′E
- Country: Turkey
- Province: Ardahan
- District: Çıldır
- Population (2021): 389
- Time zone: UTC+3 (TRT)

Gölbelen is a village in the Çıldır District, Ardahan Province, Turkey. Its population is 389 (2021). The village is populated by Karapapakhs.
