= Meryemköy, Çıldır =

Meryemköy
- Village
- Location in Turkey
- Coordinates: 41°08′N 43°01′E
- Country: Turkey
- Province: Ardahan
- District: Çıldır
- Population (2021): 144
- Time zone: UTC+3 (TRT)

Meryemköy is a village in the Çıldır District, Ardahan Province, Turkey. Its population is 144 (2021). The village is populated by Karapapakhs.
