= Saymalı, Çıldır =

Saymalı
- Village
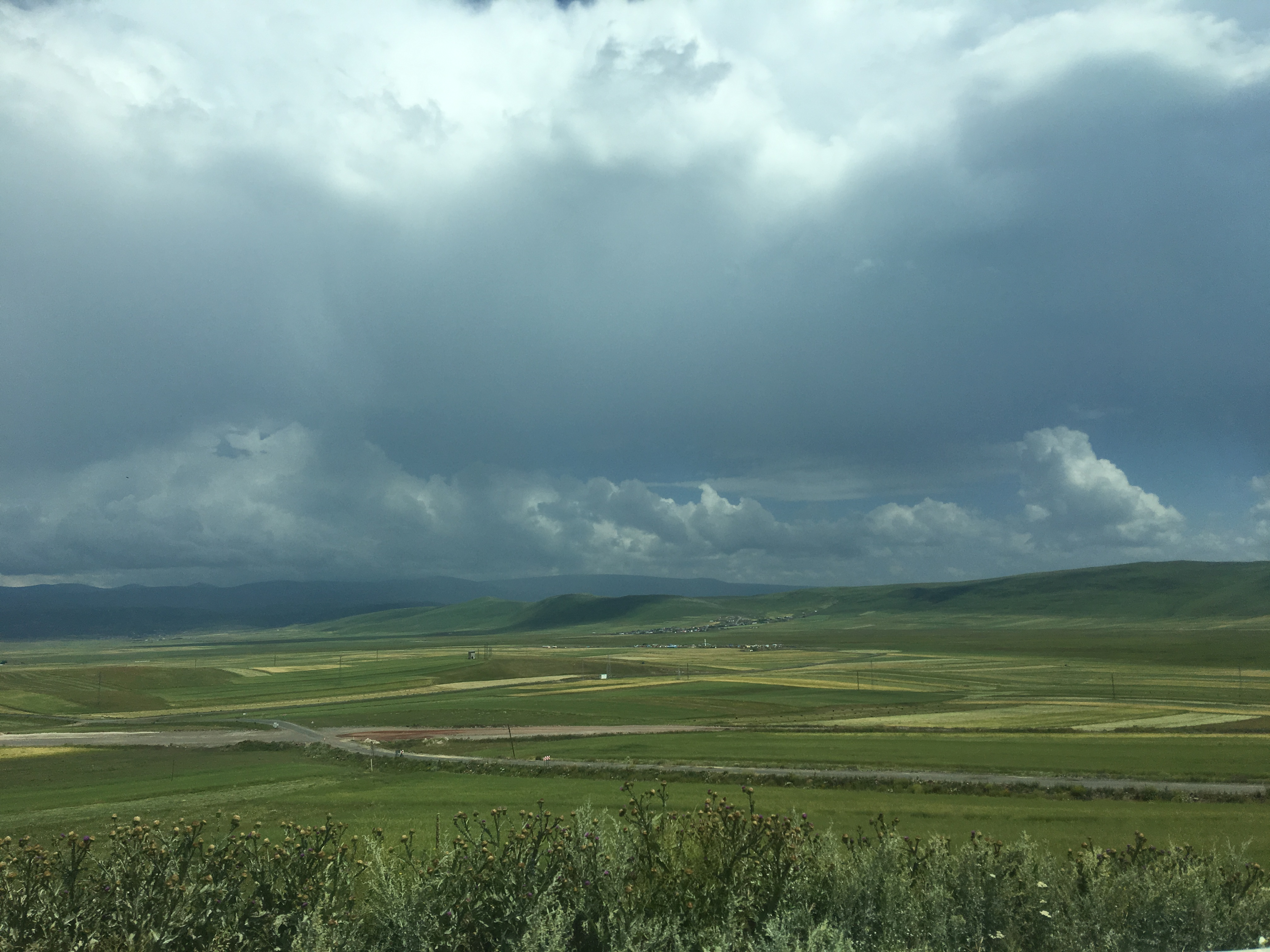

- Location within Turkey
- Coordinates: 41°07′N 43°11′E
- Country: Turkey
- Province: Ardahan
- District: Çıldır
- Population (2021): 187
- Time zone: UTC+3 (TRT)

Saymalı is a village in the Çıldır District, Ardahan Province, Turkey. Its population is 187 (2021). The village is populated by Karapapakhs.
