= Eskibeyrehatun, Çıldır =

Eskibeyrehatun
- Village
- Location within Turkey
- Coordinates: 41°07′N 42°57′E
- Country: Turkey
- Province: Ardahan
- District: Çıldır
- Population (2021): 453
- Time zone: UTC+3 (TRT)

Eskibeyrehatun is a village in the Çıldır District, Ardahan Province, Turkey. Its population is 453 (2021). The village is populated by Karapapakhs and Azerbaijanis.
