= Karakale, Çıldır =

Karakale
- Village
- Location within Turkey
- Coordinates: 41.1644°N 43.2880°E
- Country: Turkey
- Province: Ardahan
- District: Çıldır
- Population (2021): 229
- Time zone: UTC+3 (TRT)

Karakale is a village in the Çıldır District, Ardahan Province, Turkey. Its population is 229 (2021). The village is populated by Karapapakhs.
