= Kotanlı, Çıldır =

Kotanlı
- Village
- Location within Turkey
- Coordinates: 41.1599°N 43.0375°E
- Country: Turkey
- Province: Ardahan
- District: Çıldır
- Population (2021): 145
- Time zone: UTC+3 (TRT)

Kotanlı is a village in the Çıldır District, Ardahan Province, Turkey. Its population is 145 (2021). The village is populated by Turks.
