= Taşdeğirmen, Çıldır =

Taşdeğirmen
- Village
- Location within Turkey
- Coordinates: 41.1565°N 43.2634°E
- Country: Turkey
- Province: Ardahan
- District: Çıldır
- Population (2021): 299
- Time zone: UTC+3 (TRT)

Taşdeğirmen is a village in the Çıldır District, Ardahan Province, Turkey. Its population is 299 (2021). The village is populated by Karapapakhs.

The former name of Taşdeğirmen is Chamdzvrali. Chamdzvrali (Georgian: ჩამძვრალი) is a Georgian word meaning something like "sunken" or "collapsed". This place name is recorded as "Chamzvral" (چامزورال) in the Ottoman land-survey register (mufassal defter) of 1595 and in the Ottoman cebe defter register (1694-1732).
