= Kuzukaya, Çıldır =

Kuzukaya
- Village
- Location within Turkey
- Coordinates: 41°10′N 43°06′E
- Country: Turkey
- Province: Ardahan
- District: Çıldır
- Population (2021): 40
- Time zone: UTC+3 (TRT)

Kuzukaya is a village in the Çıldır District, Ardahan Province, Turkey. Its population is 40 (2021). The village is populated by Turks.
