= Kaşlıkaya, Çıldır =

Kaşlıkaya
- Village
- Location within Turkey
- Coordinates: 41°10′N 43°05′E
- Country: Turkey
- Province: Ardahan
- District: Çıldır
- Population (2021): 125
- Time zone: UTC+3 (TRT)

Kaşlıkaya is a village in the Çıldır District, Ardahan Province, Turkey. Its population is 125 (2021). The village is populated by Turks.
