= Öncül, Çıldır =

Öncül
- Village
- Location within Turkey
- Coordinates: 41.2409°N 43.1653°E
- Country: Turkey
- Province: Ardahan
- District: Çıldır
- Population (2021): 289
- Time zone: UTC+3 (TRT)

Öncül, formerly Tskarostavi (Georgian: წყაროსთავი), is a village in the Çıldır District, Ardahan Province, Turkey. Its population is 289 (2021). The village is populated by Turks.

The former name of the village of Öncül is Tskarostavi. Tskarostavi (წყაროსთავი), a Georgian place name, consists of two words (წყარო: ‘spring’) and "tavi" (თავი: ‘head’) and means ‘head of the spring’. Indeed, in 1902, the Georgian historian and archaeologist Ekvtime Takaishvili wrote that there was a gushing spring below the Tskarostavi Church, which flowed along the valley and joined the Kura River. This place name is recorded in Ottoman sources as "Zgharostav" (زغارستاو) and "Zikaristav" (زيقارستاو).
