= Şeytan Castle =

Coordinates: 41.1541°N 43.1313°E

- Çıldır, Ardahan Province
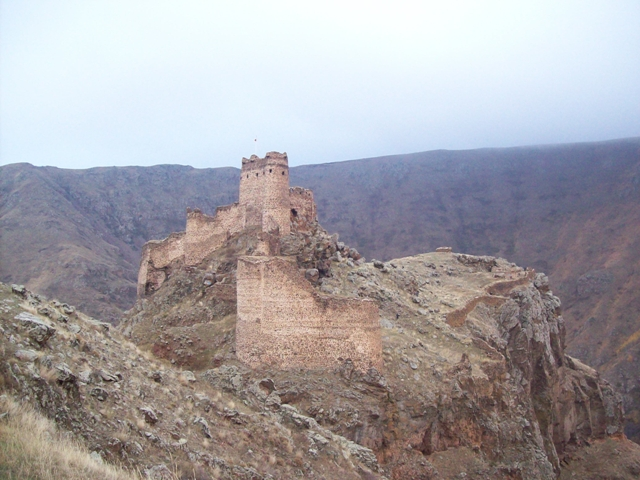

Site information
- Type: Fortress
- Open to the public: Yes

Site history
- Built: Unknown

Şeytan Castle (Turkish: Şeytan Kalesi, Georgian: ქაჯის ციხე, romanized: kajis tsikhe) is a castle in the Çıldır district of the Ardahan Province in Turkey.

The castle is located 1.5 kilometers northeast of the village of Yıldırımtepe. The cliffs surrounding the castle were as important to its protection as its walls. The castle was used continuously from the Hellenistic era to the Ottoman period, and was renovated or modified by each of its occupiers. It hosts cisterns, a staircase that descends to the water and a chapel. The name of the castle, meaning "the Devil's castle", originates from the myth that an evil spirit or a devil was sighted in the area in the past, which still survives as a superstition among the area's inhabitants.

Ekvtime Takaishvili reported the existence of a prison in the castle. It is mentioned in the chronicles of Alp Arslan in 1064.
