= Kenardere, Çıldır =

Kenardere
- Village
- Location within Turkey
- Coordinates: 41°17′N 43°10′E
- Country: Turkey
- Province: Ardahan
- District: Çıldır
- Population (2021): 87
- Time zone: UTC+3 (TRT)

Kenardere, formerly Ampuri, is a village in the Çıldır District, Ardahan Province, Turkey. Its population is 87 (2021). The village is populated by "Cavak" (Javakh) or "Yerli" (autochthon).

The historical name of Kenardere is Ampuri. The Georgian toponym Ampuri (ამფური) is derived from the Greek word "amphi" (ამფი), meaning "on both sides". This toponym was recorded as Ampur (امپور) in the Ottoman land-survey register (mufassal defter) of 1595.
