= Eşmepınar =

Eşmepınar can refer to:

- Eşmepınar, Çayırlı
- Eşmepınar, Çıldır
