= Akdarı =

Akdarı may refer to:

- Akdarı, Çıldır, village in Ardahan Province, Turkey
- Erdal Akdarı, Turkish footballer
