= Akkiraz, Çıldır =

Akkiraz
- Village
- Location within Turkey
- Coordinates: 41°15′11″N 43°06′46″E
- Country: Turkey
- Province: Ardahan
- District: Çıldır
- Population (2021): 206
- Time zone: UTC+3 (TRT)

Akkiraz (formerly Kertene in Turkish) is a village in the Çıldır District, Ardahan Province, Turkey. Its population is 206 (2021). The village is populated by Turks.

The old name of Akkiraz village is Kavtarnagebi. Kavtarnagebi (ქავთარნაგები), a Georgian place name, the Georgian proper name "Kavtara" (ქავთარა), and "nagebi" meaning "building, house" It is derived from the words (ნაგები) and means "Kavtara's houses".

Petrisi, a vanished Georgian village, was located within the present-day borders of the village of Akkiraz.
