= Eşmepınar, Çıldır =

Eşmepınar
- Village
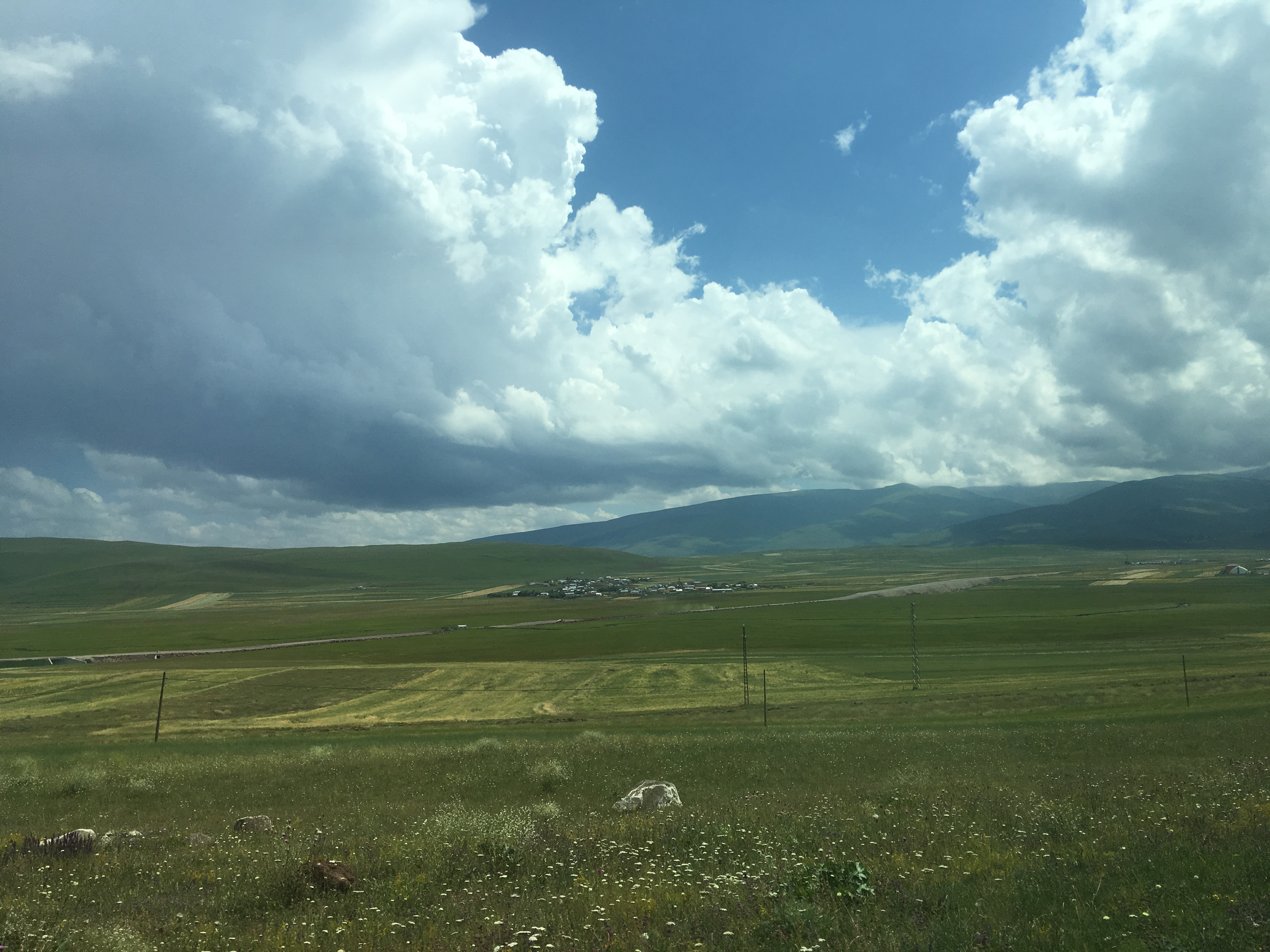

- Location within Turkey
- Coordinates: 41.1127°N 43.1523°E
- Country: Turkey
- Province: Ardahan
- District: Çıldır
- Population (2021): 305
- Time zone: UTC+3 (TRT)

Eşmepınar is a village in the Çıldır District, Ardahan Province, Turkey. Its population is 305 (2021). The village is populated by Karapapakhs.

The historical name of the village of Eşmepınar is Pruti. The Georgian word Pruti (ფრუტი) means "misty drizzling". This name appears as Purud (پورود) in the Ottoman land-survey register (mufassal defter) of 1595.
