= Taşdeğirmen =

Taşdeğirmen may refer to:

- Taşdeğirmen, Araban
- Taşdeğirmen, Çıldır
