= Petrisi =

Petrisi (Georgian: პეტრისი) is a vanished village in the Javakheti region, part of Georgia. Its settlement is now within the village of Akkiraz, Çıldır district, Ardahan Province in Turkey. The village's name is also known as Petresi (პეტრესი). What remains of this settlement is the Petresi Castle.

== History ==
The name Petrisi or Petresi likely derives from the Georgian personal name Petre (პეტრე), meaning "Petre's place." This place name appears in Turkish records as Bedris and Bedres.

The Javakheti region, where the village of Petrisi is located, is one of the areas that constituted historical Georgia. Indeed, the Ottomans captured this region and village from the Georgians in 1578. The Petrisi Church and Petrisi Castle also date from this period.

The village of Petrisi is recorded as Bedris (بدریس) in the Ottoman land-survey register (mufassal defter) of 1595. At that time, the village was part of the Kurd Kala sub-district (nahiye) of the Çıldır Liva within the "Georgian Province" (Vilayet-i Gürcistan). At that time, only three Christian households lived in the village. Petrisi, a Georgian village, cultivated wheat, barley, rye, and flaxseed, kept bees, and raised sheep and pigs.

Petrisi village held the same administrative position according to a record dated 1126 AH (1714/1715) in the Çıldır Province's (Çıldır Eyaleti) cebe defter the period 1694-1732. The village's revenue was 3,999 akçe, and the area was allocated to a person named Abdullah. This record also indicates that the village either disappeared after this period or became a neighborhood of Kavtarnagebi village. Indeed, its name is not mentioned in 19th-century records.

Petrisi village was located near Kavtarnagebi village. While Kavtarnagebi was listed as a village in the Tskarostavi (წყაროსთავი) sub-district of Çıldır district (uchastok)) of Ardahan Okrug in the 1886 Russian census, Petrisi is not mentioned. Petrisi disappeared, leaving only the castle of the same name. Indeed, Georgian historian and archaeologist Ekvtime Takaishvili wrote during his 1902 research expedition that Petrisi Castle and a small church of a typical type were discovered on the banks of the river near "Kartanakev" (Kavtarnagebi).

The settlement area of Petrisi village is located 4.2 kilometers southwest of Akkiraz (Kavtarnagebi). Petrisi Castle, which dates back to the Georgian era and includes a church, largely remains standing today. However, the church within has not survived. Petrisi village also had a village church, a place of worship for the Christian population. This church has also not survived.
