= Doğankaya =

Doğankaya (literally "hawk rock") is a Turkish place name that may refer to the following places in Turkey:

- Doğankaya, Besni, a village in the district of Besni, Adıyaman Province
- Doğankaya, Çıldır, a village in the district of Çıldır, Ardahan Province
- Doğankaya, Şereflikoçhisar, a village in the district of Şereflikoçhisar, Ankara Province
