= Doğankaya, Çıldır =

Doğankaya
- Village
- Location within Turkey
- Coordinates: 41.160°N 42.967°E
- Country: Turkey
- Province: Ardahan
- District: Çıldır
- Population (2021): 47
- Time zone: UTC+3 (TRT)

Doğankaya is a village in the Çıldır District, Ardahan Province, Turkey. Its population is 47 (2021). The village is populated by Turks.
