= Ağıllı, Çıldır =

Ağıllı
- Village
- Location within Turkey
- Coordinates: 41.267°N 43.039°E
- Country: Turkey
- Province: Ardahan
- District: Çıldır
- Population (2021): 44
- Time zone: UTC+3 (TRT)

Ağıllı, formerly Hamaş, is a village in the Çıldır District, Ardahan Province, Turkey. Its population is 44 (2021). The village is populated by Kurds and Turks.
