= Lake Çıldır =

Lake in northeastern Turkey

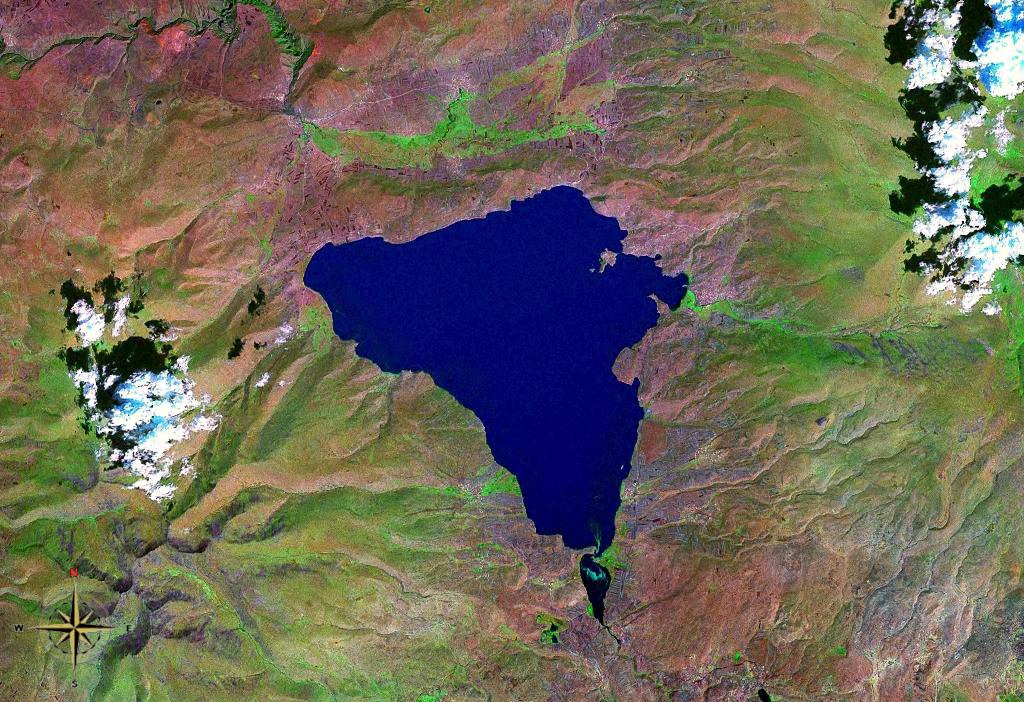
- Lake seen from space (false color)

- Location within Turkey
- Location: Çıldır, Ardahan Province
- Coordinates: 41.0425°N 43.2552778°E
- Type: Freshwater
- Basin countries: Turkey
- Surface area: 123.00 km^{2} (47.49 sq mi)
- Max. depth: 15 m (49 ft)
- Surface elevation: 1,959 m (6,427 ft)

Lake Çıldır (Turkish: Çıldır Gölü; Georgian: ჩრდილი, ჩრდილის ტბა, Črdilis tba, meaning "lake of shadows", Armenian: Ծովակ Հիւսիսոյ, Tsovak Hyusiso, meaning "small sea of the north", Armenian: Պաղկացի լիճ, Paghkatsi lich, meaning "cold lake"), is a large freshwater lake in the provinces of Ardahan and Kars in northeastern Turkey. It is located close to the borders with Georgia and Armenia. Lake Çıldır is located at an elevation of approximately 1,959 m (6,427 ft) and is surrounded by a mountainous region. It has an area of 123 km^{2} (47 sq mi) and a maximum depth of about 42 m (138 ft). Water from the lake is used for irrigation. The lake freezes over in the winter.

The area around the lake is primarily used for livestock farming, with little vegetation present and absence of agriculture due to harsh conditions.

== History ==
Its south shore may have been the location of the Etiuni, a tribal confederation frequently mentioned in the records of Urartu.

The lake has an island near the shores of the village of Akçakale, where archaeological remains are preserved.

Currently, Lake Çıldır connects to Arpaçay via an overflow channel that was opened on the basalts in the south. The Çıldır basin in the north of Lake Çıldır is connected to the Kura River by Kocaçay, one of the branches of the Kura.

== Gallery ==
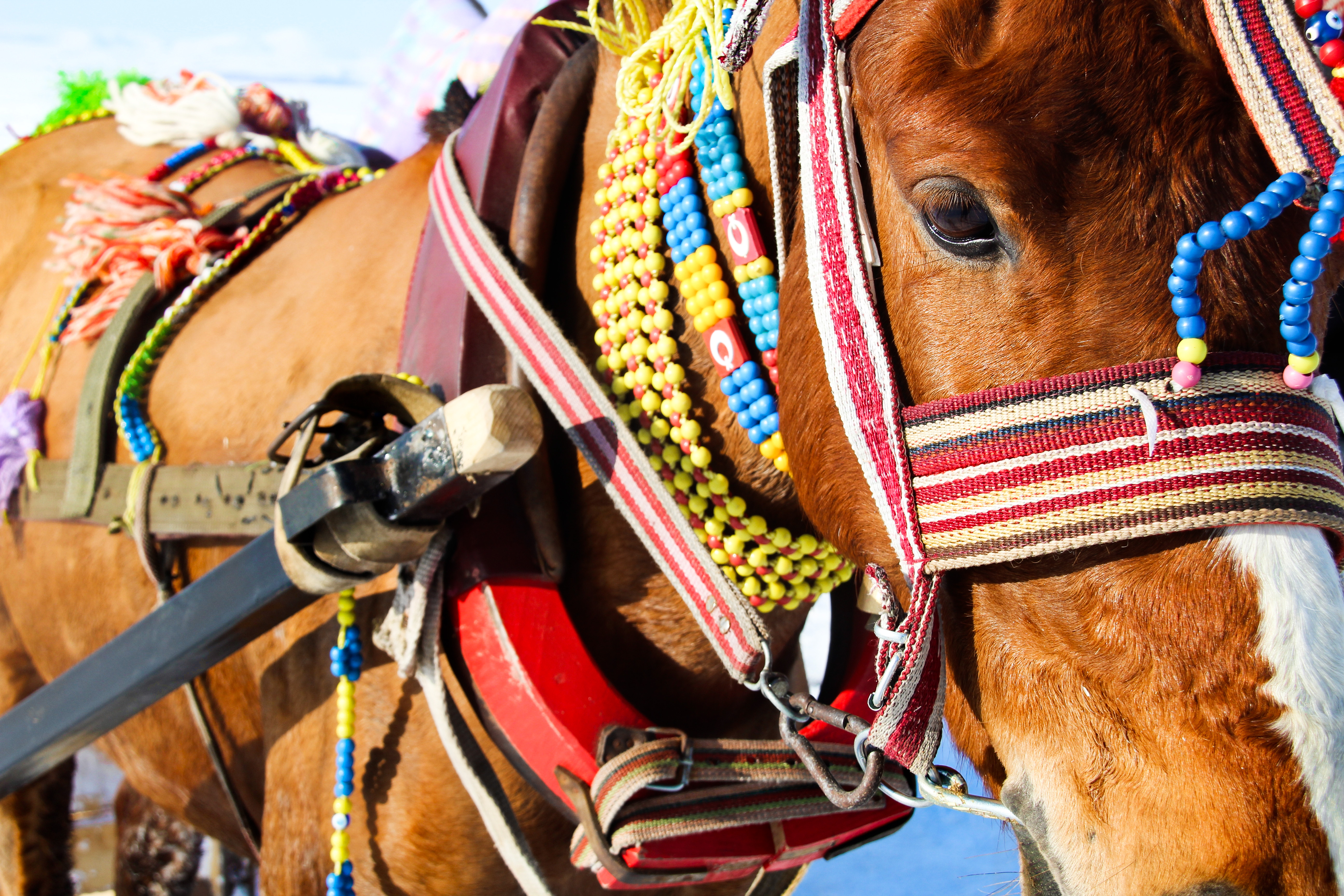
A horse at lake Çıldır

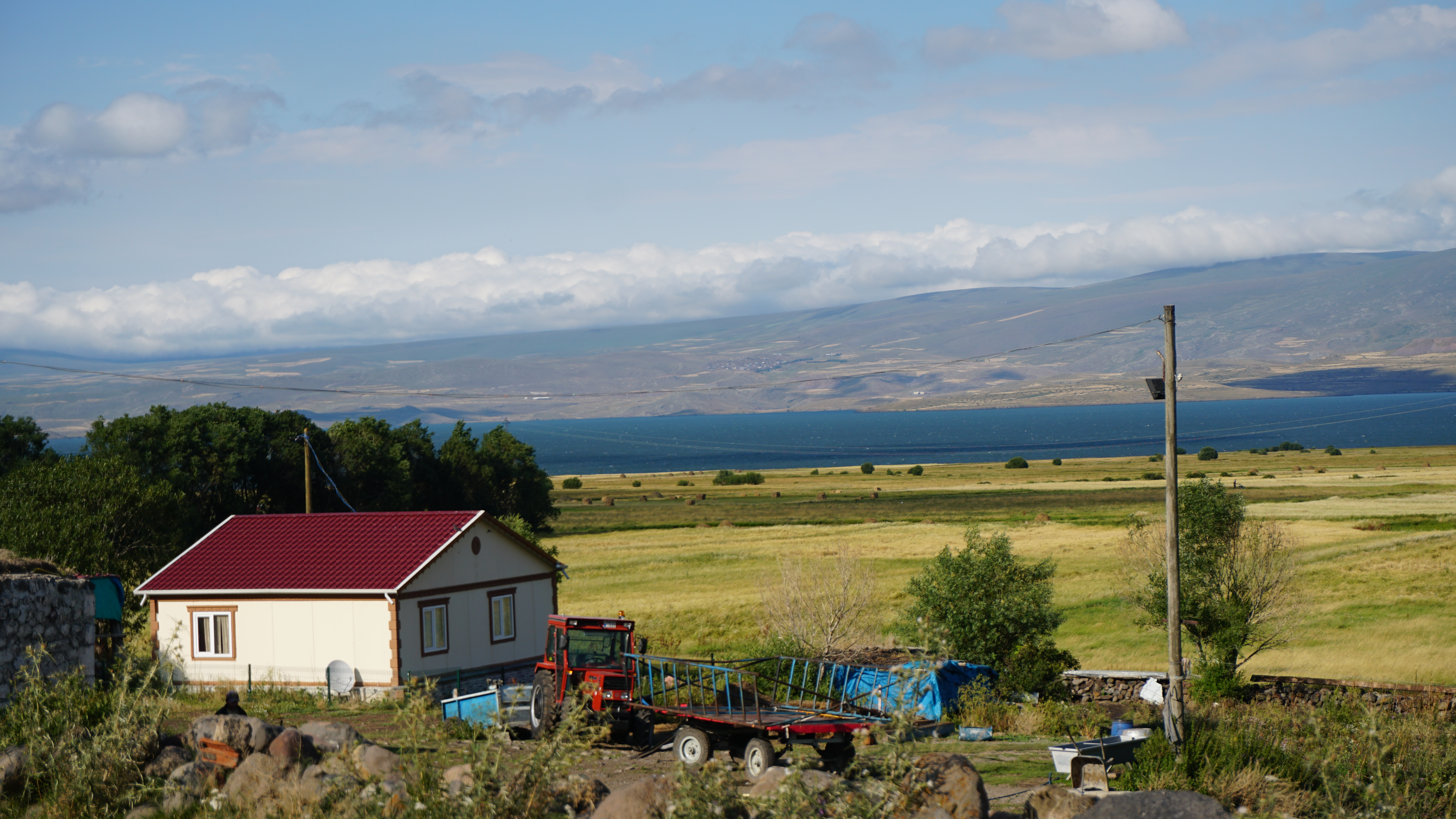
Landscape near lake Çıldır

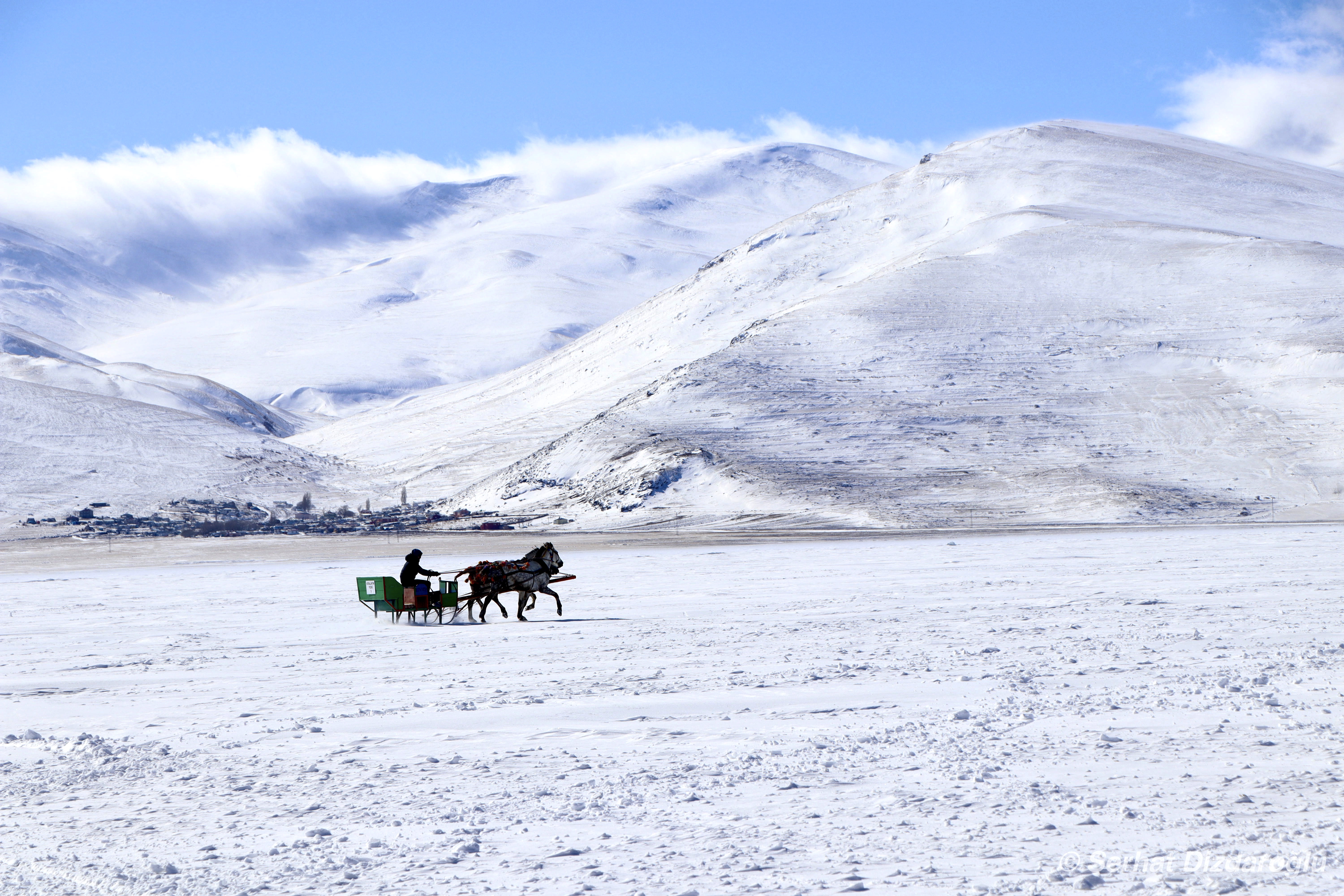
Equestrian sled in lake Çıldır

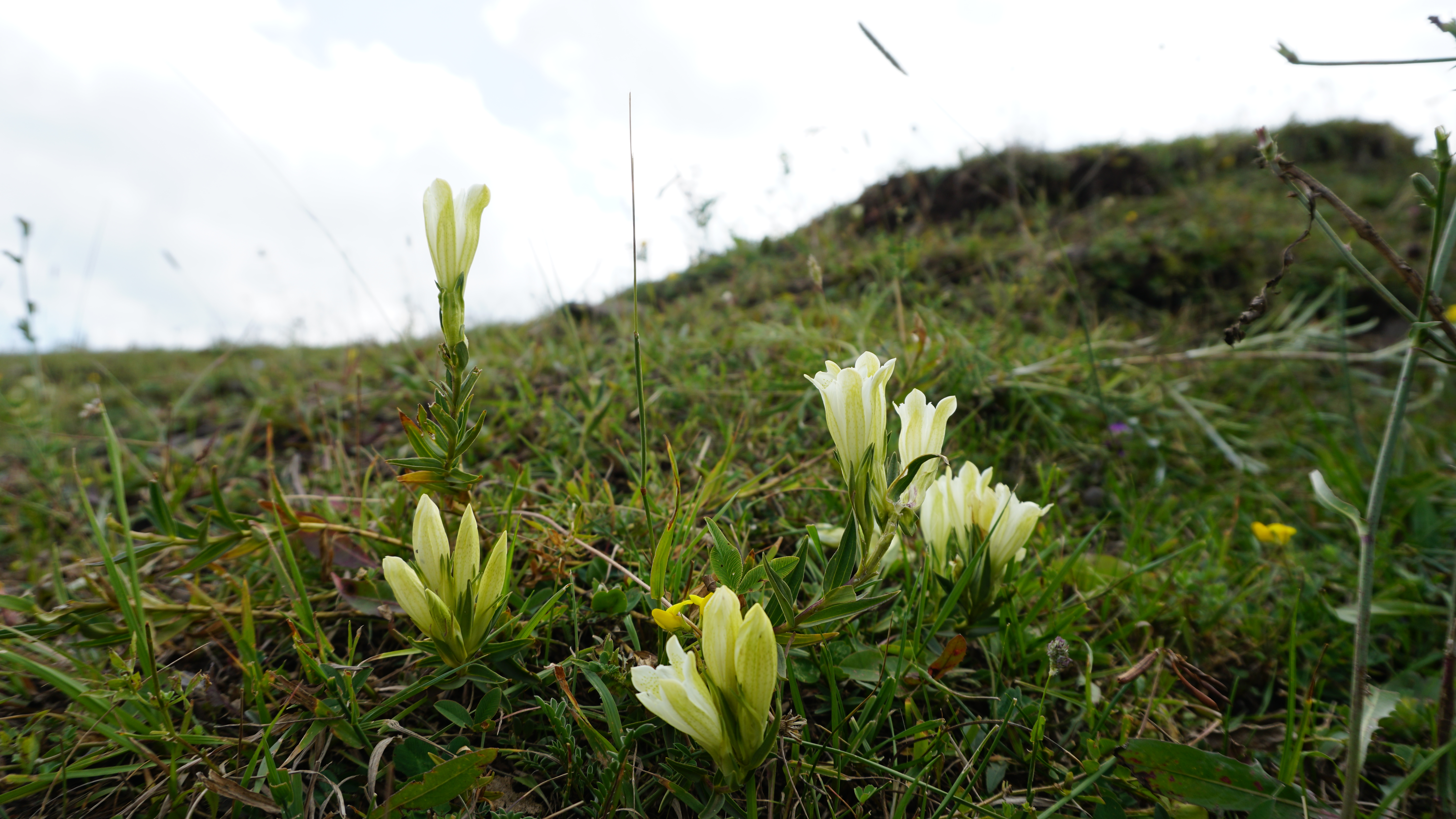
Plants near lake Çıldır
