= Baltalı, Çıldır =

Baltalı
- Village
- Location within Turkey
- Coordinates: 41.3340°N 43.1167°E
- Country: Turkey
- Province: Ardahan
- District: Çıldır
- Population (2021): 91
- Time zone: UTC+3 (TRT)

Baltalı, formerly Tataleti (Georgian: ტატალეთი), is a village in the Çıldır District, Ardahan Province, Turkey. Its population is 91 (2021). The village is populated by Turks.

The former name of Baltalı is Tataleti. Tataleti (ტატალეთი) is derived from the Megrelian word ‘tatali’ (ტატალი), meaning white chicory, and refers to a place where this plant grows abundantly. This place name is written as Tatalet (طاطالیت or تاتالیت) in Turkish sources. The name Baltalı was given to the village in 1959.

According to information provided by Georgian historian and archaeologist Ekvtime Takaishvili in 1902, the facing stones of the Tataleti Church, built of cut stone, had been removed, leaving only a large stone and the interior. The church was a small and typical structure. Tataleti Church (4.9×4.0 m) is a single-nave structure built on a rocky ridge in the centre of the village.
