= List of ambassadors of Turkey to Georgia =

The ambassador of Turkey to Georgia is the official representative of the president and the government of the Republic of Turkey to the president and government of the neighbouring country Georgia.

== List of ambassadors ==
Ambassador	Term start	Term end	Ref.
Timoçin Arbak	13 July 1992	23 November 1992	
Ahmet Rıza Demirer	1 September 1993	1 April 1994	
Ufuk Tevfik Okyayuz	1 April 1994	27 March 1998	
Burak Gürsel	30 March 1998	14 June 2002	
Dicle Kopuz	15 June 2002	18 November 2004	
Ertan Tezgör	29 November 2004	16 October 2009	
Levent Murat Burhan	30 September 2009	17 November 2013	
Zeki Levent Gümrükçü	30 January 2014	30 November 2017	
Fatma Ceren Yazgan	16 April 2018	1 July 2022	
Ali Kaan Orbay	1 July 2022	Present	

== See also ==
- Georgia–Turkey relations
