= Georgia–Turkey relations =

- Georgia: Turkey

Diplomatic mission
- Embassy of Georgia, Ankara: Embassy of Turkey, Tbilisi

Georgia–Turkey relations are foreign relations between Georgia and Turkey. Georgia has an embassy in Ankara, and two consulates–general in Istanbul and Trabzon. Turkey has an embassy in Tbilisi, and a consulate–general in Batumi. Both countries are full members of the Council of Europe, the Organization for Security and Co-operation in Europe, the BLACKSEAFOR (Black Sea Naval Co-operation Task Group), the Organization of the Black Sea Economic Cooperation and the World Trade Organization. Turkey is already a member of NATO, while Georgia is a candidate. Both Georgia and Turkey are also candidates to join the European Union. Turkey supports Georgia's territorial integrity and independence, and does not recognize the independence of Abkhazia and South Ossetia.

There are several thousand ethnic Georgians in Turkey and a smaller number of Turks (Meskhetian Turks) resident in Georgia. Due to centuries-old historical and cultural connections between the two countries, relations are generally cordial although disputes occasionally arise.

== History ==
In 1545, western Georgia was forced for the first time to accept the suzerainty of the Ottoman Empire; this suzerainty lasted until the 19th century. Despite this, the Georgian kingdoms and principalities, much like Wallachia, enjoyed significant political autonomy, and some Georgian monarchs were only nominally subject to Ottoman authority.

Many notable figures in Ottoman and Turkish history were of Georgian or Circassian descent, including Murad Bey (governor of Ottoman Egypt), Ismail Bey (regent of Ottoman Egypt), Hurshid Pasha (Grand Vizier and governor of Ottoman Egypt), Damat Gürcü Halil Rifat Pasha (Ottoman Grand Admiral), and Çürüksulu Mahmud Pasha (Minister of the Ottoman Navy). Many Ottoman Sultans intermarried with Georgian princesses and noblewomen. Imperial consorts of Georgian descent include Bidar Kadın, Bezmiâlem Sultan (mother of Abdülmecit I), Saliha Naciye Kadın, Nakşidil Sultan (mother of Mahmut II), Nükhetsezâ Hanım, and Halime Sultan (mother of Mustafa I).

After the dissolution of the Soviet Union, Turkey recognized the independence of Georgia on 16 December 1991. The formal Protocol on the Establishment of Diplomatic Relations between the two countries was signed on 21 May 1992.

The agreement on military cooperation between Turkey and Georgia was signed in 1997. Between 1998 and 2004 the Turkish side has donated USD 37.4 million to the Georgian Armed Forces whilst donating vehicles.

In 2013, a Turkish nationalist map published had included the territory of Adjara into Turkish territory, which has caused friction and hostility between Georgia and Turkey. The issue has been largely downplayed, however in 2017, Turkish President Recep Tayyip Erdoğan made a speech mentioning Georgian city Batumi, causing friction to return.

In 2025, Georgia, Turkey, and Azerbaijan reached a consensus for greater inter-parliamentary cooperation between their nations. An agreement was also signed between the governments of Turkey, Georgia, Bulgaria, and Azerbaijan for the trade of electricity produced from renewables.

== Resident diplomatic missions ==
of Georgia

- Ankara (Embassy)
- Istanbul (Consulate-General)
- Trabzon (Consulate-General)

of Turkey

- Tbilisi (Embassy)
- Batumi (Consulate-General)

== See also ==
- List of ambassadors of Turkey to Georgia
- Foreign relations of Georgia (country)
- Foreign relations of Turkey
- Georgia–Turkey border
- Georgians in Turkey
- Turks in Georgia
