= Akçıl, Çıldır =

Akçıl
- Village
- Location within Turkey
- Coordinates: 41°18′N 43°10′E
- Country: Turkey
- Province: Ardahan
- District: Çıldır
- Population (2021): 66
- Time zone: UTC+3 (TRT)

Akçıl is a village located in the Çıldır District of Ardahan Province, Turkey. As of 2021, the village has a population of 66 residents. The population of the village consists of Turks.

The former name of Akçıl is Choleti. Choleti (ჭოლეთი) is derived from the Megrelian word ‘choli’ (ჭოლი) and meaning ‘reed bed’. The village's name entered Turkish as "Çolet" (چولیت) and "Colet" (جولیت).
