= Dirsekkaya, Çıldır =

Dirsekkaya
- Village
- Location within Turkey
- Coordinates: 41°16′N 43°02′E
- Country: Turkey
- Province: Ardahan
- District: Çıldır
- Population (2021): 94
- Time zone: UTC+3 (TRT)

Dirsekkaya is a village in the Çıldır District, Ardahan Province, Turkey. Its population is 94 (2021). The village is populated by Turks.

Zaki, a vanished Georgian village, was located within the present-day borders of Dirsekkaya.
