= Akdarı, Çıldır =

Akdarı
- Village
- Location within Turkey
- Coordinates: 41.2855°N 43.1479°E
- Country: Turkey
- Province: Ardahan
- District: Çıldır
- Population (2021): 69
- Time zone: UTC+3 (TRT)

Akdarı, formerly Çamurda, is a village in the Çıldır District, Ardahan Province, Turkey. Its population is 69 (2021). The village is populated by Turks.
