= Övündü, Çıldır =

Övündü
- Village
- Location within Turkey
- Coordinates: 41.2776°N 43.1514°E
- Country: Turkey
- Province: Ardahan
- District: Çıldır
- Population (2021): 86
- Time zone: UTC+3 (TRT)

Övündü, formerly Vaşlop, is a village in the Çıldır District, Ardahan Province, Turkey. Its population is 86 (2021). The village is populated by Turks.
