= Kurtkale, Çıldır =

Kurtkale
- Village
- Location within Turkey
- Coordinates: 41°16′N 43°08′E
- Country: Turkey
- Province: Ardahan
- District: Çıldır
- Population (2021): 213
- Time zone: UTC+3 (TRT)

Kurtkale is a village in the Çıldır District, Ardahan Province, Turkey. Its population is 213 (2021). The village is populated by Turks.

Near the village is the medieval castle of Mgeltsikhe meaning "Wolf's fortress" in Georgian. Kurtkale has the same meaning in Turkish.
