= Karakale, Hanak =

Karakale
- Village
- Location within Turkey
- Coordinates: 41.3333°N 42.7152°E
- Country: Turkey
- Province: Ardahan
- District: Hanak
- Population (2021): 62
- Time zone: UTC+3 (TRT)

Karakale is a village in the Hanak District, Ardahan Province, Turkey. Its population is 62 (2021). The village is populated by Turkmens.
