= Çıldır =

- Municipality
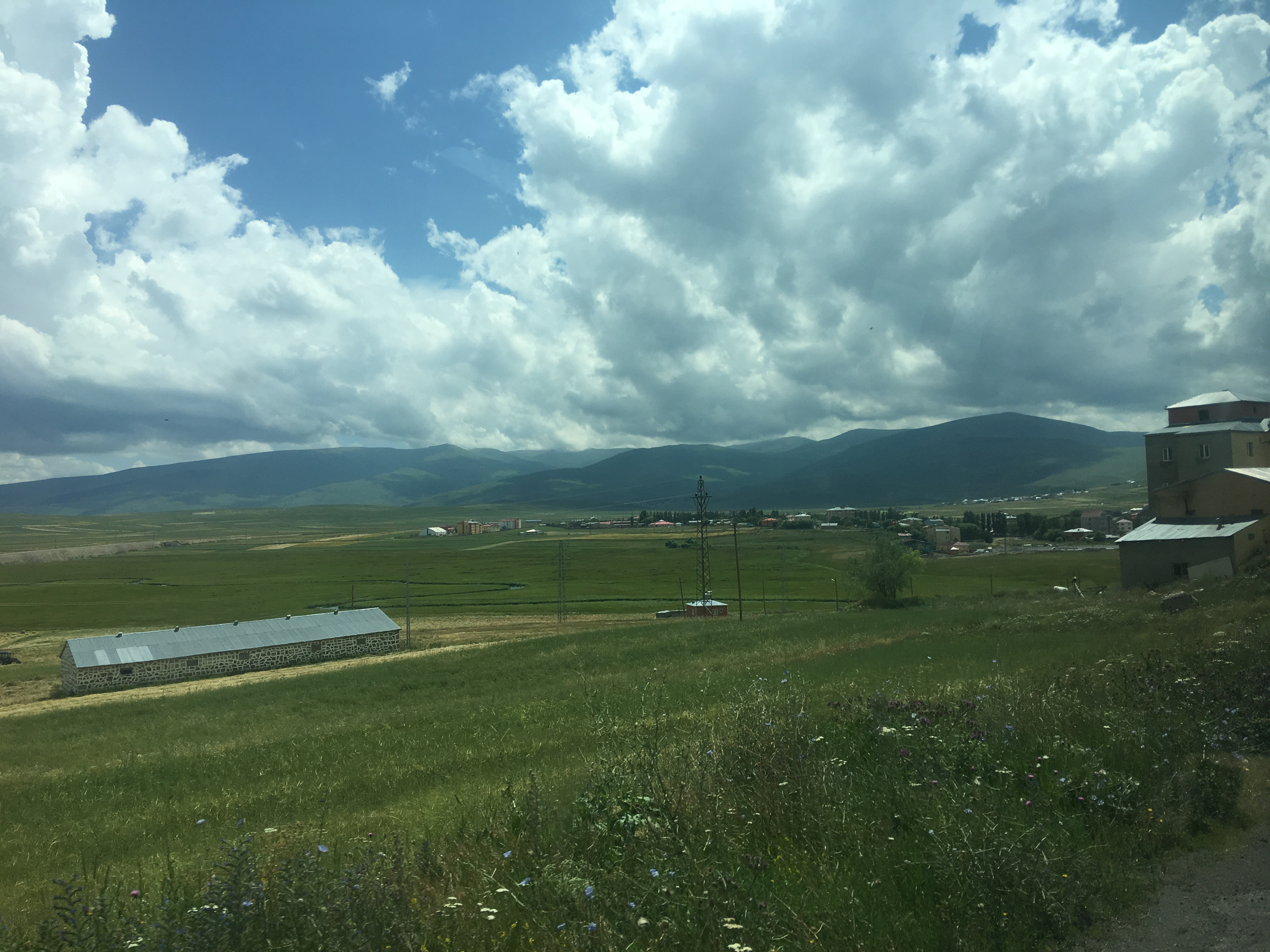

- Location within Turkey
- Coordinates: 41°07′44″N 43°07′58″E
- Country: Turkey
- Province: Ardahan
- District: Çıldır

Government
  - Mayor: Kemal Yakup Azizoğlu (AKP)
- Population (2021): 2,552
- Time zone: UTC+3 (TRT)
- Postal code: 75400
- Website: www.cildir.bel.tr

Çıldır (Armenian: Հիւսիսեան, Husenian; meaning "North"; Georgian: ჩრდილი, Chrdili; meaning "Shadow") is a town in Ardahan Province of Turkey. It is the seat of Çıldır District. Its population is 2,552 (2021). The town is populated by Turks.

The town consists of 9 quarters, including Aşıkşenlik and Yıldırımtepe.
