= Çıldır District =

District of Ardahan Province, Turkey

- District
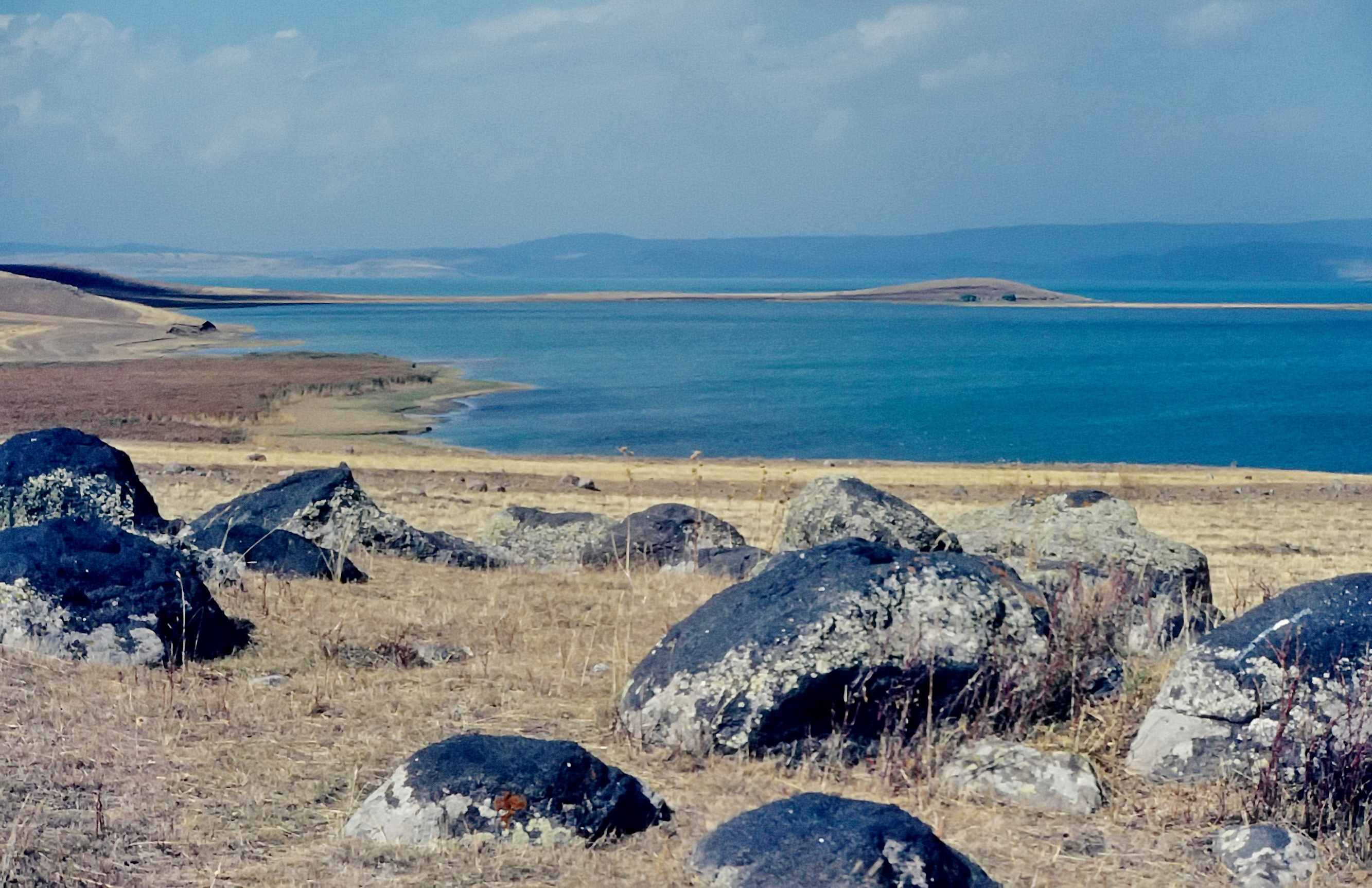
- Çıldır Lake and Ardahan Yayla

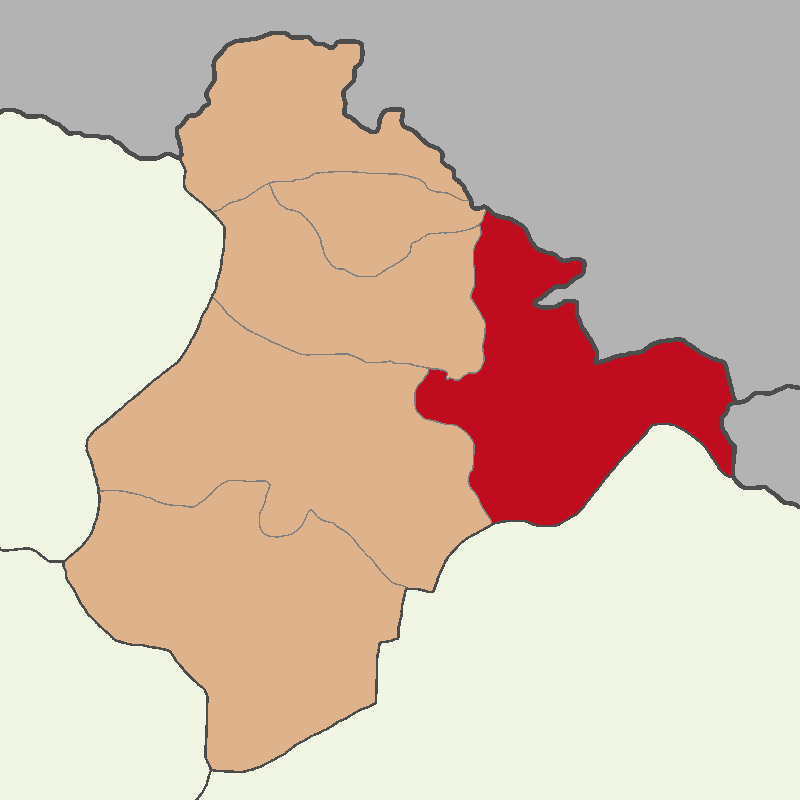
- Map showing Çıldır District in Ardahan Province

- Location within Turkey
- Coordinates: 41°08′N 43°08′E
- Country: Turkey
- Province: Ardahan
- Seat: Çıldır

Government
  - Kaymakam: Muhammed Enes İpek
- Area: 988 km^{2} (381 sq mi)
- Population (2021): 8,983
  - Density: 9.09/km^{2} (23.5/sq mi)
- Time zone: UTC+3 (TRT)
- Website: www.cildir.gov.tr

Çıldır District is a district of Ardahan Province of Turkey. Its seat is the town Çıldır. Its area is 988 km^{2}, and its population is 8,983 (2021).

Most of the rural population of the district is populated by the Karapapakh. The district is also populated by Turks.

== Composition ==
There is one municipality in Çıldır District:

- Çıldır

There are 34 villages in Çıldır District:

- Ağıllı
- Akçakale
- Akçıl
- Akdarı
- Akkiraz
- Aşağıcambaz
- Baltalı
- Başköy
- Damlıca
- Dirsekkaya
- Doğankaya
- Eskibeyrehatun
- Eşmepınar
- Gölbelen
- Gölebakan
- Güvenocak
- Karakale
- Kaşlıkaya
- Kayabeyi
- Kenarbel
- Kenardere
- Kotanlı
- Kurtkale
- Kuzukaya
- Meryemköy
- Öncül
- Övündü
- Sabaholdu
- Saymalı
- Sazlısu
- Semihaşakir
- Taşdeğirmen
- Yenibeyrehatun
- Yukarıcambaz

== See also ==
- Lake Çıldır
