= Karapapakhs =

Turkic tribe and people

Qarapapaqlar, Karapapaklar
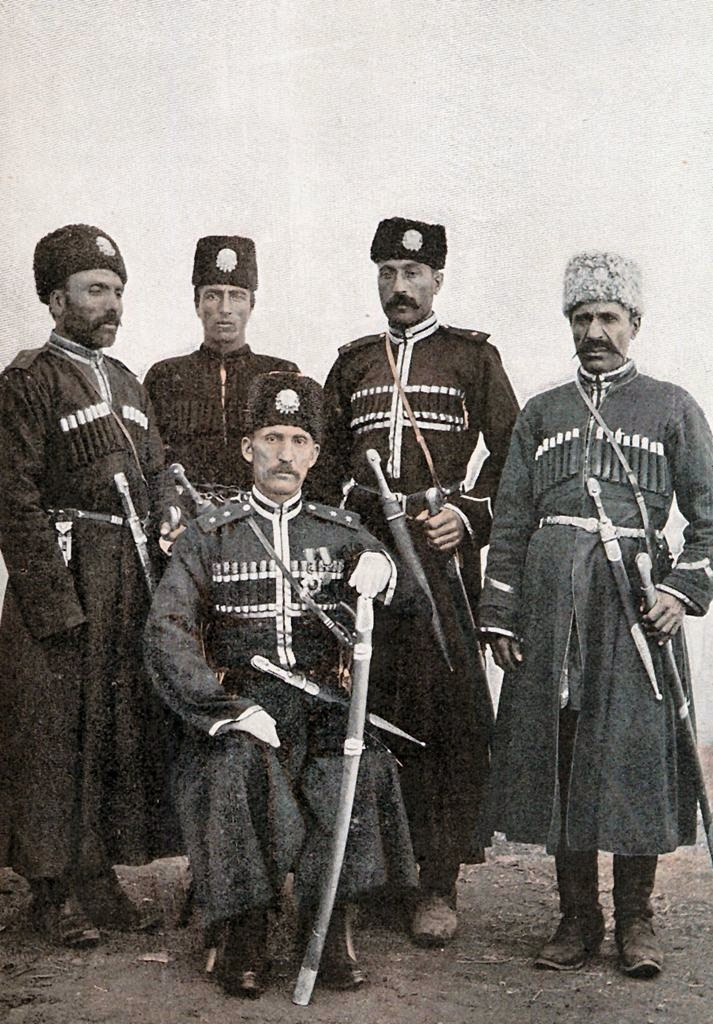
- Group of Karapapakh Hamidiyeh Cavalry, Ottoman Empire, 1901

Regions with significant populations
- Turkey (Kars, Ardahan); Iran (Naqadeh (Note: Formerly known as Sulduz.)); Georgia (Kvemo Kartli); Russia; Kazakhstan; Azerbaijan (Qazakh, Aghstafa, Tovuz and big cities such as Baku, Sumgait, Lankaran, Shirvan)

Languages
- Originally Karapapakh, nowadays mostly Azerbaijani, Turkish, Persian, Russian, and Sorani Kurdish (Note: In West Azerbaijan province.)

Religion
- Sunni Islam (Hanafi), Shia Islam (Ja'fari), Alevism and Ali-Illahism

The Karapapakhs (Azerbaijani: Qarapapaqlar; Turkish: Karapapaklar), or Terekeme (Azerbaijani: Tərəkəmələr; Turkish: Terekemeler), are a Turkic people, who originally spoke the Karapapakh language, a western Oghuz language closely related to Azerbaijani and Turkish. Nowadays, the Karapapakh language has been largely supplanted by Azerbaijani and Turkish.

After moving into Western Asia in the Middle Ages together with other Turkic speakers and Mongol nomads, the Karapapakhs settled along the Debed river in eastern Georgia (along the present-day Georgian-Armenian border). They moved to Qajar Iran, and the Ottoman Empire after the Treaty of Turkmenchay was concluded between Iran and Russia in 1828. The Karapapakhs who remained within the Russian Empire were counted as a separate group in Tsarist population figures. During the Soviet Union's existence, the Karapapakhs were culturally and linguistically assimilated by the Azerbaijanis, and they were counted as "Azerbaijanis" in the 1959 and 1970 Soviet censuses. In 1944, the Karapapakh in the Soviet Union were deported en masse to Soviet Central Asia.

The Karapapakhs have traditionally been Sunnis, Shias, and adherents of Ali-Illahism. According to the latest western ethnographic works that primarily dealt with the ethnography of the Soviet Union, most Karapapakhs in the 1980s lived in Turkey, Iran, Soviet Central Asia (primarily the Uzbek SSR) and the Soviet republics of the Caucasus (primarily the Georgian SSR and the Armenian SSR).

== Name ==
Karapapakh translates as "black hat" in Oghuz Turkic. The Karapapakhs are sometimes referred to as Terekeme or Tarakama (from Arabic: تراكمة, romanized: Tarākameh, the broken plural for Turkmen—a term traditionally used for any Turkic nomadic people).

== History ==
The Karapapakhs were originally a Turkoman group. George Bournoutian referred to them as "Turkicized Kazakhs (Qazzaqs)." They had moved into Western Asia in the Middle Ages together with other Turkic-speaking and Mongol nomads, where some had become peasants.

The Karapapakh fought on the Iranian side against the Russians in the Russo-Persian War of 1804–1813. Following the Russian victory in the Russo-Persian War of 1826–1828 and the resulting Treaty of Turkmenchay, the Karapapakhs migrated from the area along the Debed (Note: Also known as Debeda or Borchala river.) river in eastern Georgia (along the present-day Georgian-Armenian border), to the Ottoman Empire and Qajar Iran. They partly settled in the Ottoman region of Kars, where they formed 15% of the population, and partly in the Iranian region of Solduz (present-day Naqadeh), south of Lake Urmia. Iranian crown prince Abbas Mirza handed over the Solduz (present-day Naqadeh) district as a fief to 800 Karapapakh families and these new settlers, in return, had to have 400 horsemen ready for disposal for the government. Just prior to their arrival, there were 4–5,000 families in Solduz district consisting of Kurds and Turkics from the Muqaddam tribe. Gradually however, the land passed into the hands of the Karapapakh newcomers. In 19th-century Iran, as part of the Iranian irregular army, the Karapapakh tribe was one of the twenty-two units (dastehs) of provincial militia from the province of Azerbaijan.

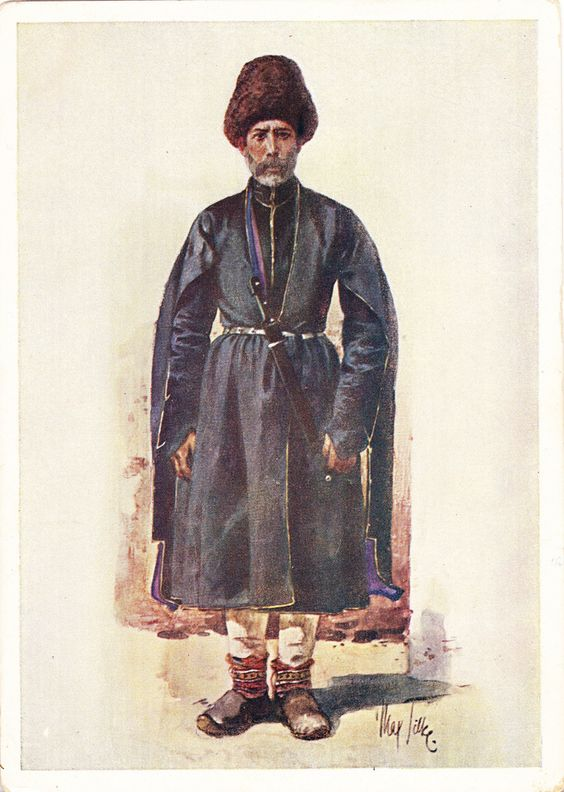
Karapapakh man

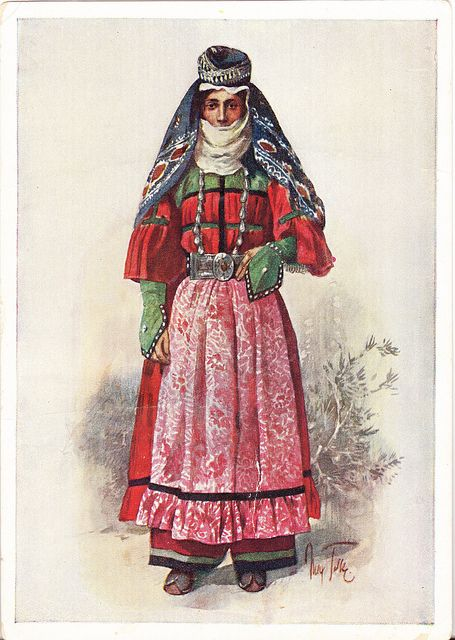
Karapapakh woman from near Kars as depicted by Max Karl Tilke (1915)

Several years after the Russian conquest of Kars, the Tsarist government conducted a population counting of the newly acquired province. In this 1883 population counting of the Kars Oblast, the Karapapakhs (in Russian, Карапапахи) numbered 21,652, of whom 11,721 were Sunnis and 9,931 were Shias. The Tsarist authorities also regarded the Terekeme tribe of the Dagestan Oblast as part of the Karapapakh tribe. The 1886–1892 Tsarist population figures counted 8,893 Terekeme in the Dagestan Oblast and counted them as part of the total Karapapakh population within the empire. According to the Russian Empire Census of 1897, there were 29,879 Karapapakhs in the entire Russian Empire. According to the 1910 publication of the Caucasian Calendar, Karapapakhs reportedly numbered some 39,000 and were distributed in 99 villages in Kars Oblast. 63 of these villages were located in the Kars district, 29 in Ardahan, and 7 in Kağızman.

During the Ottoman occupation of Iran's Naqadeh from 1908 to 1912, the Karapapakh population suffered considerably as they were seen as Iranian agents by the Ottomans. In the early 20th century, the Karapapakh in Naqadeh district shared eleven villages with Sunni Kurds.

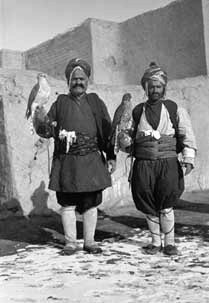
Karapapakh falconers in Naqadeh, Iran (1913)

According to the 1926 Soviet census, the number of Karapapakhs had drastically declined to only 6,315, which reflected the loss of Kars Oblast to the newly established Republic of Turkey following World War I. Mid-1920 figures showed that 70% of all Karapapakhs lived in Iran and 30% in the Soviet Union; the Karapapakhs in Turkey were most likely considered simply as Turks by that time, and thus no figures for Turkey were reported. According to Shirin Akiner's Islamic Peoples of the Soviet Union, first published in 1983 and dealing with the situation in and around the 1926 Soviet census, the great majority of the Karapapakh lived outside of the Soviet Union at the time. Those within the Soviet Union, mainly lived in the southern part of the Azerbaijan SSR along the Aras River. Akiner added that even in 1926, barely any Karapapakh could converse in the original Karapapakh language. Most of the Soviet Karapapakhs at the time were Sunnis, with a minority being Shia. The Karapapakhs were listed as a separate group in the 1926 Soviet census. During the Soviet Union's existence however the Karapapakhs were culturally and linguistically assimilated by the Azerbaijanis. They were counted as "Azerbaijanis" in the 1959 and 1970 Soviet censuses.

In 1944, the Karapapakhs in the Soviet Union were deported en masse to Soviet Central Asia, along with Meskhetian Turks, Kurds and others of the Georgian SSR.

According to Olson et al., which was published in 1994 and specifically deals with the ethnography of the Russian Empire and the Soviet Union, the Karapapakhs are described as a small ethnic group and a Turkmen tribe, who primarily live in and around Tashkent, the capital of the Uzbek SSR at the time of the book's publication. They add that the Karapapakhs are primarily adherents of the Ali-Illahism syncretic religion. They also explain that due to the religious practices of the Karapapakh, "there has traditionally been an element of secretiveness and fanaticism to Karapapakh religion". Bennigsen likewise stated that "a certain number of the Karapapakhs are Ali Ilahis, which somewhat hinders their assimilation by the Azeris".

Olson et al. lastly added that there were more than 10,000 Karapapakhs in the Soviet Union at the time, with most of them localized in Soviet Central Asia; small numbers of Karapapakhs had been able however to return to southern Georgia and northern Armenia in the 1980s. Some 30,000 and 60,000 Karapapakhs were reportedly living in Iran and Turkey respectively at the time. Groups of Karapapakh still live around Ardahan, Kars and Iğdır to this present day.

== Language ==
Karapapakh
- Native to: Turkey, Iran, Georgia, Azerbaijan
- Region: South Caucasus
- Ethnicity: Karapapakhs
- Extinct: 20th century
- Language family: Turkic: Common Turkic; Oghuz; Western Oghuz; Azerbaijani; Karapapakh

Language codes
- ISO 639-3: None (mis)
- Glottolog: None

The Karapapakhs originally mainly spoke their own western Oghuz language, which is closely related to Azerbaijani and Turkish. (Note: The second edition of the Encyclopaedia of Islam mentions that it is close to both "Āzerī and the Turkish of Turkey". The historian George Bournoutian only mentions that it is "close to present-day Azeri-Türki".) In the Georgian SSR of the Soviet Union, this language was often confused with Azerbaijani. Bearing similarities to the process of assimilation in the Soviet Union and Turkey, the Karapapakhs no longer speak their Turkic language and have completely switched to Turkish or Azerbaijani. (Note: The full switch to Turkish by the Karapapakhs in Turkey was already reported by the second edition of the Encyclopaedia of Islam.) Brent Brendemoen notes in Turkic-Iranian Contact Areas: Historical and Linguistic Aspects that the migration of the Karapapakhs (and Terekeme, amongst others) in modern times from Turkey's east has been responsible for bringing Arabic loanwords with Persian vocalism to isolated areas as far west as Kangal in Sivas.

In 1985, according to Richard Tapper, Karapapakhs in Naqadeh were linguistically and culturally Kurdicized, some of whom were Sunni, in contrast to other Azerbaijani Turks of the region.

== Traditional economy ==
The Karapapkhs were traditionally involved in sheep-rearing and a bit of agriculture.

== See also ==
- Ayrums
- Qajar Iran § Migration of Caucasian Muslims
- Azerbaijanis in Turkey
- Iranian Azerbaijanis
- Meskhetian Turks

== Sources ==
- Akiner, Shirin (1983). Islamic Peoples Of The Soviet Union. Kegan Paul International.
- Barthold, W. & Wixman, R. (1978). "Ḳarapapak̲h̲". In van Donzel, E.; Lewis, B.; Pellat, Ch. & Bosworth, C. E. (eds.). The Encyclopaedia of Islam, Second Edition. Volume IV: Iran–Kha. Leiden: E. J. Brill. ISBN 978-90-04-05745-6. OCLC 758278456.
- Bennigsen, Alexandre; Wimbush, S. Enders (1986). Muslims of the Soviet Empire: A Guide. C Hurst & Co Publishers Ltd.
- Bournoutian, George (2021). From the Kur to the Aras: A Military History of Russia's Move into the South Caucasus and the First Russo-Iranian War, 1801-1813. Brill.
- Bournoutian, George (1992). The Khanate of Erevan Under Qajar Rule, 1795-1828. Mazda Publishers.
- Bournoutian, George (2017). "The Population of the South Caucasus according to the 1897 General Census of the Russian Empire". Iran and the Caucasus. 21 (3): 324–340. doi:10.1163/1573384X-20170307.
- Brendemoen, Brent (2006). Johanson, Lars; Bulut, Christiane (eds.). Turkic-Iranian Contact Areas: Historical and Linguistic Aspects. Harrassowitz Verlag.
- Minorsky, V. (1997). "Suldūz". In Bosworth, C. E.; van Donzel, E.; Heinrichs, W. P. & Lecomte, G. (eds.). The Encyclopaedia of Islam, Second Edition. Volume IX: San–Sze. Leiden: E. J. Brill. ISBN 978-90-04-10422-8.
- Olson, James Stuart; Pappas, Lee Brigance; Pappas, Nicholas Charles, eds. (1994). An Ethnohistorical Dictionary of the Russian and Soviet Empires. Greenwoon Press.
- Rabi, Uzi; Ter-Oganov, Nugzar (2012). "The Military of Qajar Iran: The Features of an Irregular Army from the Eighteenth to the Early Twentieth Century". Iranian Studies. 45 (3): 333–354. doi:10.1080/00210862.2011.637776. S2CID 159730844.
- Tsutsiev, Arthur (2014). Atlas of the Ethno-Political History of the Caucasus. New Haven: Yale University Press.
- Wixman, Ronald (1984). Peoples of the USSR: An Ethnographic Handbook. M.E. Sharpe.
