= Ardahan Province =

Coordinates: 41°06′47″N 42°49′15″E

Ardahan Province Ardahan ili
- Province
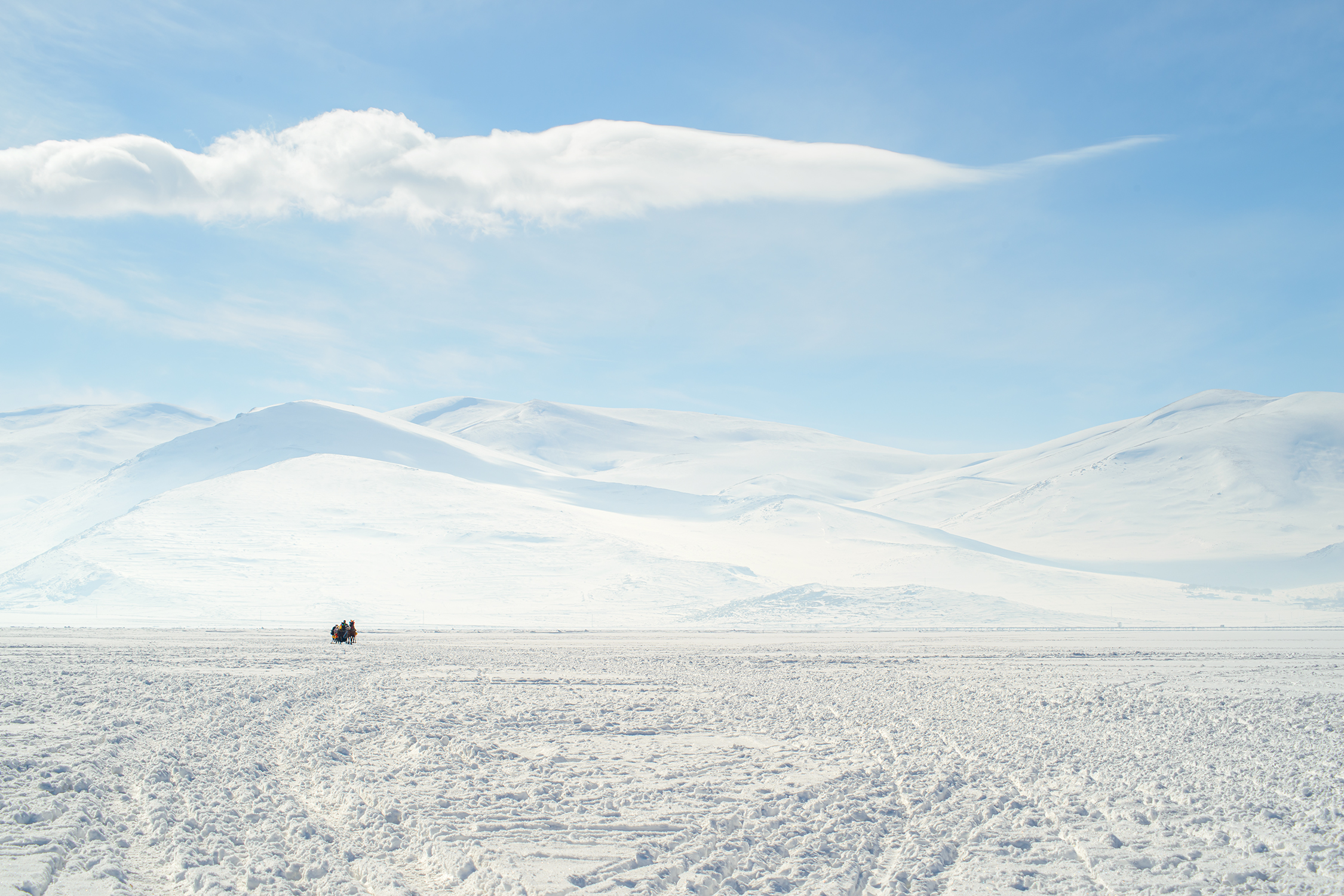
- Lake Çıldır

- Location of the province within Turkey
- Country: Turkey
- Seat: Ardahan

Government
  - Governor: Ömer Hilmi Yamlı
- Area: 4,934 km^{2} (1,905 sq mi)
- Population (2022): 92,481
  - Density: 18.74/km^{2} (48.55/sq mi)
- Time zone: UTC+3 (TRT)
- Area code: 0478
- Website: www.ardahan.gov.tr

Ardahan Province (Turkish: Ardahan ili; Kurdish: Parêzgeha Erdêxanê, Georgian: არტაანის რეგიონი, romanized: art'aanis regioni) is a province in the north-east of Turkey, bordering Georgia and Armenia. Its area is 4,934 km^{2}, and its population is 92,481 (2022). The provincial capital is the city of Ardahan. Ardahan borders the Turkish provinces of Erzurum, Artvin and Kars.

== Demographics ==
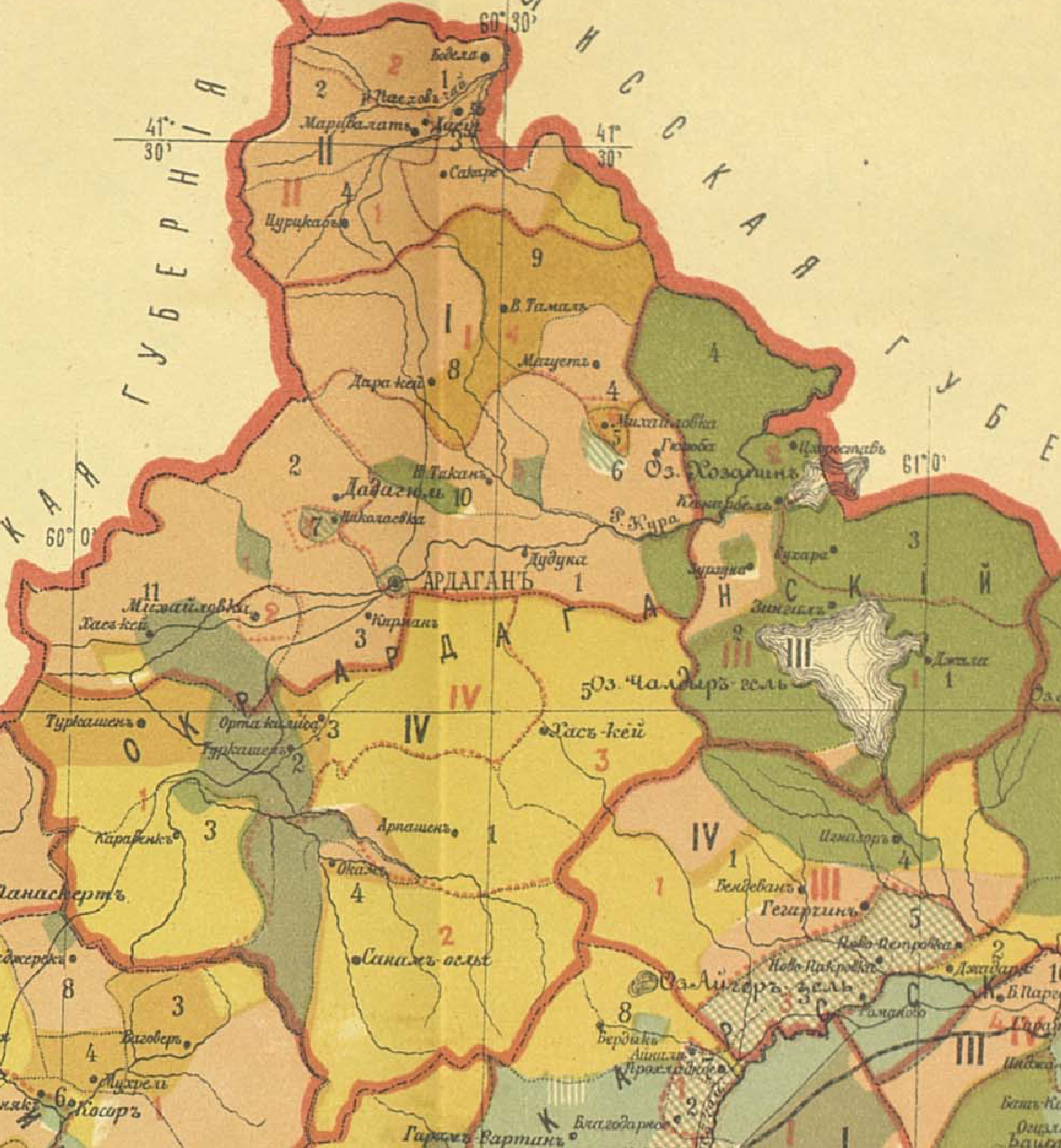
Ethnographic map of Ardahan okrug in 1902

In 1886, 43,643 people lived in Ardahan Vilayet of which 46.6% was Turkish, 16% was Kurdish, 14.3% Karapapakh, 12.9% Greek, 7.2% Turkmen, 2.4% Russian and 0.6% Armenian. The town of Ardahan had a population of 778 of which 51.8% was Turkish, 22.1% Russian, 18.1% Armenian and 6.2% Greek.

In the 1897 Russian Empire Census, Ardahan okrug had a population of 65,763 of which 42.6% was Turkish, 19.1% Kurdish, 12% Karapapakh, 11.9% Greek, 6.6% Turkmen and 2.9% Armenian. Slavs constituted 3.9% of the population. The town of Ardahan had a population of 4,142 of which 37.1% was Slavic, 31.7% Armenian, 18% Turkish and 2.6% Greek.

In 1908, Ardahan sancak had a population of 71,469 of which 41.6% was Turkish, 18.1% was Kurdish, 15.4% Greek, 14.4% Karapapakh, 7.9% Turkmen, 2.2% Russian and 0.4% Armenian.

In the first Turkish census taking place in 1927, Ardahan District had a population of 88,989 of which 85.8% spoke Turkish as first language, while 13.8% spoke Kurdish. 98.8% of the Kurdish-speaking population lived in Göle sub-district. In the same census, almost 100% of the population was Muslim. 14 Christians lived in the district. The district had a population of 104,911 in 1935.

== History ==
The first surviving record about this region is attributed to Strabo, who calls it Gogarene (Gugark) and mentions that it was a part of the Kingdom of Armenia, taken away from the Kingdom of Iberia. In the Middle Ages Ardahan served as an important transit point for goods arriving from the Abbasid Caliphate and departing to the regions around the Black Sea. During the 8th to 10th centuries the region was in hands of the Bagrationi princes of Tao-Klarjeti, and later part of Kingdom of Georgia between 11th to 15th centuries. It was a theatre of war during the Byzantine-Georgian wars. According to the Arab historian Yahya of Antioch, the Byzantines razed Ardahan and slaughtered its population in 1021. The Mongols took hold of the region in the 1230s but the Georgian princes of Samtskhe were able to recapture it in 1266. As a result of Peace of Amasya, signed in 1555 with the Safavid Persia, Ardahan passed to Ottoman hands and reorganized into the Ardahan sanjak as part of eyalet of Childir. In 1578 Ottomans appointed the former Georgian prince, Manuchar (who took the name of Mustafa after converting to Islam) as the first governor. From 1625 onwards the entire eyalet was a hereditary possession of the now-Muslim atabegs of Samtskhe, which administered it as hereditary governors, with some exceptions, until the mid-18th century.

In 1878, after the Russo-Turkish War (1877–1878), the region was incorporated into the Russian Empire, and until 1918 was known as Kars Oblast. The northern part of the province was the Democratic Republic of Georgia from 1919 to 1921 and the southern part of the province was the Democratic Republic of Armenia from 1919 to 1920, Ardahan was reclaimed by Turkey under the Treaty of Kars in 1921. Ardahan Province was created in 1992 from the northern part of Kars Province.

The construction of the Baku–Tbilisi–Ceyhan pipeline gave the local economy a brief boost from 2000 onwards.

== Geography ==
Ardahan province is located in the far north east of Turkey, where the eastern extremity of the high plateau of Eastern Anatolia converges with the Lesser Caucasus mountain range. It is consequently an area of very high altitude and severe winters. This is attractive open countryside which however spends many months of the year under snow. At this altitude temperatures on average reach −20 °C (−4 °F) and can drop below freezing all year round, including summer months.

The local economy depends on farming and raising livestock. Until 1993 Ardahan was a district of the province of Kars, becoming a province in its own right has meant more investment in infrastructure

There are two crossing points into the Samtskhe–Javakheti district of Georgia, one at Posof and the other at Çıldır. The Turkish military have a strong presence in this border district, another boost to the local economy.

=== Climate ===
The predominant climate in the Ardahan province is humid continental climate (Köppen climate classification Dfb) bordering on a subarctic climate (Dfc), with most large settlements in the province being located in lowest possible elevation areas, in attempt to avoid the year-round cold temperatures, thus staying just below the subarctic limit. Smaller locales, districts, villages and a significant portion of the landscape, exhibits a true subarctic climate (Dfc), being the second most widespread climate in the region.

== Districts ==
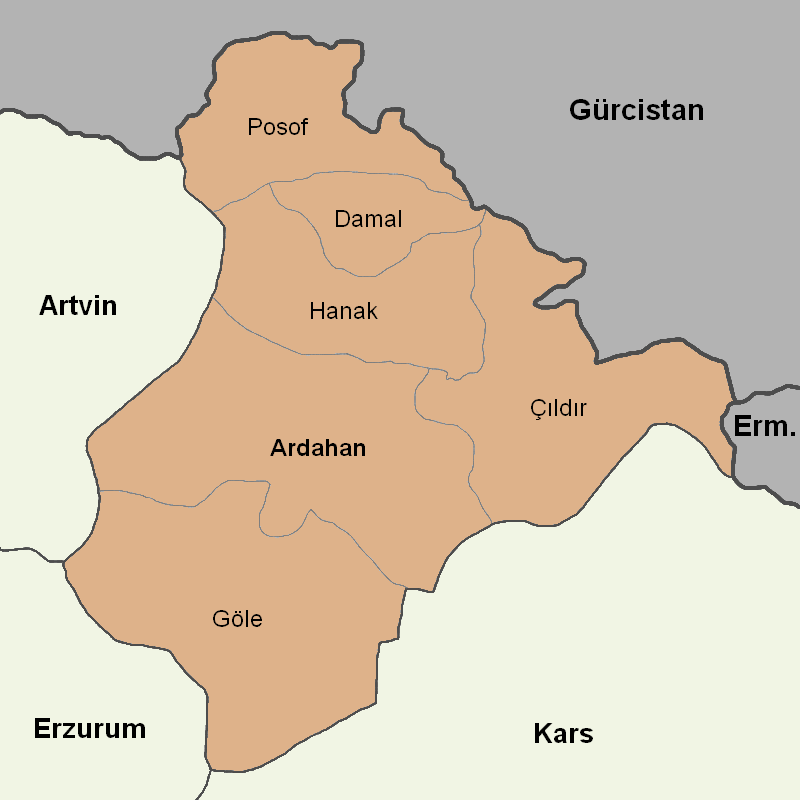

Ardahan province is divided into 6 districts (capital district in bold):

- **Ardahan**
- Çıldır
- Damal
- Göle
- Hanak
- Posof

== Cities and towns ==
- Ardahan City 17,171 inh.
- Göle City 6,231 inh.
- Hanak City 4,030 inh.
- Damal City 3,804 inh.
- Köprülü Town 2,126 inh.
- Posof City 1,810 inh.
- Çıldır City 1,502 inh.

== Places of interest ==
- There are a number of medieval castles in the district including Şeytan Castle.
- Lake Çıldır
- Phantom of Atatürk in city of Damal

There is a unique natural incident, between mid June and mid July at sunset, depending on angles of the sunrays. An image resembling the silhouette of Atatürk's face can be seen as a shadow on the hillside. It was first seen by a shepherd who was with his herd over the hill.

== See also ==
- List of populated places in Ardahan Province

== Bibliography ==
- Şimşek, Oğuz. "Türkiye Cumhuriyeti'nin İlk Genel Nüfus Sayımında Ardahan Vilâyeti'nin Nüfus Özellikleri". BELGÜ (in Turkish): 209.
