= Tsirekaantubani =

Tsirekaantubani (Georgian: ცირეკაანთუბანი) is a now-vanished village in the historical region of Samtskhe, today in the Posof district of Ardahan Province in Turkey.

== History ==
The Georgian place name Tsirekaantubani (ცირეკაანთუბანი) was recorded as Sirekatuban (سیرە كتوبان) in the Ottoman land-survey register (mufassal defter) of 1595 and the Ottoman cebe defter (1694-1732). This toponym likely derives from the Georgian family name Tsirekidze (ცირეკიძე). Indeed, in the 1595 Ottoman detailed register, the first-ranked head of household was named Aghdgomel Tsirekidze (აღდგომელ ცირეკიძე).

The Samtskhe region, where the village of Tsirekaantubani is located, is part of historical Georgia. Indeed, the Ottomans completely captured this region from the Georgians in 1578.

According to a land-survey register (mufassal defter) dated 1595, titled Defter-i Mufassal-i Vilayet-i Gürcistan, the village of Tsirekaantubani was part of the Güney district (nahiye) of the Poshov district (liva) within the Vilayet-i Gürcistan. Its population consisted of nine Christian households, and the heads of households and their fathers bore names such as Ağdgomel, Gubela, Revaza, Mososa, Gabriel, and Obala. Wheat, barley, rye, and flaxseed were cultivated in Tsirekaantubani, along with beekeeping and raising pigs and sheep. The village had a watermill. The hamlet of Tsirekaantubani was called Tavtziteli (თავწითელი) and was recorded in Ottoman as Tavzitel (تاوزتل). The name Tavtsiteli (თავწითელი) is a compound name consisting of the Georgian words "tavi" (თავი) and "tsiteli" (წითელი).

The village of Tsirekaantubani had the same administrative title in the Çıldır Province's pocket register covering the period 1694-1732. In 1129 AH (1716/1717), the village's revenue was 4,000 akçe, and the area was allocated to a man named Dervish Mehmed.

Tsirekaantubani is not included in later records. Sergi Jikia, a Georgian Turkologist who published the Ottoman land-survey register (mufassal defter), wrote that the exact location of this settlement is impossible to determine, but that it was located in the vicinity of the villages of Poma (ფომა), Chilvana (ჭილვანა), and Varkhana (ვარხანა). According to Jikia, Tsirekaantubani appears in Russian archival documents as Siriketuban (Сирикетубань) and Soroketuban (Сорокетубан). However, the fact that the Russian name was not mentioned in the Poskhov district (uchastok) in the Russian population register of 1886 shows that the village of Tsirekaantubani had ceased to be a village before.
