= Soviet territorial claims against Turkey =

Attempts to claim eastern Anatolia

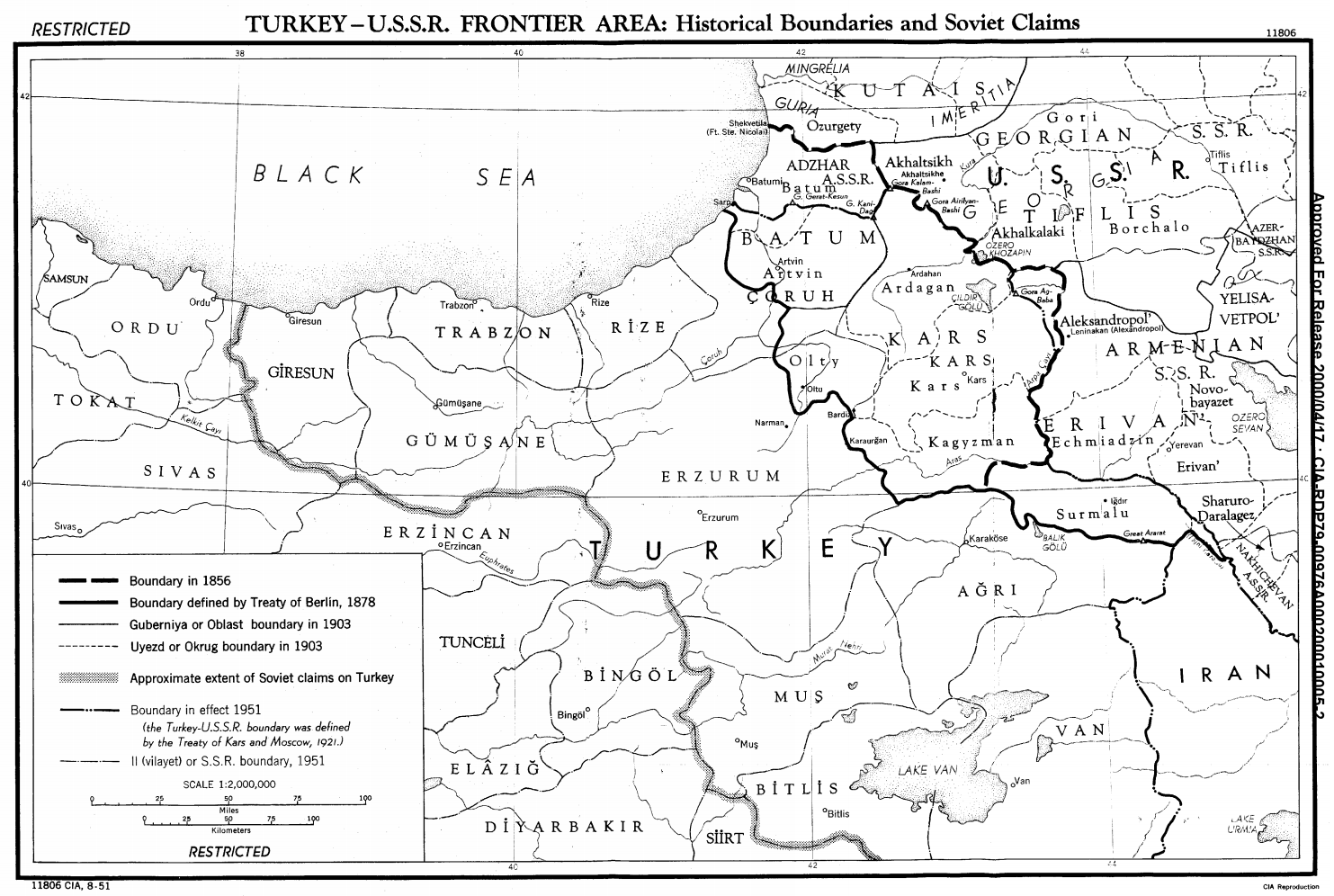
CIA map of the Soviet-Turkish frontier area

Territorial claims against Turkey were advanced by the Soviet Union following the end of World War II, with the onset of the Cold War. The territory was claimed in the name of the Armenian SSR and the Georgian SSR. The disputed area corresponded to historical Armenian and Georgian regions that were annexed by Turkey in the Treaty of Moscow and the Treaty of Kars.

Georgian claims centered on the Black Sea region, especially the areas of Tao-Klarjeti and Lazistan. Armenian claims centered on historical Western Armenia, which comprised a significant portion of the ancestral homeland of the Armenian people prior to the 1915 Armenian genocide. The Soviet claims, if successful, would have strengthened Moscow's position in the Black Sea region and West Asia.

== Background ==
The Soviet Union had long objected to the Montreux Convention of 1936 which gave Turkey sole control over shipping between the Bosporus Strait, an essential waterway for Russian exports. When the 1925 Soviet-Turkish Treaty of Friendship and Neutrality expired in 1945, the Soviet side chose not to renew the treaty. According to Nikita Khrushchev, Deputy Premier Lavrentiy Beria goaded his fellow Georgian Joseph Stalin to claim historical Georgian and Armenian territories that had been annexed to Turkey in the Moscow and Kars treaties. Stalin eventually agreed, and on 7 June 1945, Soviet Foreign Minister Vyacheslav Molotov informed the Turkish ambassador in Moscow that the provinces of Kars, Ardahan and Artvin should be returned to the Soviet Union in the name of both the Georgian and the Armenian Socialist Soviet Republics.

Molotov asserted that the territorial dispute would have to be resolved before the conclusion of a new Soviet-Turkish treaty. He argued that while the Soviets normalized their border with Poland since territorial cessions to the country during Soviet weakness in 1921, similar cessions to Turkey were never legitimized by renegotiation since that time. Turkey itself was in no condition to fight a war with the Soviet Union, which had emerged as a superpower after the Second World War.

== Claims ==
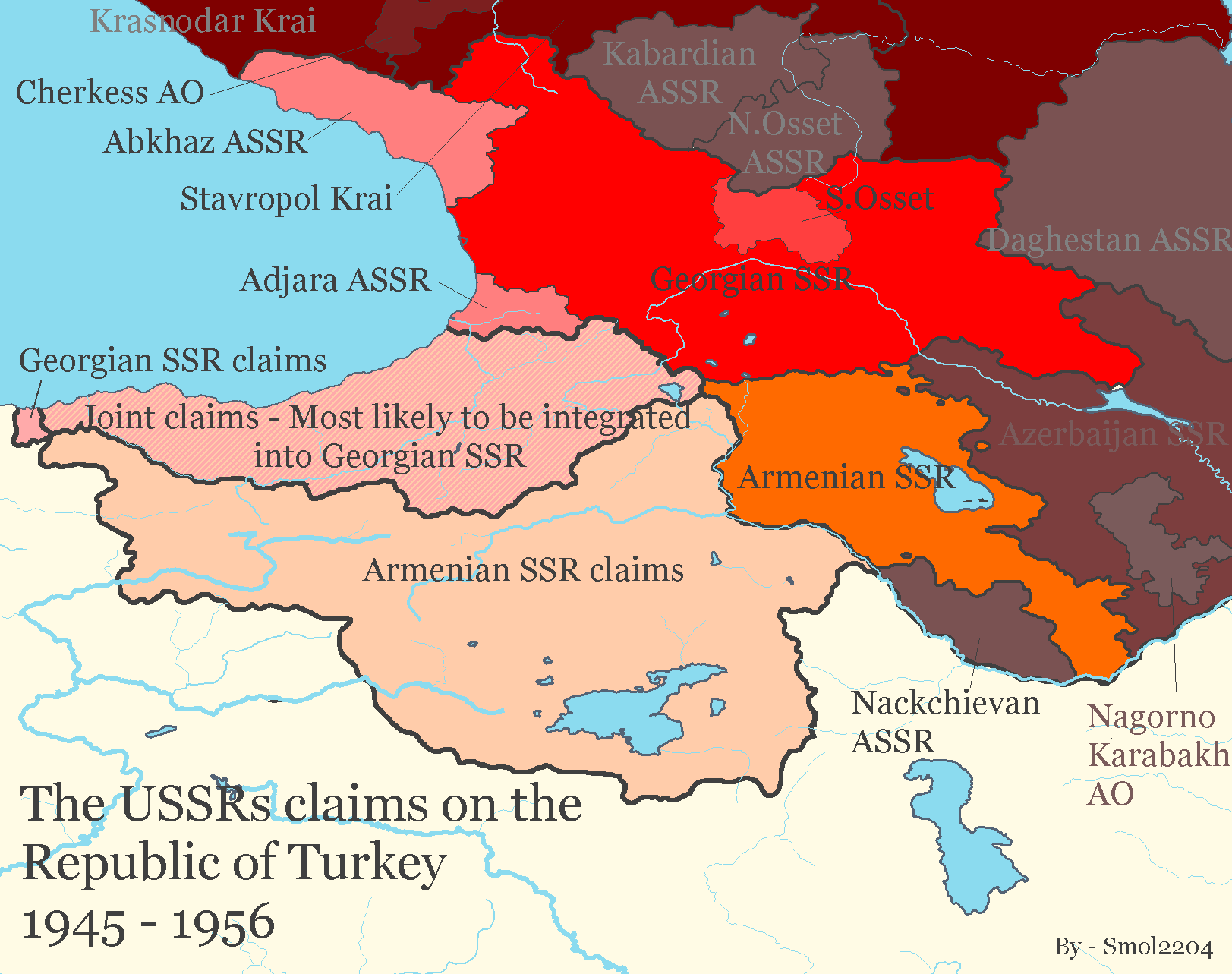
Map displaying Soviet Armenian and Georgian claims on Turkey

In December 1945, the central Georgian and Russian newspapers published a letter on Georgian claims against Turkey written by academics Simon Janashia and Niko Berdzenishvili. The last section of the report was devoted to Lazistan, or Chanetia. The borders of this territory extended from the southern section of the Batum oblast to the west along the Black Sea coast to the Termedon River near the town of Terme, embracing the capes of Rize and Trabzon. The report implied that, in addition to the districts of Artvin, Ardahan, and Olti, Soviet Georgia could lay claim to additional historical regions, including Tortum, İspir, and eastern Lazistan, stretching to the area of Trabzon.

There were three Soviet plans concerning the amount of territory that Turkey should cede:

- The first plan included the territory of the former Kars oblast (with Ani, Kars, and Ardahan), as well as the former Artvin okrug and the former Surmalu uezd (Mount Ararat and its surroundings). These territories were part of the Russian Empire from 1878 until 1918 and then part of the First Republic of Armenia and the Democratic Republic of Georgia in 1918–1921.
- The second plan included Soviet Georgian claims along the Chorokh River and eastern Lazistan, and Soviet Armenian claims on the Alashkert plain (including the city of Bayazet), in addition to Kars and Surmalu.
- The third plan included most of Black Sea region of Turkey (Trabzon, Gumushane, and Giresun) and most of historical Western Armenia (Erzurum, Van, Mush, and Bitlis).

In the three years (1946–1948) after the World War II, about 150,000 ethnic Armenians from the Armenian diaspora had migrated to the Armenian SSR. The Soviet government encouraged this repatriation in part to support its claims.

== Failure ==
Strategically, the British and the Americans opposed the Soviet territorial claims against Turkey. As the Cold War began, the American government saw the claims as part of an "expansionist drive by a Communist empire" and viewed them as reminiscent of Nazi irredentist designs over the Sudetenland in Czechoslovakia. The US State Department was concerned about the strategic military significance of the Kars Plateau to the Soviets. They concluded that their earlier support for Armenia since President Woodrow Wilson (1913–1921) had expired since the loss of Armenian independence.

The State Department advised President Harry Truman to support Turkey and to oppose the Soviet demands, which he did. Washington's firm opposition to Soviet-backed claims on Turkey and Iran led to the crushing and re-annexation of the Kurdish Republic of Mahabad (1946–1947) and the Azerbaijan People's Government (1945–1946) by Iran. Turkey joined the anti-Soviet NATO military alliance in 1952. Following the death of Stalin in 1953, the Soviet government renounced its territorial claims on Turkey, as part of an effort to improve relations with the Middle Eastern country and its alliance partner, the United States.

== See also ==
- Armenia–Turkey border
- Azerbaijan–Turkey border
- Georgia–Turkey border
- Turkish Straits crisis

== Bibliography ==
- Goff, Krista A. (2020). Nested Nationalism: Making and Unmaking Nations in the Soviet Caucasus. Ithaca, NY: Cornell University Press. ISBN 978-1-5017-5327-5.
- Hille, Charlotte (2010). State Building and Conflict Resolution in the Caucasus. Leiden: Brill. ISBN 978-9004179011.
- Khrushchev, Nikita S. (2006). Sergei Khrushchev (ed.). Memoirs of Nikita Khrushchev: Reformer, 1945–1964. Vol. 2. Translated by George Shriver. University Park, PA: Penn State University Press. ISBN 978-0271058597.
- Panossian, Razmik (2006). The Armenians: From Kings and Priests to Merchants and Commissars. New York: Columbia University Press. ISBN 978-0231139267.
- Rieber, Alfred J. (2015). Stalin and the Struggle for Supremacy in Eurasia. Cambridge: Cambridge University Press. ISBN 978-1107426443.
- Roberts, Geoffrey (2011). Molotov: Stalin's Cold Warrior. Washington, D.C.: Potomac Books. pp. 107–108. ISBN 978-1-57488-945-1.
- Suny, Ronald Grigor (1993). Looking toward Ararat. Bloomington: Indiana University Press. ISBN 978-0253207739.
