= Gomani, Posof =

Village in Samtskhe region, Georgia

Gomani (Georgian: გომანი) is a vanished village in the Turkish part of the historical Samtskhe region. Its settlement was located in the Posof District of Ardahan Province in Turkey.

== History ==
Gomani (გომანი) was recorded as Goman (كومان) in the Ottoman land-survey register (mufassal defter) of 1595. This place name may be derived from the Georgian word "gomi" (გომი), meaning "stall". Indeed, a village formerly known as Gomi in Georgia is now called Gomani (ka:გომანი).

The historical Samtskhe region, where the village of Gomani is located, remains within the borders of Georgia, except for a small part. The Ottomans completely conquered this region from the Georgians in 1578.

Gomani was included in the Kuzey district (nahiye) of Poshov Liva, within the "Georgian Province" (tr:Gürcistan Vilayeti), in the Ottoman land-survey register (mufassal defter) of 1595. By this time, the village was completely deserted. However, a revenue of 2,000 akçe was recorded for the village.

Gomani is also listed as Goman (كومان) in the Ottoman cebe defter of Childir Eyalet, covering the period 1694–1732. In this register, the village, which occupied the same administrative position, had a revenue of 2,000 akçe in 1115 AH (1703/1704), and this revenue was granted first to a person named Mehmed and then to a person named Osman.

Georgian Turkologist Sergi Jikia, who published the Ottoman land-survey register (mufassal defter), noted that the village of Gomani is incorrectly referred to as "Kuban" (Кубан) in Russian archival documents. However, he wrote that the location of this vanished village could not be determined exactly. Indeed, the fact that it was not included as a village in the Poshov district of Ardahan province in the Russian census of 1886 shows that Gomani had ceased to be a village before this date.
