= Ardahan okrug =

Coordinates: 41°06′40″N 42°42′08″E

Ardahan okrug Ардаганский округ
- Okrug
- Coat of arms

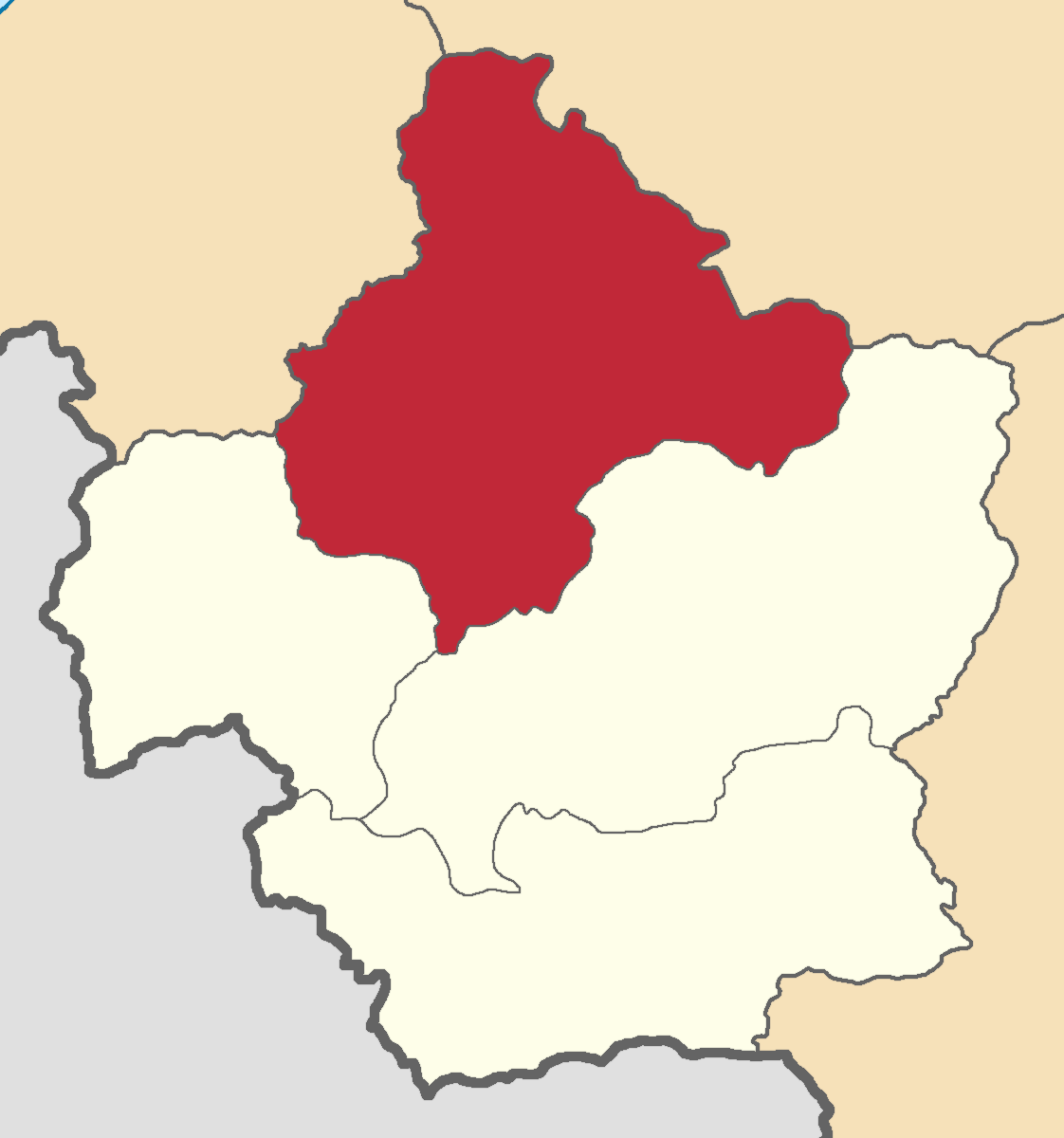
- Location in the Kars Oblast
- Country: Russian Empire
- Viceroyalty: Caucasus
- Oblast: Kars
- Established: 1878
- Treaty of Brest-Litovsk: 3 March 1918
- Capital: Ardagan (present-day Ardahan)

Area
  - Total: 5,596.88 km^{2} (2,160.97 sq mi)

Population (1916)
  - Total: 89,036
  - Density: 15.908/km^{2} (41.202/sq mi)
  - Urban: 3.56%
  - Rural: 96.44%

The Ardahan okrug (Note: Russian: Ардаганский округ, pre-reform orthography: Ардаганскій округъ, romanized: Ardaganskiy okrug [ɐrdəɡənskʲɪj ɐkrʊk]; Turkish: Ardahan Okrugu [aɾdahan okɾuɡu]) was a district (okrug) of the Kars Oblast of the Russian Empire between 1878 and 1918. The district was eponymously named for its administrative center, the town of Ardagan (present-day Ardahan), presently part of the Ardahan Province of Turkey. The okrug bordered with the Kars okrug to the south, the Olti okrug in the west, the Batum Oblast in the north, the Tiflis Governorate in the northeast, and from 1883 to 1903 the Kutais Governorate whilst the latter included the Artvin and Batum okrugs.

== History ==
The Ardahan okrug was one of the four territorial administrative subunits (counties) of the Kars oblast created after its annexation into the Russian Empire in 1878 through the Treaty of San Stefano, following the defeat of the Ottoman Empire.

During the First World War, the Kars Oblast became the site of intense battles between the Russian Caucasus Army supplemented by Armenian volunteers and the Ottoman Third Army, the latter of whom was successful in briefly occupying Ardahan on 25 December 1914 before they were dislodged in early January 1915.

On 3 March 1918, in the aftermath of the October Revolution the Russian SFSR ceded the entire Kars Oblast including the Ardahan okrug through the Treaty of Brest-Litovsk to the Ottoman Empire, who had been unreconciled with its loss of the territory since 1878. Despite the ineffectual resistance of the Transcaucasian Democratic Federative Republic which had initially rejected the aforementioned treaty, the Ottoman Third Army was successful in occupying the Kars Oblast and forcefully expelling its 100,000 panic-stricken Armenian inhabitants.

The Ottoman Ninth Army under the command of Yakub Shevki Pasha, the occupying force of the district by the time of the Mudros Armistice, were permitted to winter in Kars until early 1919, after which on 7 January 1919 Major General G.T. Forestier-Walker ordered their complete withdrawal to the pre-1914 Ottoman-frontier. Intended to hinder the westward expansion of the fledgling Armenian and Georgian republics into the Kars Oblast, Yukub Shevki backed the emergence of the short-lived South-West Caucasus Republic with moral support, also furnishing it with weapons, ammunition and instructors.

The South-West Caucasus Republic administered the Ardahan okrug and neighboring formerly occupied districts for three months before provoking British intervention by order of General G.F. Milne, leading to its capitulation by Armenian and British forces on 10 April 1919. Consequently, the Kars Oblast largely came under the Armenian civil governorship of Stepan Korganian who wasted no time in facilitating the repatriation of the region's exiled refugees.

Despite the apparent defeat of the Ottoman Empire, Turkish agitators were reported by Armenian intelligence to have been freely roaming the countryside of Kars encouraging sedition among the Muslim villages, culminating in a series of anti-Armenian uprisings on 1 July 1919.

The Kars Oblast for the third time in six years saw invading Turkish troops, this time under the command of General Kâzım Karabekir in September 1920 during the Turkish-Armenian War. The disastrous war for Armenia resulted in the permanent expulsion of the region's ethnic Armenian population, many who inexorably remained befalling massacre, resulting in the region being integrated into the Republic of Turkey through the Treaty of Alexandropol on 3 December 1920. Turkey's annexation of Kars and the adjacent Surmalu Uyezd was confirmed in the treaties of Kars and Moscow in 1921, by virtue of the new Soviet regime in Armenia.

== Administrative divisions ==
The prefectures (участки, uchastki) of the Ardahan okrug were:

Name	Administrative centre	1912 population	Area
Ardaganskiy prefecture (Ардаганский участок)	Ardagan (Ardahan)	26,649	1,599.75 square versts (1,820.62 km^{2}; 702.94 mi^{2})
Gyolskiy prefecture (Гёльский участок)	Okam (Çayırbaşı)	21,161	1,849.68 square versts (2,105.05 km^{2}; 812.76 mi^{2})
Poskhovskiy prefecture (Посховский участок)	Damavliya (Yurtbekler)	15,586	506.45 square versts (576.37 km^{2}; 222.54 mi^{2})
Chaldyrskiy prefecture (Чалдырский участок)	Zurzuna (Çıldır)	15,511	962.02 square versts (1,094.84 km^{2}; 422.72 mi^{2})

== Demographics ==
=== Russian Empire Census ===
According to the Russian Empire Census, the Ardahan okrug had a population of 65,763 on 28 January [O.S. 15 January] 1897, including 34,930 men and 30,833 women. The plurality of the population indicated Turkish to be their mother tongue, with significant Kurdish, Karapapakh, Greek, and Turkmen speaking minorities.

Linguistic composition of the Ardahan okrug in 1897
Language	Native speakers	%
Turkish	28,047	42.65
Kurdish	12,565	19.11
Karapapakh	7,874	11.97
Greek	7,839	11.92
Turkmen	4,328	6.58
Russian	1,966	2.99
Armenian	1,918	2.92
Ukrainian	383	0.58
Polish	207	0.31
Persian	137	0.21
Georgian	137	0.21
Jewish	113	0.17
Ossetian	47	0.07
Lithuanian	45	0.07
Tatar (Note: Before 1918, Azerbaijanis were generally known as "Tatars". This term, employed by the Russians, referred to Turkic-speaking Muslims of the South Caucasus. After 1918, with the establishment of the Azerbaijan Democratic Republic and "especially during the Soviet era", the Tatar group identified itself as "Azerbaijani".)	37	0.06
German	30	0.05
Avar-Andean	20	0.03
Belarusian	8	0.01
Dargin	7	0.01
Bashkir	1	0.00
Other	54	0.08
TOTAL	65,763	100.00

=== Kavkazskiy kalendar ===
According to the 1917 publication of Kavkazskiy kalendar, the Ardahan okrug had a population of 89,036 on 14 January [O.S. 1 January] 1916, including 44,387 men and 44,649 women, 82,260 of whom were the permanent population, and 6,376 were temporary residents. The statistics indicated the town Ardahan to be overwhelmingly Armenian with a significant Sunni Muslim minority. Conversely, the rest of the okrug was mainly Sunni Muslim, with sizeable Kurdish, Roma, and Yazidi minorities:

Nationality	Urban		Rural		TOTAL	
Nationality	Number	%	Number	%	Number	%
Sunni Muslims (Note: Primarily Turco-Tatars.)	778	24.57	45,348	52.81	46,126	51.81
Kurds	28	0.88	18,136	21.12	18,164	20.40
Roma	361	11.40	11,700	13.63	12,061	13.55
Yazidis	0	0.00	6,543	7.62	6,543	7.35
Armenians	1,708	53.93	1,036	1.21	2,744	3.08
Russians	270	8.53	2,240	2.61	2,510	2.82
Asiatic Christians	0	0.00	755	0.88	755	0.85
Shia Muslims (Note: Primarily Tatars.)	0	0.00	82	0.10	82	0.09
Georgians	18	0.57	13	0.02	31	0.03
North Caucasians	0	0.00	8	0.01	8	0.01
Other Europeans	0	0.00	8	0.01	8	0.01
Jews	4	0.13	0	0.00	4	0.00
TOTAL	3,167	100.00	85,869	100.00	89,036	100.00

== Settlements ==
According to the 1897 census, there were 12 settlements in the Ardahan okrug with a population over 500 inhabitants. The religious composition of the settlements was as follows:

Name	Armenian Apostolic	Muslim	Eastern Orthodox	Male	Female	TOTAL
Ardahan (Ардаган, Ardagan)	1,317 (Note: Includes Armenian Catholics.)	879	1,334	2,962	1,180	4,142
Süngülü (Арила, Arila)		732		388	344	732
Çetinsu (Беберек (Беберяк), Beberek (Beberyak))			543	248	299	547
Binbaşak (Гюгюба, Gyugyuba)		501		264	237	501
Çamlıçatak (Гюляберт, Gyulyabert)			764	394	394	788
Doğruyol (Джала, Dzhala)		737		385	363	748
Kenarbel (Канарбель, Kanarbel)		500		275	233	508
Ortakent (Накалакеви (Накалакей))		736		390	346	736
Yanlızçam (Синдизгем (Синдисгем), Sindizgem (Sindisgem))			793	391	411	802
Aşıkşenlik (Сухара, Sukhara)		955		497	466	963
Aşıkzülali (Цурцкаб, Tsurtskab)		826		419	407	826
Çatalköprü (Шадеван, Shadevan)		562		265	297	562
TOTAL	1,317	6,428	3,434	6,878	4,977	11,855

== Bibliography ==
- Bournoutian, George A. (2018). Armenia and Imperial Decline: The Yerevan Province, 1900–1914. Milton Park, Abingdon, Oxon: Routledge. ISBN 978-1-351-06260-2. OCLC 1037283914.
- Hovannisian, Richard G. (1971). The Republic of Armenia. Vol. 1: The First Year, 1918–1919. Berkeley: University of California Press. ISBN 978-0520019843.
- Кавказский календарь на 1913 год [Caucasian calendar for 1913] (in Russian) (68th ed.). Tiflis: Tipografiya kantselyarii Ye.I.V. na Kavkaze, kazenny dom. 1913. Archived from the original on 19 April 2022.
- Кавказский календарь на 1917 год [Caucasian calendar for 1917] (in Russian) (72nd ed.). Tiflis: Tipografiya kantselyarii Ye.I.V. na Kavkaze, kazenny dom. 1917. Archived from the original on 4 November 2021.
- Tsutsiev, Arthur (2014). Atlas of the Ethno-Political History of the Caucasus (PDF). Translated by Nora Seligman Favorov. New Haven: Yale University Press. ISBN 9780300153088. Archived (PDF) from the original on 17 June 2023.
