= Poma, Posof =

Poma (Georgian: ფომა) is a village that has disappeared from the historical Samtskhe region of Georgia. The settlement is now within the boundaries of the village of Binbaşıeminbey (formerly Chilvana), which is part of the Posof District of Ardahan Province in Turkey.

== History ==
The historical Samtskhe region, where the village of Poma was located, is still within the borders of Georgia today, with the exception of a small part. The Ottomans completely conquered this region and the village in 1578.

The village of Poma is mentioned as Poma (پومە) in the Ottoman land-survey register (mufassal defter) of 1595. In this register, the village is recorded together with a hamlet named "Chititskaro" (Georgian: ჩიტიწყარო). Chititskaro, meaning ‘bird spring’, is written as "Chidizgharo" (چدزغرە) in the register. At that time, the village of Poma was located within the Province of Georgia (Vilayet-i Gürcistan), in the Güney district (nahiye) of the Poskhov liva. Its population consisted of 12 Christian households, whose heads bore Georgian names. The village engaged in the cultivation of wheat, barley, rye, and flaxseed, as well as beekeeping, and raised sheep and pigs.

The village of Poma was also recorded as Poma (پومە) in the Ottoman cebe defter covering the period 1694-1732 in the Childir Eyalet and had the same administrative status. In 1126 AH (1714/1715), the village's revenue was 500 akçe, and it was assigned to someone named Hasan.

Sergi Jikia, the Georgian Turkologist who published the detailed register in question, noted that the name Poma also appears as Poma (Russian: Пома) in Russian sources. However, the fact that it did not appear as a village in the Poskhov district (uchastok) in the 1886 census indicates that Poma ceased to be a village. Indeed, Poma is now a neighbourhood of the village of Binbaşıeminbey and is also known as Puma and Derinsu.
