= Çayırçimen, Posof =

Çayırçimen
- Village
- Location within Turkey
- Coordinates: 41°33′N 42°44′E
- Country: Turkey
- Province: Ardahan
- District: Posof
- Population (2021): 44
- Time zone: UTC+3 (TRT)

Çayırçimen, also known as Lamiani or Lomiani, is a village in the Posof District, Ardahan Province, Turkey. Its population is 44 (2021).

== History ==
The old name of Çayırçimen village is Lamyan, according to some Turkish sources. The Russian administration registered the village under the name Lamian / Lomian (Ламиан / Ломиан) in 1886. "Lomian" may be derived from the Georgian word lomi (ლომი), meaning "lion", thus, lomiani (ლომიანი; "lion"). However, the name of the village deriving from the Georgian word lami (ლამი), meaning "river sand", seems more likely. Lamiani (ლამიანი) also means "sandy".

Çayırçimen is located in historical Samtsche, one of the regions that formed Georgia in medieval times. The Ottomans captured this region from the Georgians in the mid-16th century. Although the neighboring village Şuatskali (today Gönülaçan) is included in the Ottoman detailed book called Defter-i Mufassal-i Vilayet-i Georgia dated 1595, Çayırçimen is not mentioned among the villages of the southern subdistrict of the Poshov liva.

When the Ottoman Empire left the Ardahan region to Russia with the Treaty of Berlin signed after the 93 Harbi War, the village of Çayırçimen remained outside the Ottoman sovereignty area. In the population determination made by the Russian administration in 1886, Çayırçimen village was connected to the Posof District (uçastok) of Ardahan. The village has 81 people recorded as "Turks".

Çayırçimen remained within the borders of independent Georgia for a while after the Russians withdrew from the region at the end of the First World War. While the Red Army's occupation of Georgia was continuing, Çayırçimen was left to Turkey in accordance with the Moscow Treaty signed between the Ankara Government and Soviet Russia on March 16, 1921.

Çayırçimen was recorded as Lamyan (لامیان) in the Ottoman village list dated 1928. At that time, Çayırçimen was connected to the Cilvana township in the Poshof district of Kars Province. The village had the same administrative position in the 1940 general census, and its population is 164 people. Since Çayırçimen was not Turkish, the name of the village was changed to Çayırçimen in 1959 with Law No. 7267. In the 1965 general census, the population of Çayırçimen village consisted of 272 people and only 42 people (~15%) could read and write.

== Geography ==
The village is 98 km (61 mi) away from Ardahan city center and 17 km (10.5 mi) away from Posof District center.
