= Doğrular, Posof =

Doğrular
- Neighbourhood
- Location in Turkey
- Coordinates: 41°30′40″N 42°42′40″E
- Country: Turkey
- Province: Ardahan
- District: Posof
- Municipality: Posof
- Population (2021): 65
- Time zone: UTC+3 (TRT)

Doğrular is a neighbourhood of the town Posof, Posof District, Ardahan Province, Turkey. Its population is 65 (2021).
