= Erim =

Erim or ERIM may refer to:

- Environmental Research Institute of Michigan, an organization in the United States that develops remote sensing technology
- Erasmus Research Institute of Management, the joint research institute of the Rotterdam School of Management and the Erasmus School of Economics, both at Erasmus University Rotterdam
- ERIM (army Sumerogram), the capital letter-(majuscule) sumerogram for the Akkadian language word army, or "troops"

== People ==
- Kenan Erim (1929–1990), Turkish archaeologist
- Kerim Erim (1894–1952), Turkish mathematician
- Nihat Erim (1912–1980), Turkish politician

== Places ==
- Erim, Posof, a village in the district of Posof, Ardahan Province, Turkey
