= Sepiskhevi =

Sepiskhevi (Georgian: სეფისხევი}) is a village that has disappeared from the historical Artani region of Georgia. The settlement is now located in the central district of Ardahan Province in Turkey.

== History ==
Sepiskhevi (სეფისხევი) is composed of the Georgian words ‘sepe’ (სეფე) and “khevi” (ხევი) and means something like ‘royal valley’.

The Artani region, where the village of Sepishevi is located, was one of the regions that made up Georgia in the Middle Ages. Indeed, the Ottomans seized this region from the Georgians in the 16th century, following their 1549 campaign in Georgia.

The name Sepiskhevi appears as Sepishev (سپسخو) in the Ottoman land-survey register (mufassal defter) of 1595. At that time, this settlement belonged to the "Kuzey" district (nahiye) of the Ardahan-i Büzürg province (liva). Its population consisted of 19 Christian households, and the heads of these households bore Georgian names. The village engaged in wheat and barley farming, beekeeping, and sheep and pig breeding.

Sepiskhevi village held the same administrative position under the name Sepishev (سپسخو) in the Ottoman cebe defter covering the period 1694-1732 in the Childir Eyalet. In 1115 AH (1703/1704), the village, with a yield of 6,000 akçe, was assigned to a person named Zülfikar.

Sepiskhevi village is mentioned in the 1595 in the Ottoman land-survey register (mufassal defter) as "Gogasheni" (გოგაშენი) and "Küçük Vardosani" (პატარა ბურდოსანი). The fact that this settlement did not appear in the Ardahan district (uchastok) of the Ardahan Okrug in the 1886 Russian census indicates that it ceased to be a village before that date.
