= Sadgomi =

Sadgomi (Georgian: სადგომი) is a village that has disappeared from the historical Artani region. The settlement area of this village was located near the village of Tepeler (formerly Komki), which is part of the central district of Ardahan Province in Turkey.

== History ==
Sadgomi (Georgian: სადგომი) is a Georgian word meaning "dwelling place", "stall" and "lair".

The historical Artani region, where the village of Sadgomi is located, was one of the regions that formed Georgia in the Middle Ages. Indeed, the Ottomans seized this region and the village from the Georgians in the mid-16th century.

Sadgomi village was recorded as "Sadgom" (صادكوم) in the Ottoman land-survey register (mufassal defter) of 1595. At that time, this settlement was part of the Kuzey district (nahiye) of the Ardahan-i Büzürg province (liva) within the "Vilayet of Gürcistan" (Vilayet-i Gürcistan). Its population consisted of 8 households, all Christian, and most of the heads of households bore Georgian names. Wheat and barley farming, beekeeping, and sheep breeding were practised in the village. There were two water mills.

Sadgomi held the same administrative status as Sadgom (صادكوم) in the Ottoman cebe defter covering the period 1694-1732 in the Province of Çıldır. The village was assigned to a man named Ali in 1119 AH (1707/1708) in exchange for a tax of 2,000 akçe.

Sergi Jikia, the Georgian Turkologist who published the Ottoman land-survey register (mufassal defter) of 1595, wrote that this settlement was located near the village of Komki, based on a note in the register. However, although the 1886 Russian census lists the village of Komki or Konk (Конкъ) in the Ardahan district (uchastok) of the Ardahan Okrug, no village named Sadgomi is recorded. It appears that the village had been abandoned prior to this date.
