= Sarıçiçek, Posof =

Sarıçiçek
- Village
- Location within Turkey
- Coordinates: 41°34′20″N 42°40′33″E
- Country: Turkey
- Province: Ardahan
- District: Posof
- Population (2021): 25
- Time zone: UTC+3 (TRT)

Sarıçiçek is a village in the Posof District, Ardahan Province, Turkey. Its population is 25 (2021).
