= Kaleönü, Posof =

Kaleönü
- Village
- Location within Turkey
- Coordinates: 41.4221°N 42.6177°E
- Country: Turkey
- Province: Ardahan
- District: Posof
- Population (2021): 89
- Time zone: UTC+3 (TRT)

Kaleönü is a village in the Posof District, Ardahan Province, Turkey. Its population is 89 (2021).
