= Kayınlı, Posof =

Kayınlı
- Village
- Location within Turkey
- Coordinates: 41.5575°N 42.7411°E
- Country: Turkey
- Province: Ardahan
- District: Posof
- Population (2021): 25
- Time zone: UTC+3 (TRT)

Kayınlı is a village in the Posof District, Ardahan Province, Turkey. Its population is 25 (2021).
