= Tepeler, Ardahan =

Tepeler
- Village
- Location within Turkey
- Coordinates: 41°03′55″N 42°34′30″E
- Country: Turkey
- Province: Ardahan
- District: Ardahan
- Population (2021): 436
- Time zone: UTC+3 (TRT)

Tepeler is a village in the Ardahan District, Ardahan Province, Turkey. Its population is 436 (2021).

The historical name of Tepeler is Komki. Komki (კომკი or კომქი) was recorded as Komk (كومك) in the Ottoman land-survey register (mufassal defter) of 1595. The names of the household heads in this register indicate that it was a Georgian village. The name Komki was written as Konk (Конкъ) in the 1886 Russian census and as Konk (قونق) in the 1928 Ottoman village list.

The settlement areas of the extinct villages of Petre-Pavle (პეტრე-პავლე), Anuşivani (ანუშივანი), and Sadgomi (სადგომი) are located within the borders of Tepeler village.
