= İncedere, Posof =

İncedere
- Village
- Location within Turkey
- Coordinates: 41.5609°N 42.7770°E
- Country: Turkey
- Province: Ardahan
- District: Posof
- Population (2021): 75
- Time zone: UTC+3 (TRT)

İncedere is a village in the Posof District, Ardahan Province, Turkey. Its population is 75 (2021).
