= Baykent, Posof =

Baykent
- Village
- Location within Turkey
- Coordinates: 41°24′N 42°39′E
- Country: Turkey
- Province: Ardahan
- District: Posof
- Population (2021): 134
- Time zone: UTC+3 (TRT)

Baykent is a village in the Posof District, Ardahan Province, Turkey. Its population is 134 (2021).
