= Arılı, Posof =

Arılı
- Village
- Location within Turkey
- Coordinates: 41.4837°N 42.6782°E
- Country: Turkey
- Province: Ardahan
- District: Posof
- Population (2021): 52
- Time zone: UTC+3 (TRT)

Arılı is a village in the Posof District, Ardahan Province, Turkey. Its population is 52 (2021).

The old name of the village of Arılı is Zedatsminda. Zedatsminda (Georgian: ზედაწმინდა) is a Georgian place name and consists of the Georgian words ‘zeda’ (ზედა: upper) and ‘tsminda’ (წმინდა: saint). This place name was written as "Zedavan Zminda" (زدوان ذمندە) in the Ottoman land-survey register (mufassal defter) of 1595.
