= Armutveren, Posof =

Armutveren
- Village
- Location within Turkey
- Coordinates: 41.5760°N 42.7926°E
- Country: Turkey
- Province: Ardahan
- District: Posof
- Population (2021): 78
- Time zone: UTC+3 (TRT)

Armutveren is a village in the Posof District, Ardahan Province, Turkey. Its population is 78 (2021).

The former name of the village of Armutveren was Papala. Papala (Mingrelian: ფაფალა), a Mingrelian word, means canyon. This place name was recorded as Papala (پاپالا) in the Ottoman land-survey register (mufassal defter) of 1595.
