= Türkgözü =

- Village
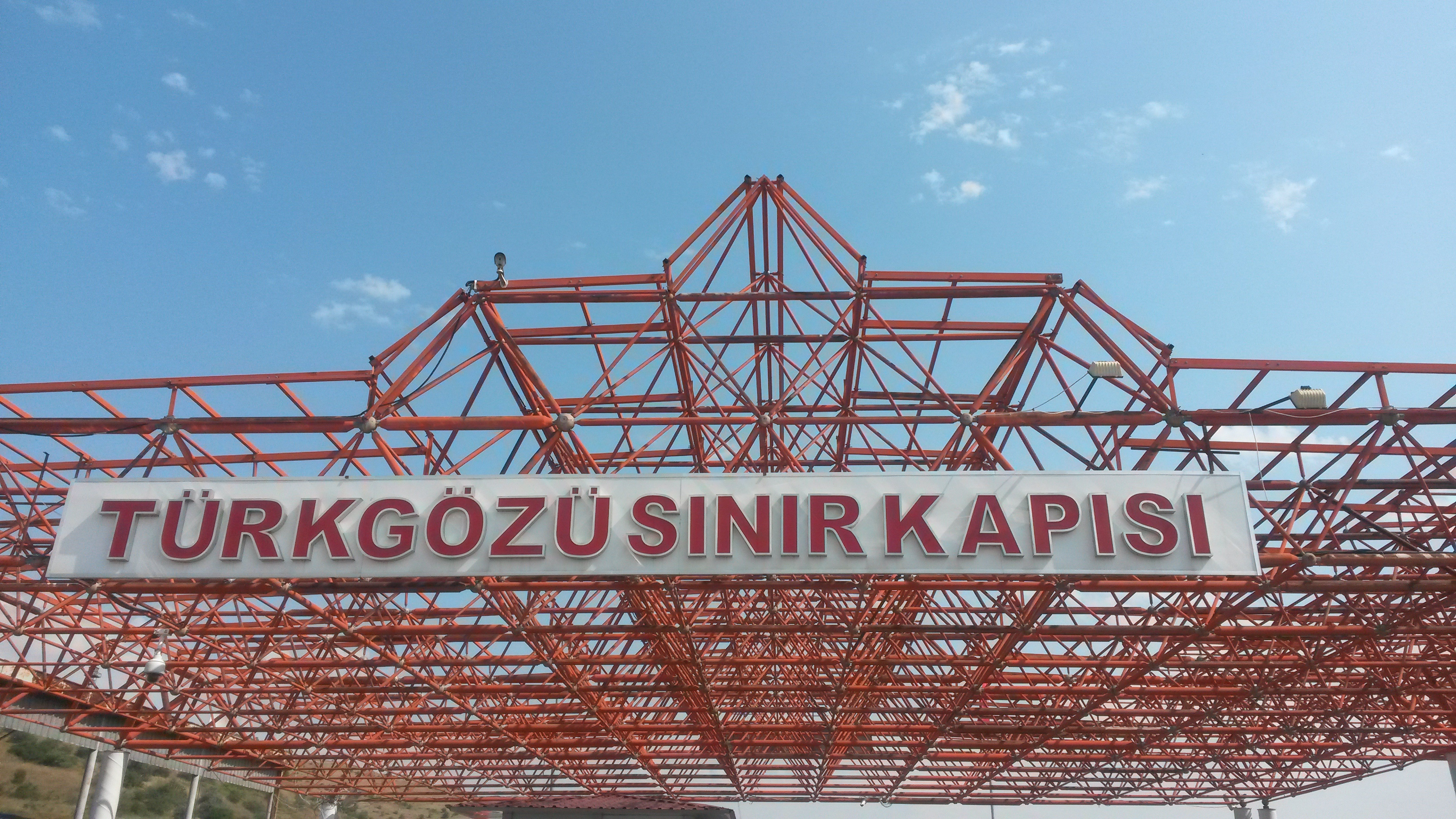
- The border crossing

- Location within Turkey
- Coordinates: 41°34′48″N 42°49′10.20″E
- Country: Turkey
- Province: Ardahan
- District: Posof
- Elevation: 1,260 m (4,130 ft)
- Time zone: UTC+3 (TRT)
- Postal code: 75800
- Area code: 0478

Türkgözü is a village in the Posof District, Ardahan Province, Turkey. Its population is 175 (2021). It is a border crossing point to Vale in Georgia. Türkgözü is 97 km (60 mi) north of the province center Ardahan and 16 km (9.9 mi) northeast of Posof.

The historical name of Türkgözü village is Badela. Badela (ბადელა) is a Georgian place name and is derived from the word "bade" (ბადე), meaning fishing net. The name of the village was also recorded as Badela (بادلە) in the Ottoman land-survey register (mufassal defter) of 1595.
