= Çakırkoç, Posof =

Çakırkoç
- Village
- Location within Turkey
- Coordinates: 41°30′N 42°43′E
- Country: Turkey
- Province: Ardahan
- District: Posof
- Population (2021): 23
- Time zone: UTC+3 (TRT)

Çakırkoç is a village in the Posof District, Ardahan Province, Turkey. Its population is 23 (2021).
