= Akballı, Posof =

Village in Ardahan Province, Turkey

Akballı
- Village
- Location within Turkey
- Coordinates: 41°26′N 42°38′E
- Country: Turkey
- Province: Ardahan
- District: Posof
- Population (2021): 48
- Time zone: UTC+3 (TRT)

Akballı, formerly Obol, is a village in the Posof District, Ardahan Province, Turkey. Its population is 48 (2021). The village is populated by Meskhetian Turks.
