= Sütoluk =

Village in Ardahan Province, Turkey

- Village
- Location within Turkey
- Coordinates: 41°27′N 42°56′E
- Country: Turkey
- Province: Ardahan
- District: Posof
- Population (2021): 89
- Time zone: UTC+3 (TRT)

Sütoluk is a village in the Posof District, Ardahan Province, Turkey. The village is populated by Kurds of the Gelturan tribe and had a population of 89 in 2021.
