= Çambeli, Posof =

Çambeli
- Village
- Location within Turkey
- Coordinates: 41°30′N 42°48′E
- Country: Turkey
- Province: Ardahan
- District: Posof
- Population (2021): 140
- Time zone: UTC+3 (TRT)

Çambeli is a village in the Posof District, Ardahan Province, Turkey. Its population is 140 (2021).
