= Batumi okrug =

Coordinates: 41°38′45″N 41°38′30″E

Batumi okrug Батумский округ
- Okrug
- Coat of arms

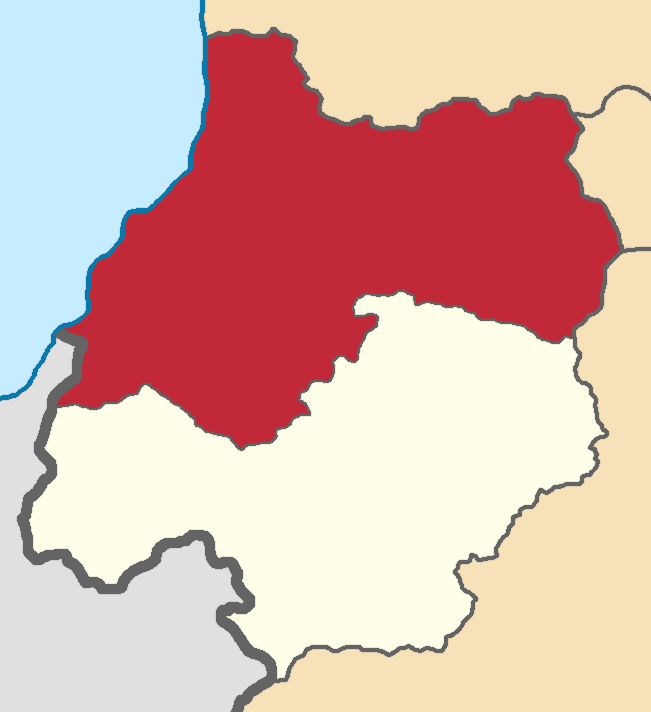
- Location in the Batum Oblast
- Country: Russian Empire
- Viceroyalty: Caucasus
- Oblast: Batum
- Established: 1878
- Treaty of Brest-Litovsk: 3 March 1918
- Capital: Batum (present-day Batumi)

Area
  - Total: 3,703.31 km^{2} (1,429.86 sq mi)

Population (1916)
  - Total: 85,397
  - Density: 23.060/km^{2} (59.724/sq mi)
  - Urban: 23.44%
  - Rural: 76.56%

The Batumi okrug (Note: Russian: Батумский округ, pre-reform orthography: Батумскій округъ, romanized: Batumskiy okrug [bətʊmskʲɪj ɐkrʊk]; Georgian: ბათუმის ოკრუგი, romanized: batumis ok'rugi [b̥atʰumis okʼɾuɡi]) was a district (okrug) of the Batum Oblast of the Russian Empire existing between 1878 and 1918. The district was eponymously named for its administrative center, the town of Batum (present-day Batumi), now part of Adjara within Georgia. The okrug bordered with the Artvin okrug in the south, the Ardahan okrug of the Kars Oblast to the southeast, the Tiflis Governorate to the northeast, the Kutaisi Governorate (of which it was a part in 1883–1903) to the north, and the Trebizond Vilayet of the Ottoman Empire to the west.

== Administrative divisions ==
The prefectures (участки, uchastki) of the Batumi okrug were:

Name	Administrative centre	1912 population	Area
Verkhne-Adzharskiy prefecture (Верхне-Аджарский участок)	Khulo	21,778	1,127.85 square versts (1,283.56 km^{2}; 495.59 mi^{2})
Goniyskiy prefecture (Гонийский участок)	Maradidi Verkhniye	10,310	688.24 square versts (783.26 km^{2}; 302.42 mi^{2})
Nizhne-Adzharskiy prefecture (Нижне-Аджарский участок)	Kedy (Keda)	17,974	783.83 square versts (892.05 km^{2}; 344.42 mi^{2})
Kintrishskiy prefecture (Кинтришский участок)	Komarovskoye	17,961	654.43 square versts (744.78 km^{2}; 287.56 mi^{2})

== Demographics ==
=== Russian Empire Census ===
According to the Russian Empire Census, the Batumi okrug had a population of 88,444 on 28 January [O.S. 15 January] 1897, including 53,149 men and 35,295 women. The majority of the population indicated Georgian to be their mother tongue, with significant Russian, Armenian and Greek speaking minorities.

Linguistic composition of the Batumi okrug in 1897
Language	Native speakers	%
Georgian	56,498	63.88
Russian	7,217	8.16
Armenian	7,120	8.05
Greek	4,650	5.26
Turkish	3,199	3.62
Kurdish	1,699	1.92
Ukrainian	1,637	1.85
Jewish	1,076	1.22
Polish	890	1.01
Persian	765	0.86
Abkhazian	687	0.78
Mingrelian	635	0.72
German	356	0.40
Tatar (Note: Before 1918, Azerbaijanis were generally known as "Tatars". This term, employed by the Russians, referred to Turkic-speaking Muslims of the South Caucasus. After 1918, with the establishment of the Azerbaijan Democratic Republic and "especially during the Soviet era", the Tatar group identified itself as "Azerbaijani".)	350	0.40
Imeretian	341	0.39
Lithuanian	157	0.18
Sartic	156	0.18
Belarusian	76	0.09
Avar-Andean	56	0.06
Kazi-Kumukh	47	0.05
English	38	0.04
Ossetian	28	0.03
Romanian	27	0.03
Svan	17	0.02
Estonian	11	0.01
Other	711	0.80
ТОТАL	88,444	100.00

=== Kavkazskiy kalendar ===
According to the 1917 publication of Kavkazskiy kalendar, the Batumi okrug had a population of 85,397 on 14 January [O.S. 1 January] 1916, including 47,532 men and 37,865 women, 61,347 of whom were the permanent population, and 24,050 were temporary residents:

Nationality	Urban		Rural		TOTAL	
Nationality	Number	%	Number	%	Number	%
Georgians	6,481	32.37	45,627	69.79	52,108	61.02
Sunni Muslims (Note: Primarily Turco-Tatars.)	75	0.37	14,163	21.66	14,238	16.67
Russians	4,825	24.10	3,394	5.19	8,219	9.62
Armenians	5,524	27.59	240	0.37	5,764	6.75
Asiatic Christians	1,097	5.48	1,078	1.65	2,175	2.55
Other Europeans	855	4.27	96	0.15	951	1.11
Jews	597	2.98	10	0.02	607	0.71
Kurds	8	0.04	544	0.83	552	0.65
Shia Muslims (Note: Primarily Tatars.)	386	1.93	25	0.04	411	0.48
North Caucasians	172	0.86	180	0.28	352	0.41
Roma	0	0.00	20	0.03	20	0.02
TOTAL	20,020	100.00	65,377	100.00	85,397	100.00

== Bibliography ==
- Bournoutian, George A. (2018). Armenia and Imperial Decline: The Yerevan Province, 1900–1914. Milton Park, Abingdon, Oxon: Routledge. ISBN 978-1-351-06260-2. OCLC 1037283914.
- Hovannisian, Richard G. (1971). The Republic of Armenia. Vol. 1: The First Year, 1918–1919. Berkeley: University of California Press. ISBN 978-0520019843.
- Кавказский календарь на 1913 год [Caucasian calendar for 1913] (in Russian) (68th ed.). Tiflis: Tipografiya kantselyarii Ye.I.V. na Kavkaze, kazenny dom. 1913. Archived from the original on 19 April 2022.
- Кавказский календарь на 1917 год [Caucasian calendar for 1917] (in Russian) (72nd ed.). Tiflis: Tipografiya kantselyarii Ye.I.V. na Kavkaze, kazenny dom. 1917. Archived from the original on 4 November 2021.
- Tsutsiev, Arthur (2014). Atlas of the Ethno-Political History of the Caucasus (PDF). Translated by Nora Seligman Favorov. New Haven: Yale University Press. ISBN 9780300153088. Archived (PDF) from the original on 17 June 2023.

== See also ==
- Kars Oblast
- Treaty of San Stefano
- Treaty of Berlin (1878)
