= Ali Monastery =

Monastery in Ardahan Province, Turkey

Coordinates: 41°29′32″N 42°46′14″E

- ალის წმინდა გიორგის მონასტერი
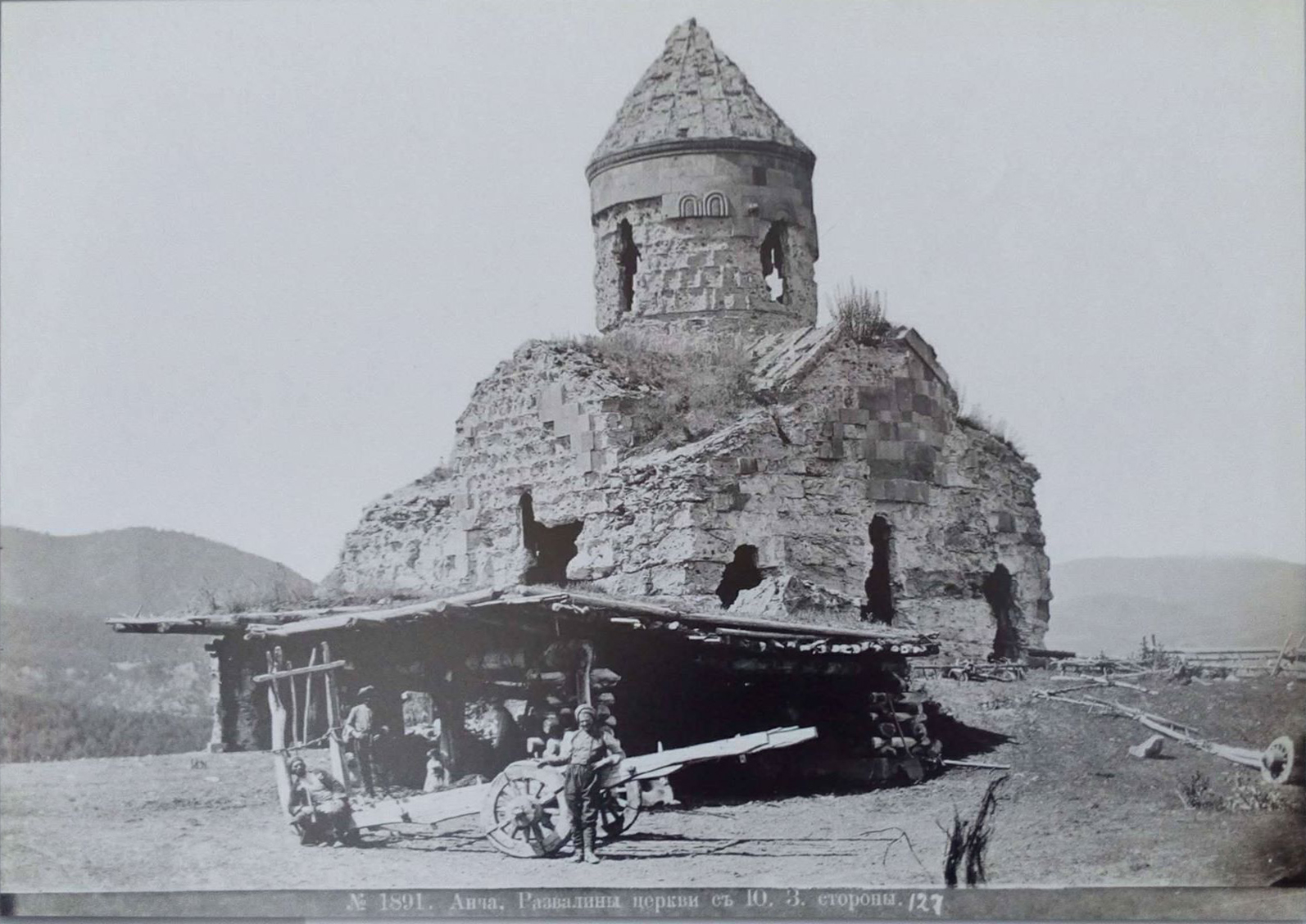
- Photograph taken by Dmitri Yermakov, before 1896
- Interactive map of Ali Monastery

Monastery information
- Denomination: Georgian Orthodox Church

Architecture
- Country: Turkey

Ali Monastery was a medieval Georgian Orthodox monastery named after Saint George in the village of Ali (Turkish: Alköy), Ardahan Province, Turkey.

The complex was an important ecclesiastical center in the region and is frequently noticed among primary sources. There are manuscripts depicting the rules of the monastic community. Architecturally, the most notable part of the complex is the main domed church whose only remaining part is its foundation. The monument was studied in the 19th and the beginning of the 20th centuries.

Founded either in the 10th or the 11th century AD, the monastery buildings were firmly preserved until the 1870s. Researchers visiting in the 1890s already remarked its poor condition. Locals had used the church stones for their houses and fences and as gravestones, also to build a mosque nearby. By 1920s the complex (incl. the domed church) had been perished.

== Source ==
- ტაო-კლარჯეთის ძეგლების 2014 წლის საკვლევი ექსპედიციების ანგარიშები. Caucasus University Publishing. 2015. p. 10-13. ISBN 978-9941-0-7362-5.
