= Günbatan, Posof =

Günbatan
- Village
- Location within Turkey
- Coordinates: 41°28′N 42°36′E
- Country: Turkey
- Province: Ardahan
- District: Posof
- Population (2021): 49
- Time zone: UTC+3 (TRT)

Günbatan is a village in the Posof District, Ardahan Province, Turkey. Its population is 49 (2021).
