= Taşkıran, Posof =

Taşkıran
- Village
- Location within Turkey
- Coordinates: 41.5599°N 42.7592°E
- Country: Turkey
- Province: Ardahan
- District: Posof
- Population (2021): 80
- Time zone: UTC+3 (TRT)

Taşkıran is a village in the Posof District, Ardahan Province, Turkey. Its population is 80 (2021).
