= Çamyazı, Posof =

Çamyazı
- Village
- Location within Turkey
- Coordinates: 41.4754°N 42.7289°E
- Country: Turkey
- Province: Ardahan
- District: Posof
- Population (2021): 69
- Time zone: UTC+3 (TRT)

Çamyazı is a village in the Posof District, Ardahan Province, Turkey. Its population is 69 (2021).
