= Özbaşı, Posof =

Özbaşı
- Village
- Location within Turkey
- Coordinates: 41.5009°N 42.6931°E
- Country: Turkey
- Province: Ardahan
- District: Posof
- Population (2021): 65
- Time zone: UTC+3 (TRT)

Özbaşı is a village in the Posof District, Ardahan Province, Turkey. Its population is 65 (2021).
