= Derindere, Posof =

Derindere
- Village
- Location within Turkey
- Coordinates: 41.4356°N 42.9328°E
- Country: Turkey
- Province: Ardahan
- District: Posof
- Population (2021): 176
- Time zone: UTC+3 (TRT)

Derindere is a village in the Posof District, Ardahan Province, Turkey. Its population is 176 (2021).
