= Gümüşkavak, Posof =

Gümüşkavak
- Village
- Location within Turkey
- Coordinates: 41.5291°N 42.7725°E
- Country: Turkey
- Province: Ardahan
- District: Posof
- Population (2021): 47
- Time zone: UTC+3 (TRT)

Gümüşkavak is a village in the Posof District, Ardahan Province, Turkey. Its population is 47 (2021).
