= Yeniköy, Posof =

Yeniköy
- Village
- Location within Turkey
- Coordinates: 41.4738°N 42.8184°E
- Country: Turkey
- Province: Ardahan
- District: Posof
- Population (2021): 199
- Time zone: UTC+3 (TRT)

Yeniköy is a village in the Posof District, Ardahan Province, Turkey. Its population is 199 (2021).
