= Kalkankaya, Posof =

Kalkankaya
- Village
- Location within Turkey
- Coordinates: 41.5697°N 42.7592°E
- Country: Turkey
- Province: Ardahan
- District: Posof
- Population (2021): 37
- Time zone: UTC+3 (TRT)

Kalkankaya is a village in the Posof District, Ardahan Province, Turkey. Its population is 37 (2021).
