= Aşıküzeyir, Posof =

Aşıküzeyir
- Village
- Location within Turkey
- Coordinates: 41°27′35″N 42°41′25″E
- Country: Turkey
- Province: Ardahan
- District: Posof
- Population (2021): 20
- Time zone: UTC+3 (TRT)

Aşıküzeyir is a village in the Posof District, Ardahan Province, Turkey. Its population is 20 (2021).
