= Demirdöver, Posof =

Demirdöver
- Village
- Location within Turkey
- Coordinates: 41.4959°N 42.6794°E
- Country: Turkey
- Province: Ardahan
- District: Posof
- Population (2021): 82
- Time zone: UTC+3 (TRT)

Demirdöver is a village in the Posof District, Ardahan Province, Turkey. Its population is 82 (2021).
