= Yolağzı, Posof =

Yolağzı
- Village
- Location within Turkey
- Coordinates: 41°30′10″N 42°37′27″E
- Country: Turkey
- Province: Ardahan
- District: Posof
- Population (2021): 76
- Time zone: UTC+3 (TRT)

Yolağzı is a village in the Posof District, Ardahan Province, Turkey. Its population is 76 (2021).
