= Gürarmut, Posof =

Gürarmut
- Village
- Location within Turkey
- Coordinates: 41°31′N 42°40′E
- Country: Turkey
- Province: Ardahan
- District: Posof
- Population (2021): 88
- Time zone: UTC+3 (TRT)

Gürarmut is a village in the Posof District, Ardahan Province, Turkey. Its population is 88 (2021).
