= Sajike =

Sajike (Georgian: საჯიქე) is a vanished village in the Turkish part of the historical region of Samtskhe in Georgia. Its location was near the village of Söğütlükaya (Hunamisi) in the Posof district of Ardahan Province in Turkey.

== History ==
The Georgian place name Sajike (საჯიქე) derives from the word "jiki" (ჯიქი) and meaning "land of the leopard".

A small portion of the historical region of Samtskhe, where the village of Sajike is located, remains within the borders of Turkey. The Ottoman Empire captured Samtskhe, one of the regions that formed Georgia, in 1578.

The village of Sajike was also recorded as Sajike (ساجیكە) in the Ottoman land-survey register (mufassal defter) of 1595. At that time, this settlement was within the Güney district (nahiye) of Poshov liva, within the Vilayet-i Gürcistan of Ottoman province. The village was recorded as vacant, but a tax of 2,000 akçe was stipulated.

The village of Sajike had the same administrative status as Sajike (ساجیكە) in the Ottoman cebe defter of Çıldır Province (Eyalet-i Çıldır), covering the period 1694-1732. In 1134 AH (1721/1722), the village was assigned to someone named Hasan, and a tax of 2,000 akçe was stipulated.

Georgian Turkologist Sergi Jikia, who published the Ottoman detailed register, noted that the village of Sajike is referred to as Sajike (Саджике) in Russian sources. However, the fact that Sajike was not listed as a village in the Poshov district of the Ardahan district in the Russian census of 1886 shows that it had ceased to be a village before this date.
