= Söğütlükaya, Posof =

Söğütlükaya
- Village
- Location within Turkey
- Coordinates: 41°28′30″N 42°41′20″E
- Country: Turkey
- Province: Ardahan
- District: Posof
- Population (2021): 124
- Time zone: UTC+3 (TRT)

Söğütlükaya is a village in the Posof District, Ardahan Province, Turkey. Its population is 124 (2021).

The Georgian village of Sajike was within the present-day borders of Söğütlükaya village.
