= Alabalık, Posof =

Alabalık
- Village
- Location within Turkey
- Coordinates: 41.4216°N 42.6179°E
- Country: Turkey
- Province: Ardahan
- District: Posof
- Population (2021): 109
- Time zone: UTC+3 (TRT)

Alabalık is a village in the Posof District, Ardahan Province, Turkey. Its population is 109 (2021).

The former name of Alabalık village was Saikhve. Saikhve (Georgian: საიხვე), a Georgian place name, is derived from the word "ikhv"’ (იხვი: duck) and means "duck farm" or "place where ducks are raised". It was recorded as "Saivkhe" (سایوخۀ) in the Ottoman land-survey register (mufassal defter) of 1595 as a result of metathesis.
