= Kumlukoz, Posof =

Kumlukoz
- Village
- Location within Turkey
- Coordinates: 41°34′N 42°47′E
- Country: Turkey
- Province: Ardahan
- District: Posof
- Population (2021): 97
- Time zone: UTC+3 (TRT)

Kumlukoz is a village in the Posof District, Ardahan Province, Turkey. Its population is 97 (2021).
