= Balgöze, Posof =

Village in Ardahan Province, Turkey

Balgöze
- Village
- Location within Turkey
- Coordinates: 41.4481°N 42.9074°E
- Country: Turkey
- Province: Ardahan
- District: Posof
- Population (2021): 216
- Time zone: UTC+3 (TRT)

Balgöze is a village in the Posof District, Ardahan Province, Turkey. The village is populated by Kurds of the Gelturan tribe and had a population of 216 in 2021.

The former name of Balgözü village was Childireti. It derives from the Georgian word Chrdileti (ჩრდილეთი), meaning "northern land". Indeed, there is a village called Çrdileti (ჩრდილეთი) in present-day Georgia. This place name appears as Çildiret (چیلدیرەت) in Turkish sources.
