= Asmakonak, Posof =

Asmakonak
- Village
- Location within Turkey
- Coordinates: 41°29′N 42°43′E
- Country: Turkey
- Province: Ardahan
- District: Posof
- Population (2021): 41
- Time zone: UTC+3 (TRT)

Asmakonak is a village in the Posof District, Ardahan Province, Turkey. Its population is 41 (2021).

The former name of Asmakonak village is Samkhula. Samkhula (Georgian: სამხულა), a Georgian place name, consists of the words sami (სამი: three) and khula (ხულა: barn) and means "Three Barns". This place name is also written as "Samkhula" (سامخولا) in the Ottoman land-survey register (mufassal defter) of 1595.
