= Turkish Straits crisis =

Cold War territorial conflict

- Part of the Cold War (from 1947)
- The location of the Bosphorus (red) and Dardanelles (yellow) straits.
Date	Low level: 20 July 1936 – 6 August 1946 (10 years, 2 weeks and 3 days); High level: 7 August 1946 – 30 May 1953 (6 years, 9 months, 3 weeks and 2 days)
Location	Black Sea; Sea of Marmara
Result	Status quo ante bellum: The Soviet Union withdraws demands for a regime change on the Turkish straits; Turkey joins NATO

Belligerents
Turkey; Supported by: United States	Soviet Union

Commanders and leaders
(Turkey) İsmet İnönü; (Turkey) Adnan Menderes; (United States) Harry S. Truman; (United States) Dwight Eisenhower	(Soviet Union) Joseph Stalin; (Soviet Union) Vyacheslav Molotov

Strength
(Turkey) Unknown number of Turkish Navy ships; (United States) Unknown number of US Naval advisors	(Soviet Union) Several warships; Unknown number of ground forces

The Turkish Straits crisis was a Cold War–era territorial conflict between the Soviet Union and Turkey. Turkey had remained officially neutral throughout most of the Second World War. (Note: In February 1945, weeks before the Nazis surrendered, Turkey declared war on Germany. Turkey never made any effort to participate in hostilities and entered the war only on paper to gain favor with the Allies and profit from seizing German assets.) After the war ended, Turkey was pressured by the Soviet government to institute joint military control of passage through the Turkish Straits, which connected the Black Sea to the Mediterranean. When the Turkish government refused, tensions in the region rose, leading to a Soviet show of force and demands for territorial concessions along the Georgia–Turkey border.

This intimidation campaign was intended to preempt American influence or naval presence in the Black Sea, as well as to weaken Turkey's government and pull it into the Soviet sphere of influence. The Straits crisis was a catalyst, along with the Greek Civil War, for the creation of the Truman Doctrine. At its climax, the dispute would motivate Turkey to turn to the United States for protection through NATO membership.

== Background ==
=== Importance of the straits ===
The two sequential gateways between the Black Sea and Mediterranean, the Dardanelles and Bosporus, were important as a trade route from the Black Sea into ports all over the world for Turkey and its other Black Sea neighbors: the USSR, the Romanian People's Republic, and the People's Republic of Bulgaria, which were militarily aligned with one another. The straits also served as an important component of military strategy; whoever wielded control of traffic through the straits could use them as an exit or entry point for naval forces to navigate the Black Sea while preventing rival powers from doing so.

Before the crisis, Russia—and then the Soviet Union—had historically desired control of the Turkish straits, as part of its striving for ice-free ports. The value of the Russian Black Sea ports was directly related to their access to the ocean, which entirely depended on passage through the Turkish Straits, the only waterway connecting the two. This was one of the main reasons for most of the Russo-Turkish wars.

=== Diplomatic history ===
Until the latter half of the 1930s, Soviet–Turkish relations were cordial and somewhat fraternal. At the request of Mustafa Kemal Atatürk, Vladimir Lenin provided crucial military and financial aid to the Turkish National Movement in its struggle against the Ottoman monarchy and Western occupiers; two million gold Imperial rubles, 60,000 rifles, and 100 artillery pieces were sent in the summer of 1920. Before they had even established official governments, the countries' revolutionary movements – the Turkish Government of the Grand National Assembly and the Bolsheviks of the Russian SFSR – recognized each other and pledged cooperation in the 1921 Treaty of Moscow. The parties agreed to defer the final settlement on the status of the Black Sea and the Turkish Straits to a future conference. The Straits resolution at Lausanne, signed on 24 July 1923 by the United Kingdom, France, Italy, and Turkey, called for demilitarizing the Straits Zone and forming an international commission to control them. The Soviets were never satisfied with this. In 1925, Turkey and the Soviet Union committed to abstain from participating in alliances or coalitions directed against each other. This "treaty of friendship and neutrality" was extended in 1935 for a ten-year term, with optional renewal intervals of two years scheduled after 1945.

In 1934, Soviet diplomats secretly urged their counterparts to assent to bases on the Straits, a demand which British Ambassador Percy Loraine credited with helping strengthen Turkey-United Kingdom relations in the interwar period. The Montreux Convention Regarding the Regime of the Straits was convened in 1936, with the governments of Australia, Bulgaria, France, Germany, Greece, Japan, Romania, the Soviet Union, Turkey, the United Kingdom and Yugoslavia represented, to determine both military and regulatory policy for the Turkish straits. The issue regained relevance due to the expansionist ambitions of Fascist Italy and Nazi Germany, as well as a fear that Bulgaria would take it upon itself to remilitarize the straits. Under the terms of the treaty, signed on 20 July 1936, Turkey was given sole responsibility for regulating passages through the straits. The Montreux Convention instituted rules for both merchant and military vessels which are stricter than international law typically allows, such as mandatory sanitation inspections and Turkish discretion to impose general fees on non-stopover voyages. The treaty required all states to give prior notice to Turkish authorities before their warships transited the straits, while imposing limits on the size, quantity and type of warships eligible for entry to the Black Sea. Such blanket provisions contravene prevailing norms of innocent passage and transit passage.

Joseph Stalin repeatedly challenged the agreements reached by the 1936 convention, asking as early as 1939 for an alternative arrangement. He proposed joint Turkish and Soviet control of the straits. Upon signing the Molotov–Ribbentrop Pact with Nazi Germany, Soviet Foreign Minister Vyacheslav Molotov informed his German colleagues of his desire to forcefully take control of the straits and establish a military base in their proximity.

Shortly after the invasion of Poland began in September 1939, Turkish Foreign Minister Şükrü Saracoğlu traveled to Moscow, where he was snubbed by Stalin and pressured by Kremlin authorities to allow a Soviet military installation on the shore of the straits.

=== Border conflicts with Turkey ===
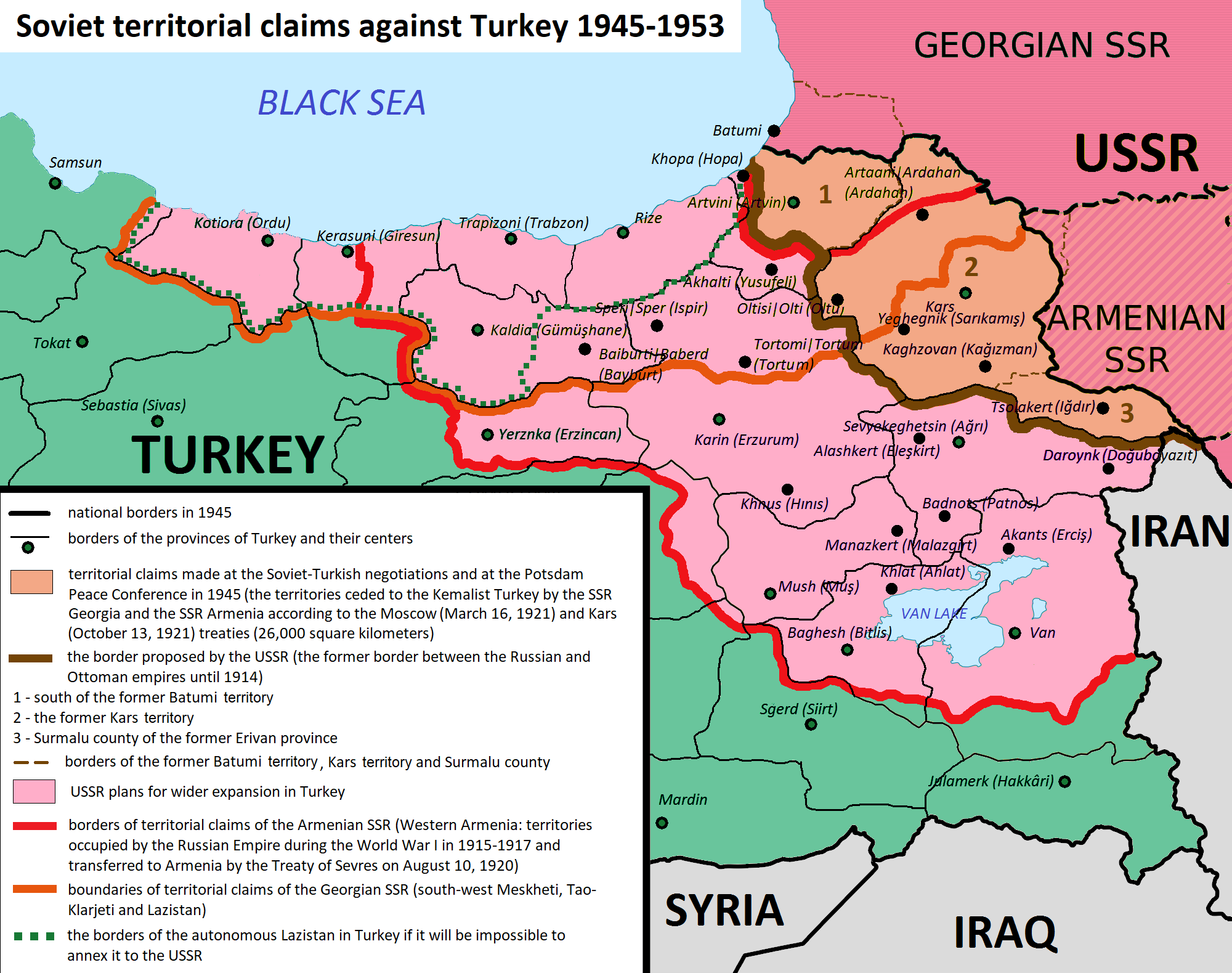
Soviet territorial claims against Turkey

The Soviet Union demanded territorial adjustments involving the Georgian SSR and Armenian SSR in the Eastern Anatolia region of Turkey. Soviet Deputy Premier Lavrentiy Beria claimed that Turkish territories held by Georgia had been seized from the Georgians by the Turks during the Ottoman era, a claim that reached Stalin. If Beria's proposed map was accepted by Turkey, Soviet influence in the Black Sea and the Middle East would have expanded, while the British Empire's standing in the region would have diminished.This claim was withdrawn in May 1953, alongside Soviet demands regarding the Straits.

== The crisis ==
=== Escalation ===
Tensions between the USSR and Turkey grew over Turkey not allowing the Soviet Fleet, with civilian crews to traverse the straits during WWII. After the Allied defeat of Nazi Germany, the Soviets returned to the issue in 1945 and 1946. Throughout 1946, American and Turkish diplomats frequently conversed on the issue. The 6 April 1946 visit of the American battleship USS Missouri further angered the Soviets. The ship had come to the region under the explanation that it was delivering the mortuary urn of the late Turkish Ambassador home, a claim which was dismissed by the Soviets as coincidental.

=== Soviet message to Turkey ===
On 7 August 1946, the Soviets presented a note to the Turkish Foreign Ministry which stated that the way Turkey was handling the straits no longer represented the security interests of Turkey's fellow Black Sea nations. This drew attention to the occasions in which Italian and German warships had passed through the straits without conflict. (The German ships were only detained by Turkish forces once the country declared war on Germany on 23 February 1945.) The note concluded that the regime of the straits was no longer reliable and demanded that the Montreux Treaty be re-examined and rewritten in a new international conference.

=== The US stance ===
When the issue was brought up at the Potsdam Conference, the President of the United States, Harry S. Truman, said the question of the straits was a domestic political issue pertaining to Turkey and the USSR, and should be solved by the two involved parties. As the argument heated up in the days preceding Potsdam, the United States decided it firmly did not want the straits to fall into Soviet hands, as it would give them a major strategic gateway between the Black Sea and Mediterranean and possibly lead to a Communist Turkey. In a secret telegram sent by US Under Secretary of State Dean Acheson to diplomats in Paris, he explained the American position on the matter.

In our opinion the primary objective of the Soviet Union is to obtain control over Turkey. We believe that if the Soviet Union succeeds in introducing into Turkey armed forces with the ostensible purpose of enforcing the joint control of the Straits, the Soviet Union will use these forces to obtain control over Turkey…. In our opinion, therefore, the time has come when we must decide that we shall resist with all means at our disposal any Soviet aggression and in particular, because the case of Turkey would be so clear, any Soviet aggression against Turkey. In carrying this policy our words and acts will only carry conviction to the Soviet Union if they are formulated against the background of an inner conviction and determination on our part that we cannot permit Turkey to become the object of Soviet aggression.

— Dean Acheson, Telegram to the Secretary of State at Paris – August 8, 1946

On 20 August 1946, Undersecretary Acheson met with fifteen journalists to explain the urgency of the situation and make the opinions of the United States Government known.

=== Western support of Turkey and de-escalation ===
In the summer and autumn of 1946, the Soviet Union increased its naval presence in the Black Sea, having Soviet vessels perform maneuvers near Turkish shores. A substantial number of ground troops were dispatched to the Balkans. Buckling under the mounting pressure from the Soviets, in a matter of days Turkey appealed to the United States for aid. After consulting his administration, President Truman sent a naval task force to Turkey. On 9 October 1946, the respective governments of the United States and United Kingdom reaffirmed their support for Turkey. On 26 October, the Soviet Union withdrew its specific request for a new summit on the control of the Turkish Straits (but not its opinions) and sometime shortly thereafter pulled out most of the intimidatory military forces from the region. Turkey abandoned its policy of neutrality and accepted US$100 million in economic and defence aid from the US in 1947 under the Truman Doctrine's plan of ceasing the spread of Soviet influence into Turkey and Greece. The two aforementioned nations joined NATO in 1952.

=== Continued debate (1947–1953) ===
The Turkish government appointed a new ambassador to Moscow, Faik Akdur, in November 1946. Turkish President İnönü instructed Akdur to focus solely on further development of relations with the Soviet Union. Akdur was also specifically forbidden to engage in talks regarding the straits if they did occur.

The United States proposed that an international conference be held to decide the fate of the Dardanelles and Bosphorus once and for all. Then-Soviet Ambassador to Turkey, Sergei Vinogradov, responded in the form of a memorandum sent to the Soviet capital on 10 December 1946, asserting that a conference held in such a climate as described by the United States was unacceptable, in that the Soviet Union was certain to be outvoted. He predicted that, instead of a regime change, which was the steadfast and undying goal of the Soviet Foreign Ministry, the current infrastructure with which the straits were regulated would survive, albeit with some changes.

The Soviet ambassador to Turkey during the first year and a half of the crisis, Sergei Vinogradov, was replaced by the Soviet Politburo in 1948. His successor, Aleksandr Lavrishev, came with a set of instructions from the Soviet Foreign Ministry which would prove to be the last momentous Soviet document on the straits.

If the Turks want to know our stand on the straits, an answer would be as follows: the Soviet position has been thoroughly stated in the notes dated August 7 and September 24, 1946.

— Soviet Foreign Ministry, Point No. 4 of the "Instructions for the Ambassador to Turkey" – March 29, 1948

== Border dispute ==
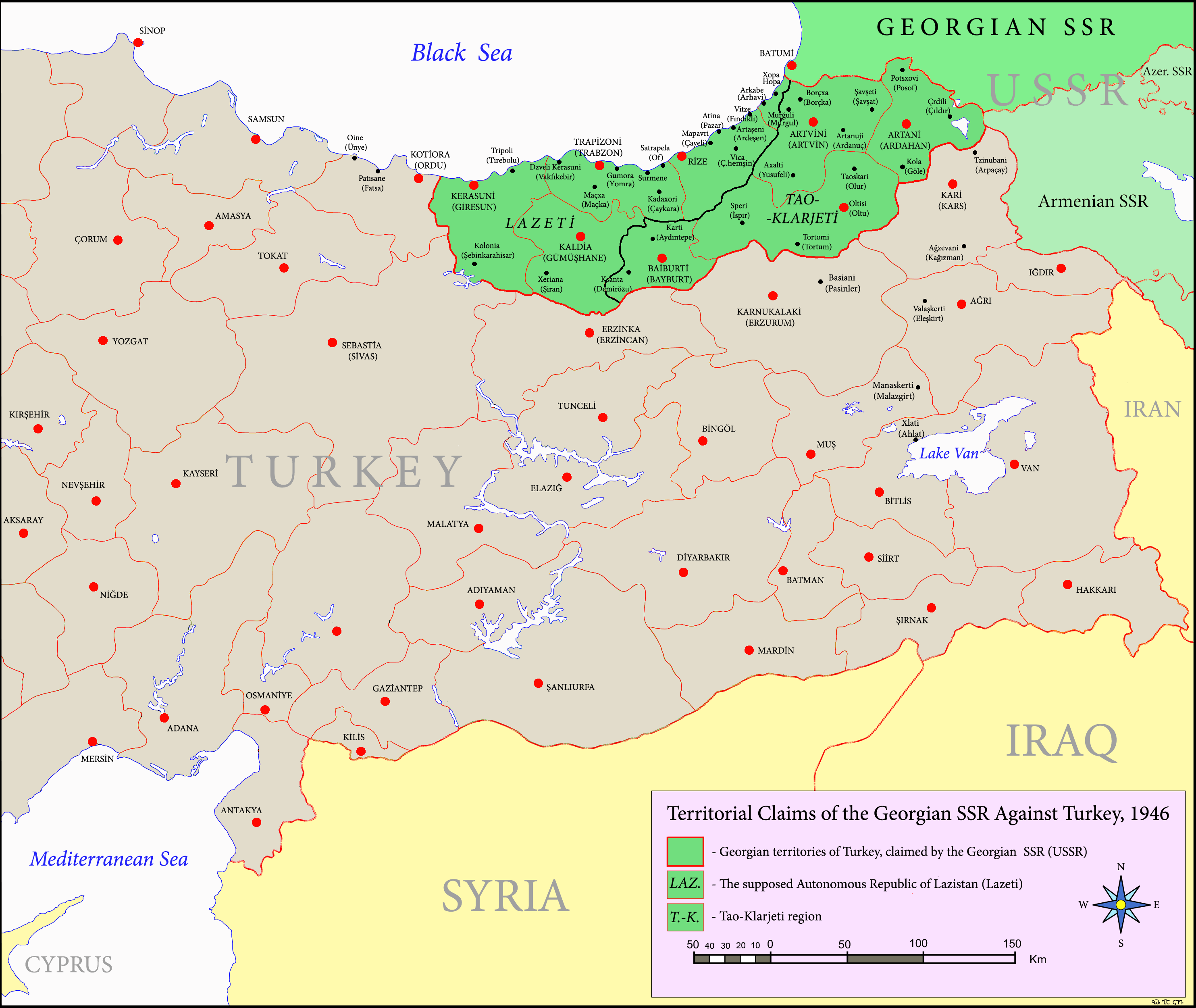
Map showing Turkish territory claimed by the Georgian Soviet Socialist Republic in 1946.

The Soviet Union wished for its border with Turkey to be re-negotiated so as to benefit the Armenian and Georgian SSRs. Deputy premier Lavrentiy Beria asserted to Stalin that a strip of Turkish-controlled territory stretching southwest from Georgia to Giresun (including Lazistan) had been stolen from the Georgians by the Turks under the Ottoman Empire. In 1945, the Soviets declined to extend the 1925 non-aggression treaty, as Molotov conditioned its renewal on negotiations over Turkish-controlled territory.

== Aftermath ==
After the death of Joseph Stalin, commitment to seek a change in the arrangements governing the straits declined within the Soviet government. On 30 May 1953, Soviet Foreign Minister Molotov discontinued the Russian claims over the Bosphorus and Dardanelles, as well as the other territorial disputes along the Turkish–Armenian–Georgian border.

When Turkey joined Western-aligned NATO in 1952, Soviet hopes for a substantive thaw in relations were dashed. The Montreux Treaty of 1936, with revisions, is still in place in the present day between the successor states of the USSR and Turkey.

== See also ==
- Domino theory
- Iron Curtain
- Turkey–United Kingdom relations
- Turkey–United States relations
