= Kolköy, Posof =

Kolköy
- Village
- Location within Turkey
- Coordinates: 41.4449°N 42.6109°E
- Country: Turkey
- Province: Ardahan
- District: Posof
- Population (2021): 186
- Time zone: UTC+3 (TRT)

Kolköy is a village in the Posof District, Ardahan Province, Turkey. Its population is 186 (2021).

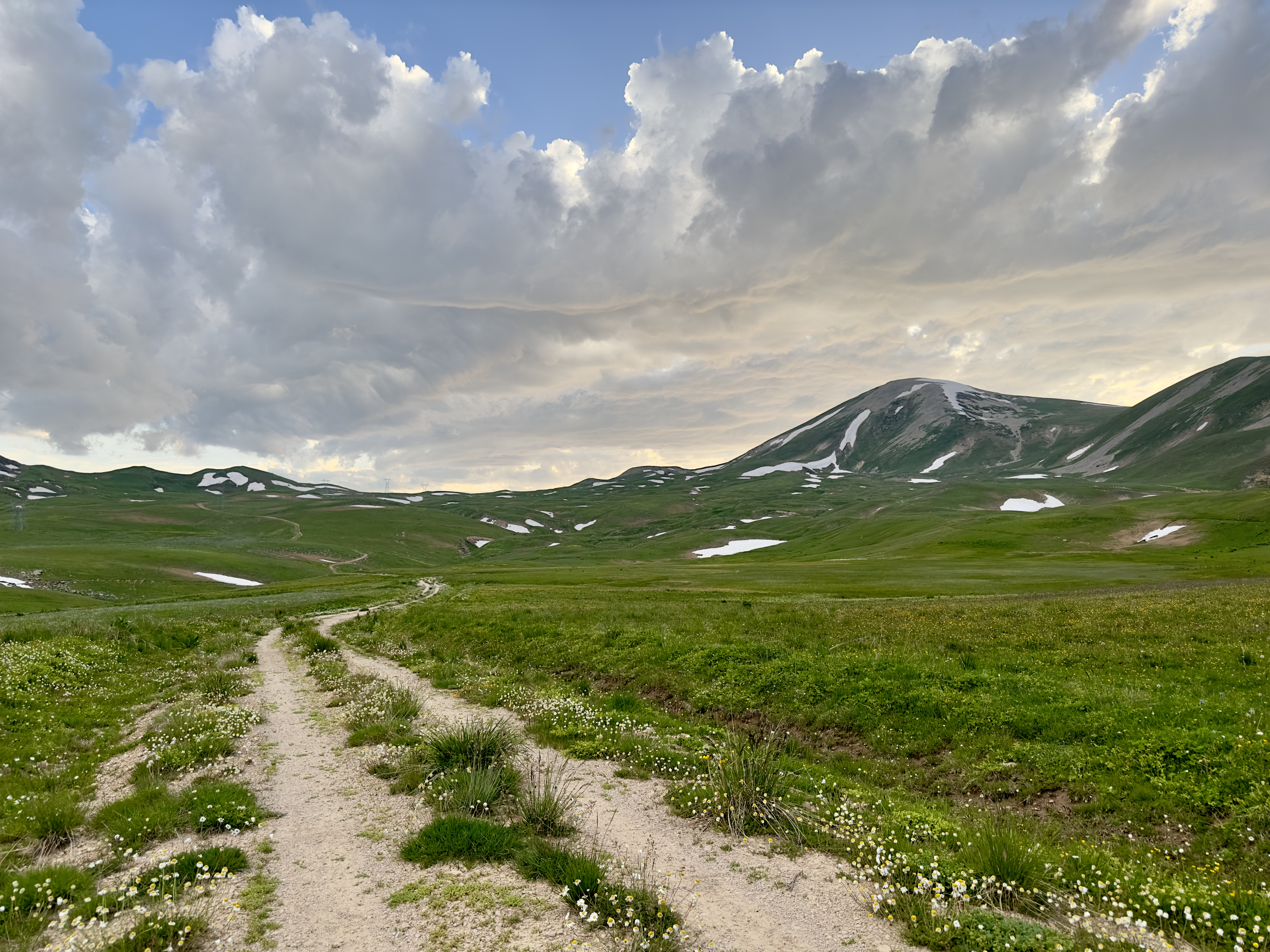
pasture near Kolköy
