= Kırköy, Posof =

Kırköy
- Village
- Location within Turkey
- Country: Turkey
- Province: Ardahan
- District: Posof
- Population (2021): 40
- Time zone: UTC+3 (TRT)

Kırköy is a village in the Posof District, Ardahan Province, Turkey. As of 2021, its population is 40.
