= Günlüce, Posof =

Günlüce
- Village
- Location within Turkey
- Country: Turkey
- Province: Ardahan
- District: Posof
- Population (2021): 81
- Time zone: UTC+3 (TRT)

Günlüce is a village in the Posof District, Ardahan Province, Turkey. Its population is 81 (2021).
