= Sarıdarı, Posof =

Sarıdarı
- Village
- Location within Turkey
- Coordinates: 41°34′N 42°49′E
- Country: Turkey
- Province: Ardahan
- District: Posof
- Population (2021): 37
- Time zone: UTC+3 (TRT)

Sarıdarı is a village in the Posof District, Ardahan Province, Turkey. Its population is 37 (2021).
