= Kurşunçavuş, Posof =

Kurşunçavuş
- Village
- Location within Turkey
- Coordinates: 41°32′N 42°37′E
- Country: Turkey
- Province: Ardahan
- District: Posof
- Population (2021): 45
- Time zone: UTC+3 (TRT)

Kurşunçavuş is a village in the Posof District, Ardahan Province, Turkey. Its population is 45 (2021).
