= Alköy, Posof =

Village in Ardahan Province, Turkey

Alköy
- Village
- Location within Turkey
- Coordinates: 41°29′N 42°46′E
- Country: Turkey
- Province: Ardahan
- District: Posof
- Population (2021): 157
- Time zone: UTC+3 (TRT)

Alköy is a village in the Posof District, Ardahan Province, Turkey. Its population is 157 (2021).

The village has a Lom population.

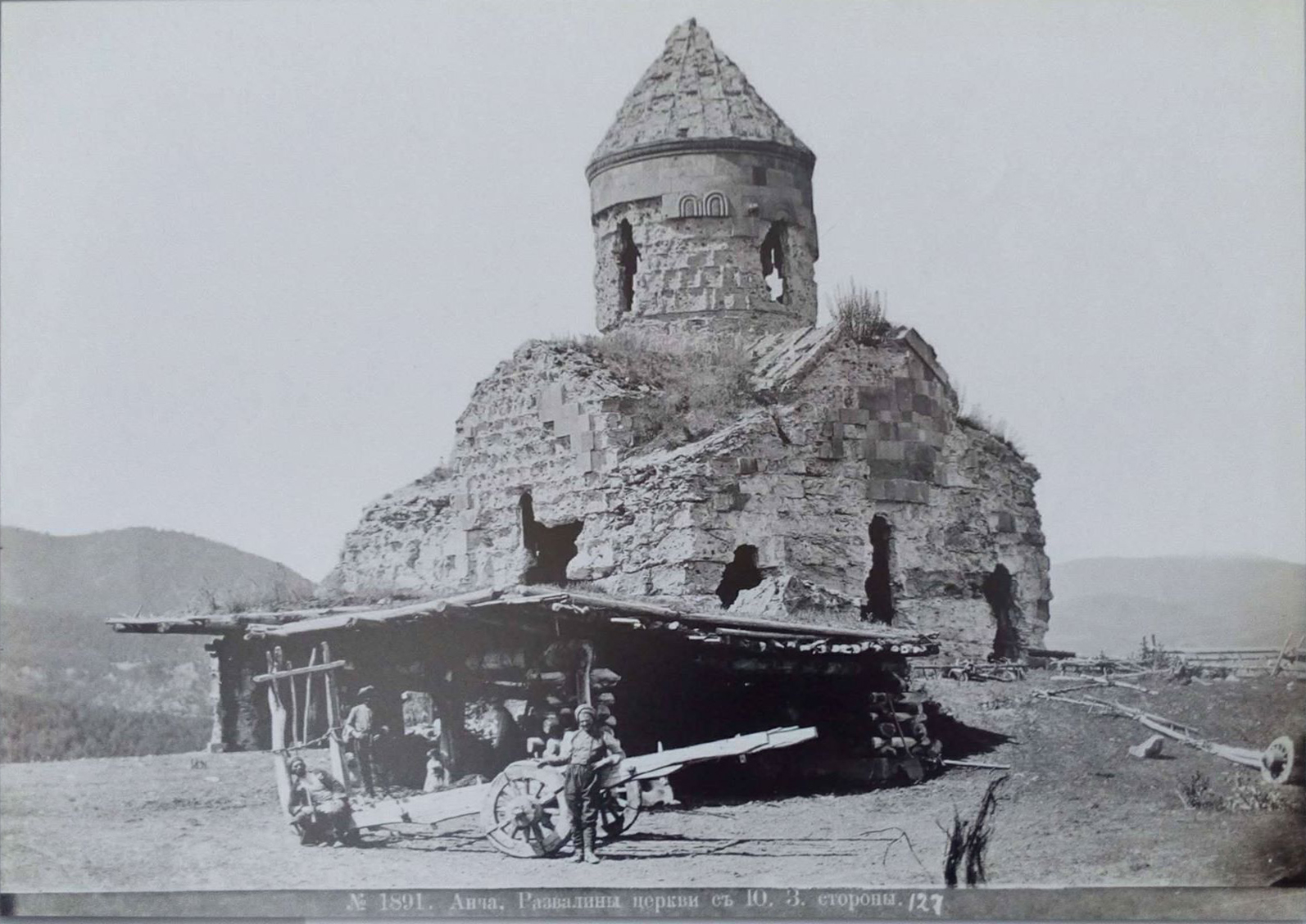
Georgian monastery formerly existing in Alköy

Alköy's former name was Ali (Georgian: ალი). There is a settlement in Georgia bearing the name Ali. This name is written as Al (ال) in the Ottoman land-survey register (mufassal defter) of 1595. The main church of the Georgian monastery, Ali Monastery, Ali Church, was built in the 10th the 11th century.
