= Yaylaaltı, Posof =

Yaylaaltı
- Village
- Location within Turkey
- Coordinates: 41°35′N 42°43′E
- Country: Turkey
- Province: Ardahan
- District: Posof
- Population (2021): 19
- Time zone: UTC+3 (TRT)

Yaylaaltı is a village in the Posof District, Ardahan Province, Turkey. Its population is 19 (2021).
