= Yurtbaşı, Posof =

Yurtbaşı
- Village
- Location within Turkey
- Coordinates: 41.4975°N 42.6308°E
- Country: Turkey
- Province: Ardahan
- District: Posof
- Population (2021): 31
- Time zone: UTC+3 (TRT)

Yurtbaşı is a village in the Posof District, Ardahan Province, Turkey. Its population is 31 (2021).
