= Uğurca, Posof =

Uğurca
- Village
- Location within Turkey
- Coordinates: 41.5170°N 42.6928°E
- Country: Turkey
- Province: Ardahan
- District: Posof
- Population (2021): 38
- Time zone: UTC+3 (TRT)

Uğurca is a village in the Posof District, Ardahan Province, Turkey. Its population is 38 (2021).
