= Binbaşıeminbey, Posof =

Binbaşıeminbey
- Village
- Location within Turkey
- Coordinates: 41°33′N 42°47′E
- Country: Turkey
- Province: Ardahan
- District: Posof
- Population (2021): 94
- Time zone: UTC+3 (TRT)

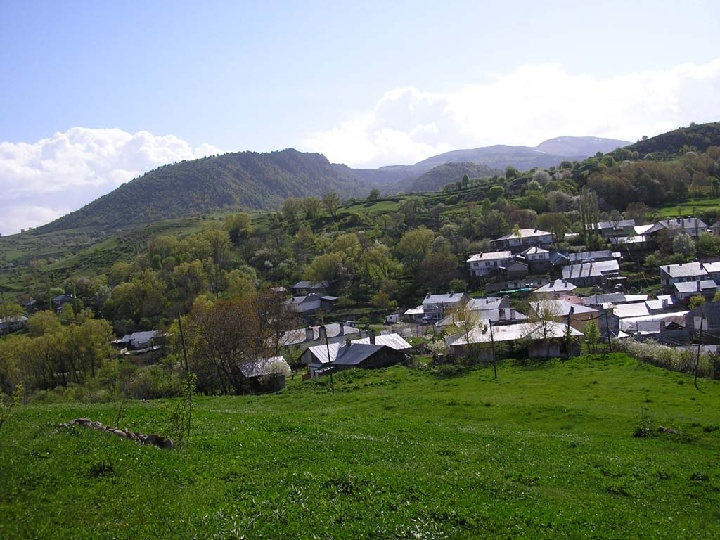

Binbaşıeminbey (or Binbaşı Eminbey) is a village in the Posof District, Ardahan Province, Turkey. Its population is 94 (2021).

The old name of the village of Binbaşıeminbey is Chilvana. Chilvana (ჭილვანა) is derived from the Georgian word "chili" (ჭილი: rush) and means "rush bed". Chili (ჭილი) is known in this region as ‘cil otu’ and is used in the manufacture of saddles. Chilvana is written as "Çilvana" (چلوانە) in the Ottoman land-survey register (mufassal defter) of 1595. The name of the village later changed to "Cilvana" (جیلوانا) in Turkish. Poma, formerly a village, is now within the boundaries of Binbaşıeminbey village.
