= Posof =

Town in Ardahan Province, Turkey

- Municipality
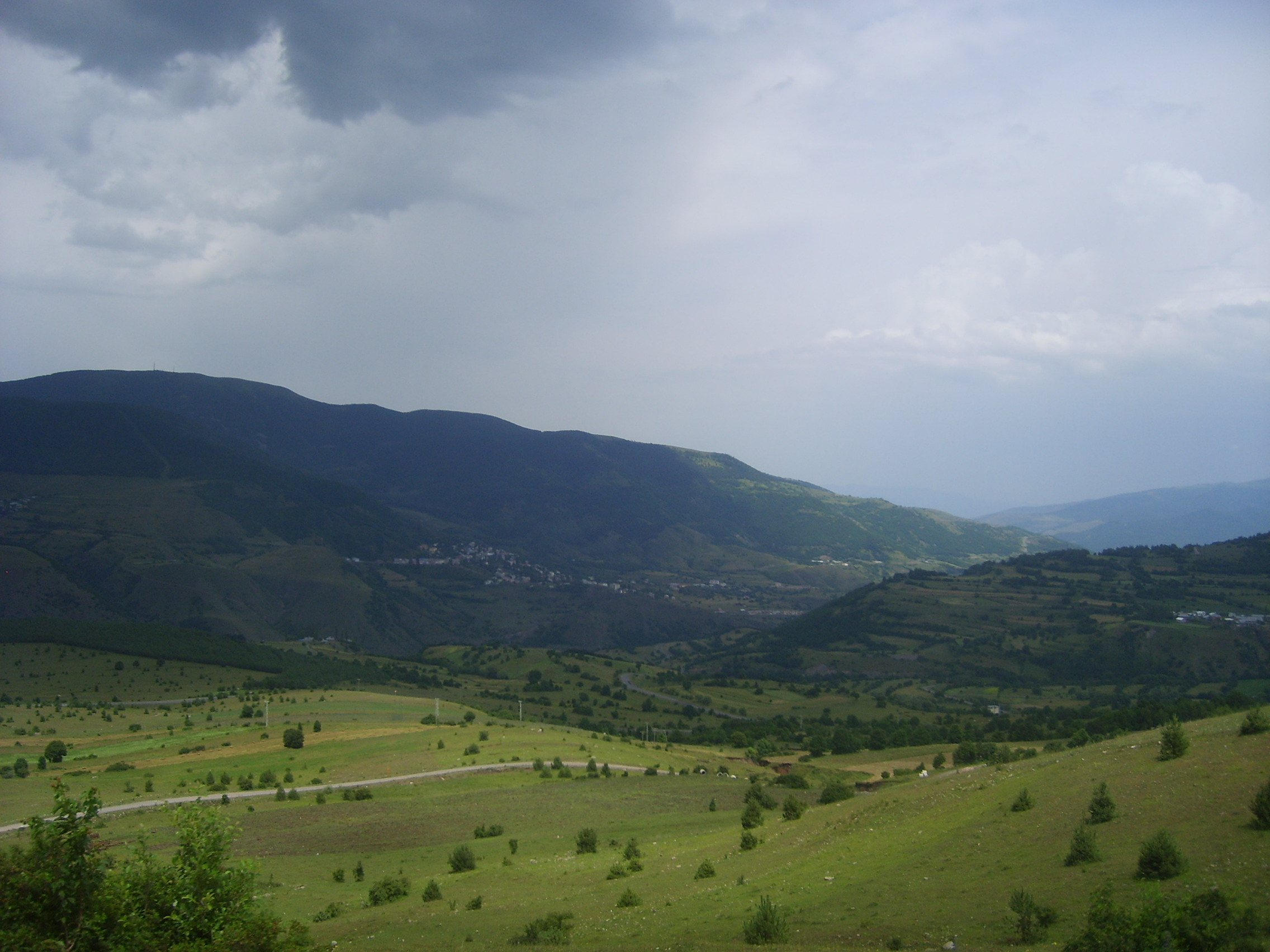
- View of Posof city

- Location within Turkey
- Coordinates: 41°30′42″N 42°43′45″E
- Country: Turkey
- Province: Ardahan
- District: Posof

Government
  - Mayor: Erdem Demirci (CHP)
- Population (2021): 2,106
- Time zone: UTC+3 (TRT)
- Postal code: 75800
- Website: www.posof.bel.tr

Posof (Georgian: ფოცხოვი, Potskhovi, formerly Georgian: დიღვირი, Dighviri) is a town in Ardahan Province of Turkey, in the far east of the country, 75 km from the city of Ardahan and near the border with Georgia. It is located in the historical region of Samtskhe. It is the administrative centre of the Posof District. Its population is 2,106 (2021).

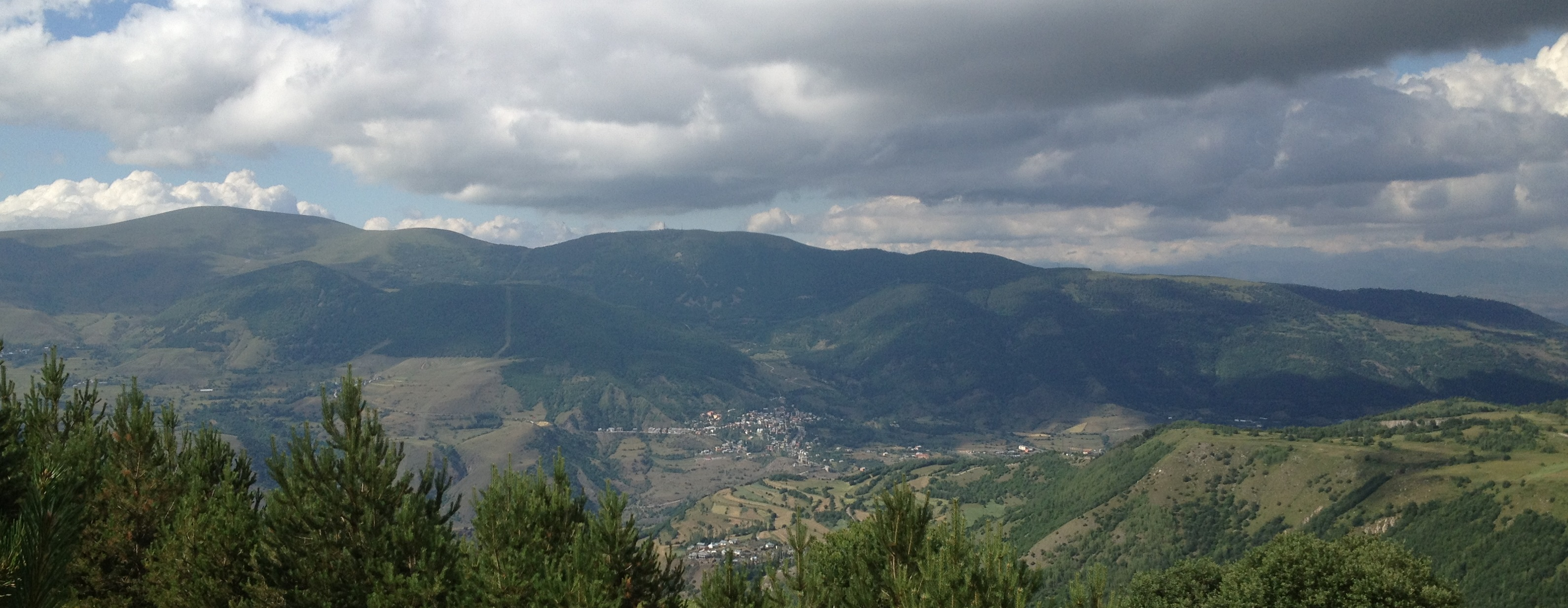
View of Posof from Ilgar Mountain

== Geography ==
Posof is high in the mountains near the source of the River Çoruh, much of the district is pine forest. The town consists of the quarters Merkez and Doğrular.

== History ==
Dighviri village, which formed the basis of the town of Posof, was a Georgian settlement when the Ottomans captured it from the Georgians. The inhabitants of the village were recorded as Turk in the 1886 Russian census. When Dighviri village became the administrative centre of the town of Posof in 1929, its name was also changed to Posof. In the 1940 general census, only 1,330 people lived in the town of Posof. By 1965, the town's population had risen to 1,540, of whom 818 were literate.
