= Uluçam, Posof =

Uluçam
- Village
- Location within Turkey
- Coordinates: 41.4623°N 42.6626°E
- Country: Turkey
- Province: Ardahan
- District: Posof
- Population (2021): 7
- Time zone: UTC+3 (TRT)

Uluçam is a village in the Posof District, Ardahan Province, Turkey. Its population is 7 (2021).

The former name of Uluçam village is Varkhana. Varkhana (ვარხანა) or Varkhani (ვარხანი) is a place name in historical Georgian geography. Varkhana also appears as Varkhana (وارخانە) in early Ottoman records.
