= Yurtbekler, Posof =

Village in Ardahan Province, Turkey

Yurtbekler
- Village
- Location within Turkey
- Coordinates: 41.5189°N 42.7964°E
- Country: Turkey
- Province: Ardahan
- District: Posof
- Population (2021): 146
- Time zone: UTC+3 (TRT)

Yurtbekler is a village in the Posof District, Ardahan Province, Turkey. The village is populated by Kurds of the Gelturan tribe and had a population of 136 in 2021.
