= Aşıkzülali, Posof =

Aşıkzülali
- Village
- Location within Turkey
- Coordinates: 41°26′N 42°40′E
- Country: Turkey
- Province: Ardahan
- District: Posof
- Population (2021): 212
- Time zone: UTC+3 (TRT)

Aşıkzülali is a village in the Posof District, Ardahan Province, Turkey. Its population is 212 (2021).
