= Süngülü, Posof =

Süngülü
- Village
- Location within Turkey
- Coordinates: 41°28′N 42°52′E
- Country: Turkey
- Province: Ardahan
- District: Posof
- Population (2021): 468
- Time zone: UTC+3 (TRT)

Süngülü is a village in the Posof District, Ardahan Province, Turkey. Its population is 468 (2021).
