= Erim, Posof =

Erim
- Village
- Location within Turkey
- Coordinates: 41°35′N 42°44′E
- Country: Turkey
- Province: Ardahan
- District: Posof
- Population (2021): 23
- Time zone: UTC+3 (TRT)

Erim is a village in the Posof District, Ardahan Province, Turkey. Its population is 23 (2021).
