= Gönülaçan, Posof =

Gönülaçan
- Village
- Location within Turkey
- Coordinates: 41°34′2″N 42°43′27″E
- Country: Turkey
- Province: Ardahan
- District: Posof
- Population (2021): 67
- Time zone: UTC+3 (TRT)

Gönülaçan is a village in the Posof District, Ardahan Province, Turkey. Its population is 67 (2021).
