= Batum oblast =

Oblast of the Russian Empire

Batum oblast Батумская область
- Oblast
- Coat of arms

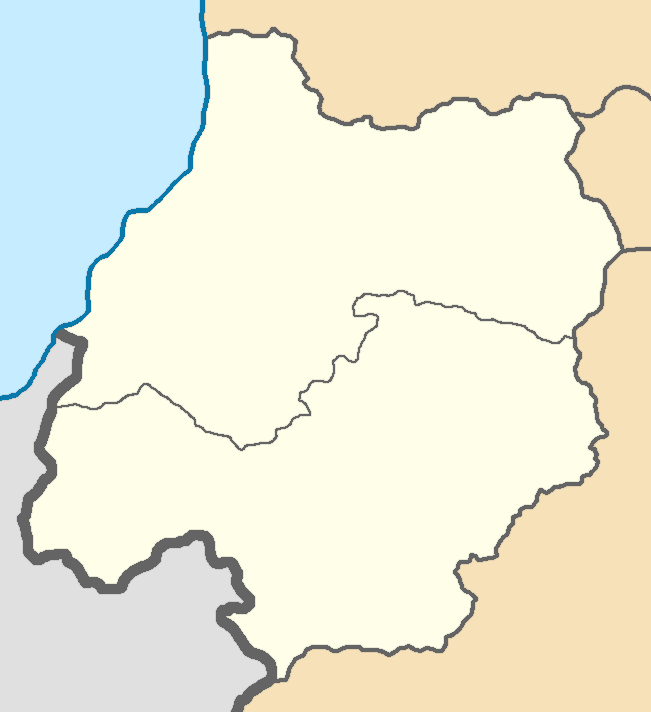
- Administrative map of the Batum Oblast
- Coordinates: 41°38′45″N 41°38′30″E
- Country: Russian Empire
- Viceroyalty: Caucasus
- Established: 1873
- Treaty of Brest-Litovsk: 3 March 1918
- Capital: Batum (present-day Batumi)

Area
  - Total: 6,975.65 km^{2} (2,693.31 sq mi)

Population (1916)
  - Total: 122,811
  - Density: 17.6057/km^{2} (45.5985/sq mi)
  - Urban: 22.00%
  - Rural: 78.00%

The Batum oblast (Note: Russian: Батумская область, romanized: Batumskaya oblast [bɐˈtumskəjə ˈobɫəsʲtʲ]; Georgian: ბათუმის ოლქი, romanized: batumis olki [b̥atʰumis olkʰi]; Turkish: Batum Oblastı [batum obɫastɯ]) was a province (oblast) of the Caucasus Viceroyalty of the Russian Empire, with the Black Sea port of Batum (present-day Batumi) as its administrative center. The Batum oblast roughly corresponded to the present-day Adjara autonomous region of Georgia, and most of the Artvin Province of Turkey.

== History ==
The Batum oblast was created out of the territories of the Ottoman Empire's sanjak of Batum following the region's annexation into the Russian Empire in the aftermath of the 1878 Russo-Turkish War. Established in 1878, the Batum Oblast was later downgraded to an okrug in 1883 and incorporated into the Kutais Governorate (until 1903).

According to the Treaty of Brest-Litovsk, the Russian SFSR ceded the Batum Oblast to the Ottoman Empire, however, the Transcaucasian Seim, the authority in Transcaucasia by 1918, rejected the treaty, opting to negotiate with the Ottoman Empire on its own terms. Such action led to the former's dissolution and the subsequent Treaty of Batum, which resulted in the inevitable reannexation of Batum to the Ottoman Empire.

After the Mudros Armistice, in which the Ottoman Empire was forced to withdraw its troops from the territories of the former Russian Transcaucasus including Batum, British troops under the 27th Division occupied the district to support the British military presence in the Transcaucasus, and to serve as a terminal for supplying Denikin's Volunteer Army.

The Batum Oblast was finally evacuated by the British in the summer of 1920, and handed over to the Democratic Republic of Georgia, whom administered the district until it was occupied by Turkish revolutionaries, leading to the Treaty of Kars which resulted in the partition of the district. The north including the port of Batum was retained by Georgia as an autonomy, and the southern Artvin district was incorporated into Turkey as the Artvin Province.

== Administrative divisions ==
The districts (okrugs) of the Batum oblast in 1917 were as follows:

Name	Administrative centre	Population		Area
Name	Administrative centre	1897	1916	Area
Artvin okrug (Артвинский округ)	Artvin	56,140	37,414	2,875.06 square versts (3,272.00 km^{2}; 1,263.33 mi^{2})
Batumi okrug (Батумский округ)	Batum (Batumi)	88,444	85,397	3,254.05 square versts (3,703.31 km^{2}; 1,429.86 mi^{2})

== Demographics ==
=== Russian Empire Census ===
According to the Russian Empire Census, the Batum oblast (at the time part of the Kutaisi Governorate) had a population of 144,584 on 28 January [O.S. 15 January] 1897, including 82,213 men and 62,371 women. The plurality of the population indicated Georgian to be their mother tongue, with significant Turkish, Armenian and Russian speaking minorities.

Linguistic composition of the Batum oblast in 1897
Language	Native speakers	%
Georgian	62,004	42.88
Turkish	44,667	30.89
Armenian	14,939	10.33
Russian	7,525	5.20
Greek	4,717	3.26
Ukrainian	2,351	1.63
Kurdish	1,811	1.25
Jewish	1,076	0.74
Polish	911	0.63
Persian	767	0.53
Abkhazian	693	0.48
Mingrelian	635	0.44
German	369	0.26
Imeretian	356	0.25
Tatar (Note: Before 1918, Azerbaijanis were generally known as "Tatars". This term, employed by the Russians, referred to Turkic-speaking Muslims of the South Caucasus. After 1918, with the establishment of the Azerbaijan Democratic Republic and "especially during the Soviet era", the Tatar group identified itself as "Azerbaijani".)	355	0.25
Lithuanian	157	0.11
Sartic	156	0.11
Belarusian	80	0.06
Avar-Andean	56	0.04
Kazi-Kumukh	47	0.03
English	38	0.03
Ossetian	29	0.02
Romanian	27	0.02
Svan	17	0.01
Estonian	11	0.01
Other	790	0.55
ТОТАL	144,584	100.00

=== Kavkazskiy kalendar ===
According to the 1917 publication of Kavkazskiy kalendar, the Batum oblast had a population of 122,811 on 14 January [O.S. 1 January] 1916, including 66,808 men and 56,003 women, 95,292 of whom were the permanent population, and 27,519 were temporary residents:

Nationality	Urban		Rural		TOTAL	
Nationality	Number	%	Number	%	Number	%
Georgians	7,363	27.25	71,476	74.61	78,839	64.20
Armenians	10,975	40.62	4,217	4.40	15,192	12.37
Sunni Muslims (Note: Primarily Turco-Tatars.)	75	0.28	14,267	14.89	14,342	11.68
Russians	5,042	18.66	3,503	3.66	8,545	6.96
Asiatic Christians	1,097	4.06	1,147	1.20	2,244	1.83
Other Europeans	855	3.16	120	0.13	975	0.79
Shia Muslims (Note: Primarily Tatars.)	529	1.96	165	0.17	694	0.57
North Caucasians	476	1.76	180	0.19	656	0.53
Jews	597	2.21	10	0.01	607	0.49
Kurds	8	0.03	544	0.57	552	0.45
Roma	0	0.00	165	0.17	165	0.13
TOTAL	27,017	100.00	95,794	100.00	122,811	100.00

== See also ==
- Artvin Okrug
- Batum Okrug
- Kars Oblast
- Treaty of Berlin (1878)
- Treaty of San Stefano

== Bibliography ==
- Bournoutian, George A. (2018). Armenia and Imperial Decline: The Yerevan Province, 1900–1914. Milton Park, Abingdon, Oxon: Routledge. ISBN 978-1-351-06260-2. OCLC 1037283914.
- Hovannisian, Richard G. (1971). The Republic of Armenia. Vol. 1: The First Year, 1918–1919. Berkeley: University of California Press. ISBN 978-0520019843.
- Кавказский календарь на 1917 год [Caucasian calendar for 1917] (in Russian) (72nd ed.). Tiflis: Tipografiya kantselyarii Ye.I.V. na Kavkaze, kazenny dom. 1917. Archived from the original on 4 November 2021.
- Tsutsiev, Arthur (2014). Atlas of the Ethno-Political History of the Caucasus (PDF). Translated by Nora Seligman Favorov. New Haven: Yale University Press. ISBN 9780300153088. Archived (PDF) from the original on 17 June 2023.
