= Artvin okrug =

Coordinates: 41°11′00″N 41°49′05″E

Artvin okrug Артвинский округ
- Okrug
- Coat of arms

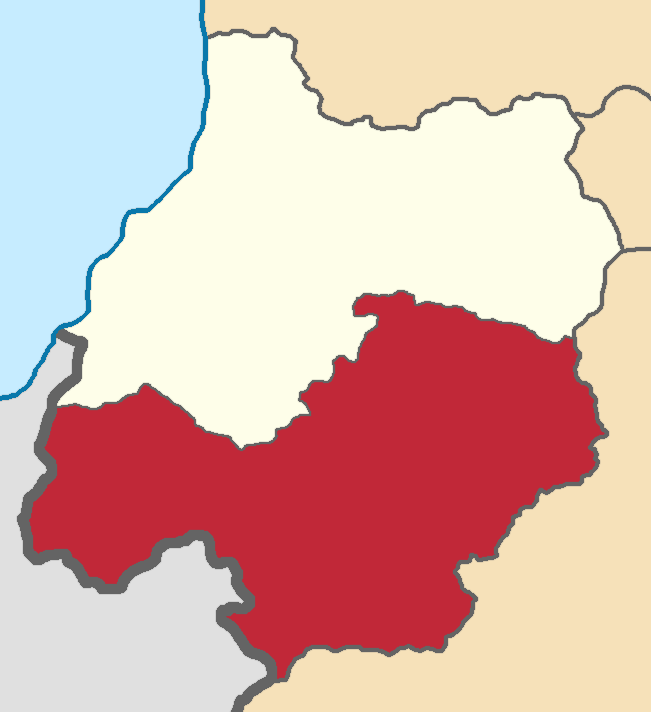
- Location in the Batum Oblast
- Country: Russian Empire
- Viceroyalty: Caucasus
- Oblast: Batum
- Established: 1878
- Treaty of Brest-Litovsk: 3 March 1918
- Capital: Artvin

Area
  - Total: 3,272.00 km^{2} (1,263.33 sq mi)

Population (1916)
  - Total: 37,414
  - Density: 11.435/km^{2} (29.615/sq mi)
  - Urban: 18.70%
  - Rural: 81.30%

The Artvin okrug (Note: Russian: Артвинский округ, pre-reform orthography: Артвинскій округъ, romanized: Artvinskiy okrug [ɐrtvʲɪnskʲɪj ɐkrʊk]; Turkish: Artvin Okrugu [aɾtvin okɾuɡu]; Armenian: Արդվինի գավառ, classical orthography: Արդուինի գաւառ, romanized: Arduini gawaṙ [ɑɹdviˈni ɡɑˈvɑr] (Note: Western Armenian pronunciation: [ɑɹtʰviˈni kʰɑˈvɑr]); Georgian: ართვინის ოკრუგი, romanized: artvinis ok'rugi [ˈaɾtʰʷinis ˈokʼɾuɡi]) was a district (okrug) of the Batum Oblast of the Russian Empire, existing between 1878 and 1918. The district was eponymously named for its administrative centre, Artvin, presently part of the Artvin Province of Turkey. The district bordered with the Olti okrug to the south, the Ardahan okrug to the east, the Batumi okrug to the north, and the Ottoman Empire to the west. Between 1883 and 1903, the Artvin okrug formed a part of the Kutaisi Governorate.

== Administrative divisions ==
The prefectures (участки, uchastki) of the Artvin okrug were:

| Name | Administrative centre | 1912 population | Area |
|---|---|---|---|
| Ardanuchskiy prefecture (Арданучский участок) | Ardanuch (Ardanuç) | 18,336 | 684.64 square versts (779.16 km^{2}; 300.84 mi^{2}) |
| Artvinskiy prefecture (Артвинский участок) | Artvin | 12,804 | 1,120.18 square versts (1,274.83 km^{2}; 492.22 mi^{2}) |
| Shavsheto-Imerkhevskiy prefecture (Шавшето-Имерхевский участок) | Satlel-Rabat | 23,780 | 1,070.24 square versts (1,218.00 km^{2}; 470.27 mi^{2}) |

== Demographics ==
=== Russian Empire Census ===
According to the Russian Empire Census, the Artvin okrug had a population of 56,140 on 28 January [O.S. 15 January] 1897, including 29,064 men and 27,076 women. The majority of the population indicated Turkish to be their mother tongue, with significant Armenian and Georgian speaking minorities.

Linguistic composition of the Artvin okrug in 1897
| Language | Native speakers | % |
|---|---|---|
| Turkish | 41,468 | 73.87 |
| Armenian | 7,819 | 13.93 |
| Georgian | 5,506 | 9.81 |
| Ukrainian | 714 | 1.27 |
| Russian | 308 | 0.55 |
| Kurdish | 112 | 0.20 |
| Greek | 67 | 0.12 |
| Polish | 21 | 0.04 |
| Imeretian | 15 | 0.03 |
| German | 13 | 0.02 |
| Abkhazian | 6 | 0.01 |
| Tatar (Note: Before 1918, Azerbaijanis were generally known as "Tatars". This term, employed by the Russians, referred to Turkic-speaking Muslims of the South Caucasus. After 1918, with the establishment of the Azerbaijan Democratic Republic and "especially during the Soviet era", the Tatar group identified itself as "Azerbaijani".) | 5 | 0.01 |
| Belarusian | 4 | 0.01 |
| Persian | 2 | 0.00 |
| Ossetian | 1 | 0.00 |
| Other | 79 | 0.14 |
| TOTAL | 56,140 | 100.00 |

=== Kavkazskiy kalendar ===
According to the 1917 publication of Kavkazskiy kalendar, the Artvin okrug had a population of 37,414 on 14 January [O.S. 1 January] 1916, including 19,276 men and 18,138 women, 33,945 of whom were the permanent population, and 3,469 were temporary residents:

| Nationality | Urban | | Rural | | TOTAL | |
| Nationality | Number | % | Number | % | Number | % |
|---|---|---|---|---|---|---|
| Georgians | 882 | 12.61 | 25,849 | 84.98 | 26,731 | 71.45 |
| Armenians | 5,451 | 77.90 | 3,977 | 13.07 | 9,428 | 25.20 |
| Russians | 217 | 3.10 | 109 | 0.36 | 326 | 0.87 |
| North Caucasians | 304 | 4.34 | 0 | 0.00 | 304 | 0.81 |
| Shia Muslims (Note: Primarily Tatars.) | 143 | 2.04 | 140 | 0.46 | 283 | 0.76 |
| Roma | 0 | 0.00 | 145 | 0.48 | 145 | 0.39 |
| Sunni Muslims (Note: Primarily Turco-Tatars.) | 0 | 0.00 | 104 | 0.34 | 104 | 0.28 |
| Asiatic Christians | 0 | 0.00 | 69 | 0.23 | 69 | 0.18 |
| Other Europeans | 0 | 0.00 | 24 | 0.08 | 24 | 0.06 |
| TOTAL | 6,997 | 100.00 | 30,417 | 100.00 | 37,414 | 100.00 |

== Bibliography ==
- Bournoutian, George A. (2018). Armenia and Imperial Decline: The Yerevan Province, 1900–1914. Milton Park, Abingdon, Oxon: Routledge. ISBN 978-1-351-06260-2. OCLC 1037283914.
- Hovannisian, Richard G. (1971). The Republic of Armenia. Vol. 1: The First Year, 1918–1919. Berkeley: University of California Press. ISBN 978-0520019843.
- Кавказский календарь на 1913 год [Caucasian calendar for 1913] (in Russian) (68th ed.). Tiflis: Tipografiya kantselyarii Ye.I.V. na Kavkaze, kazenny dom. 1913. Archived from the original on 19 April 2022.
- Кавказский календарь на 1917 год [Caucasian calendar for 1917] (in Russian) (72nd ed.). Tiflis: Tipografiya kantselyarii Ye.I.V. na Kavkaze, kazenny dom. 1917. Archived from the original on 4 November 2021.
- Tsutsiev, Arthur (2014). Atlas of the Ethno-Political History of the Caucasus (PDF). Translated by Nora Seligman Favorov. New Haven: Yale University Press. ISBN 9780300153088. Archived (PDF) from the original on 17 June 2023.

== See also ==
- Kars Oblast
- Treaty of San Stefano
- Treaty of Berlin (1878)
