= Posof District =

District of Ardahan Province, Turkey

- District
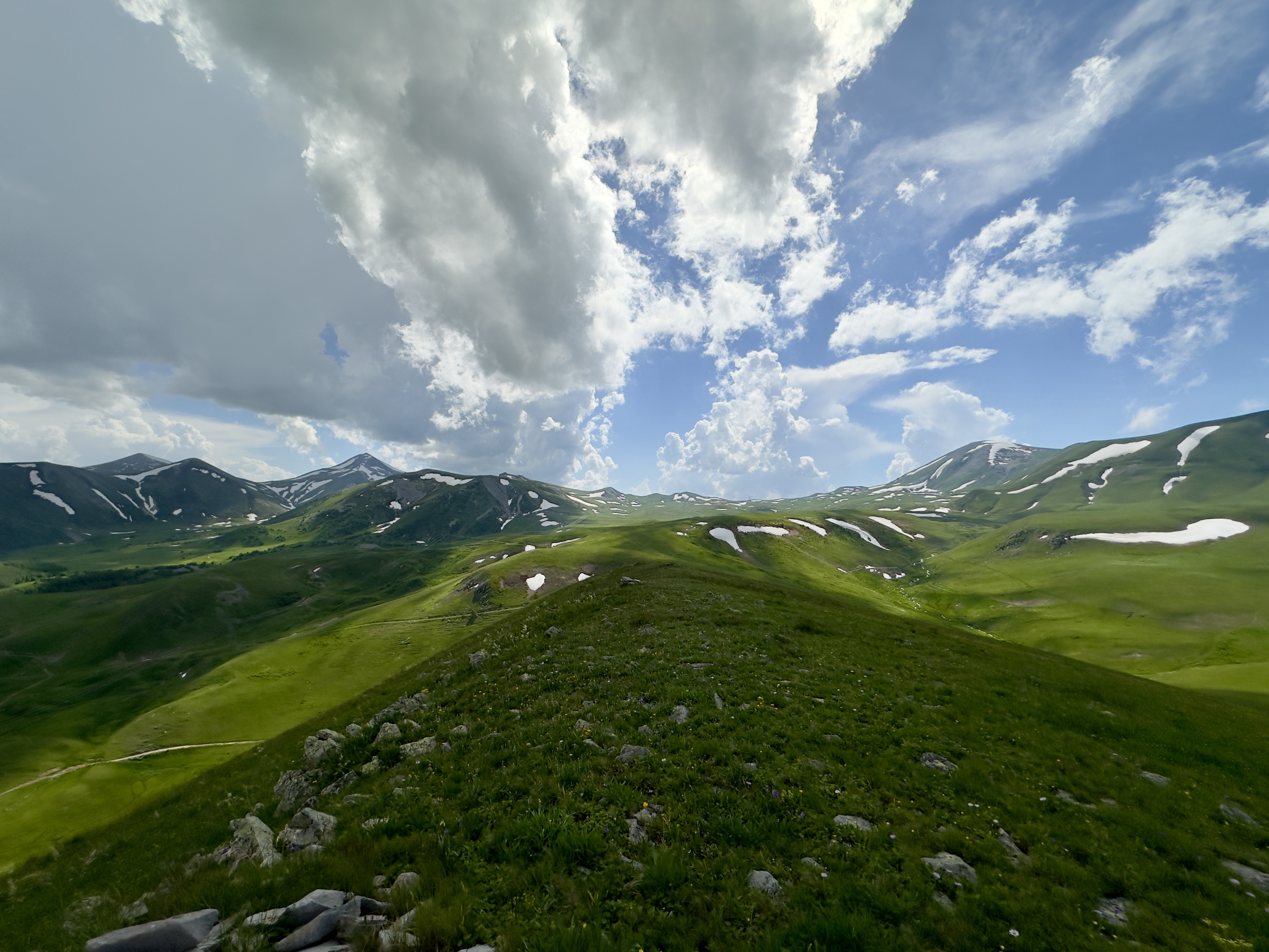
- yayla, Posof District

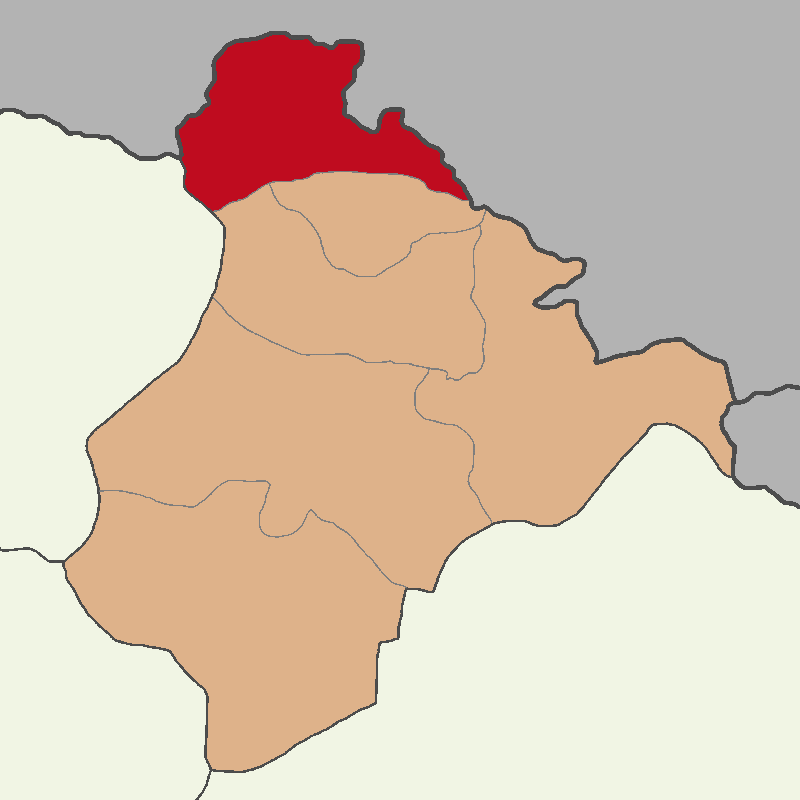
- Map showing Posof District in Ardahan Province

- Location within Turkey
- Coordinates: 41°08′N 43°08′E
- Country: Turkey
- Province: Ardahan
- Seat: Posof

Government
  - Kaymakam: Emrah Akduman
- Area: 583 km^{2} (225 sq mi)
- Population (2021): 6,448
  - Density: 11.1/km^{2} (28.6/sq mi)
- Time zone: UTC+3 (TRT)
- Website: www.posof.gov.tr

Posof District is a district of Ardahan Province of Turkey. Its seat is the town Posof. Its area is 583 km^{2}, and its population is 6,448 (2021). It has a border crossing with neighboring Georgia at Türkgözü.

== Composition ==
There is one municipality in Posof District:

- Posof

There are 48 villages in Posof District (former names also given):

- Akballı Oboli / ობოლი)
- Alabalık (Saikhve / საიხვე)
- Alköy (Al / ალი)
- Arılı (Zedatzminda / ზედაწმინდა)
- Armutveren (Papala / ფაფალა)
- Asmakonak (Samkhula / სამხულა)
- Aşıküzeyir (Khevati / ხევათი)
- Aşıkzülali (Tzurtzkabi / წურწყაბი)
- Balgöze (Chrdileti / ჩრდილეთი)
- Baykent (Vakhla / ვახლა)
- Binbaşıeminbey (Chilvana / ჭილვანა)
- Çakırkoç (Mere / მერე)
- Çambeli (Sakire / საკირე)
- Çamyazı (Okhteli / ოხთელი)
- Çayırçimen (Lamiani / ლამიანი)
- Demirdöver (Vardzna / ვარძნა)
- Derindere
- Erim (Erema / ერემა)
- Gönülaçan (Shuatzkali / შუაწყალი)
- Gümüşkavak (Zeindari / ზეინდარი)
- Günbatan (Banarhevi / ბანარხევი)
- Günlüce (Chaboria / ჭაბორია)
- Gürarmut (Kvelistzkali / ყველისწყალი)
- İncedere (Chuanteli / ჭუანთელი)
- Kaleönü (Agara / აგარა)
- Kalkankaya (Pedobani / პეტობანი)
- Kayınlı (Shughlauri / შუღლაური)
- Kırköy (Keri / ქერი)
- Kolköy (Kveli / ყველი or ყუელი)
- Kopuzlu (Chorchovani / ჩორჩოვანი)
- Kumlukoz (Hgvime / ღვიმე)
- Kurşunçavuş (Seja / სეჯა)
- Özbaşı (Ghvinia / ღვინია)
- Sarıçiçek (Khertvisi / ხერთვისი)
- Sarıdarı (Stepantzminda / სტეფანწმინდა)
- Savaşır (Chanchahi / ჭანჭახი)
- Söğütlükaya (Khunamisi /ხუნამისი)
- Süngülü (Arila / არილა)
- Sütoluk (Satkepela / სატყეპელა)
- Taşkıran (Giorgisubani / გიორგისუბანი)
- Türkgözü (Badela / ბადელა)
- Uğurca (Zemo Jajuni / ზემო ჯაჯუნი)
- Uluçam (Varkhani & ვარხანი)
- Yaylaaltı (Satleli / სათლელი)
- Yeniköy
- Yolağzı (Tzitelsatibi / წითელსათიბი)
- Yurtbaşı (Sakabalo / საკაბალო)
- Yurtbekler (Jakistzkali / ჯაყისწყალი)
