= Ates =

Ates is a given name and a surname which may refer to:

- Roscoe Ates (1895–1962), American vaudeville performer, actor, comedian and musician
- Sonny Ates (1935–2010), American racecar driver
- Ates Diouf (born 2000), Senegalese footballer
- Ates Gürpinar (born 1984), German politician

== See also ==
- Aquifer thermal energy storage (ATES), subsurface storage of heat
- Ateş (disambiguation)
