= Durucasu =

Durucasu can refer to:

- Durucasu, Göle
- Durucasu, Osmancık
- Durucasu, Taşova
