= Budaklı =

Budaklı can refer to:

- Budaklı, Gerger
- Budaklı, Göle
- Budaklı, Karaçoban
- Budaklı, Midyat
