= Filizli =

Filizli can refer to:

- Filizli, Göle
- Filizli, Olur
