= Gürsel Tekin =

Turkish politician (born 1964)

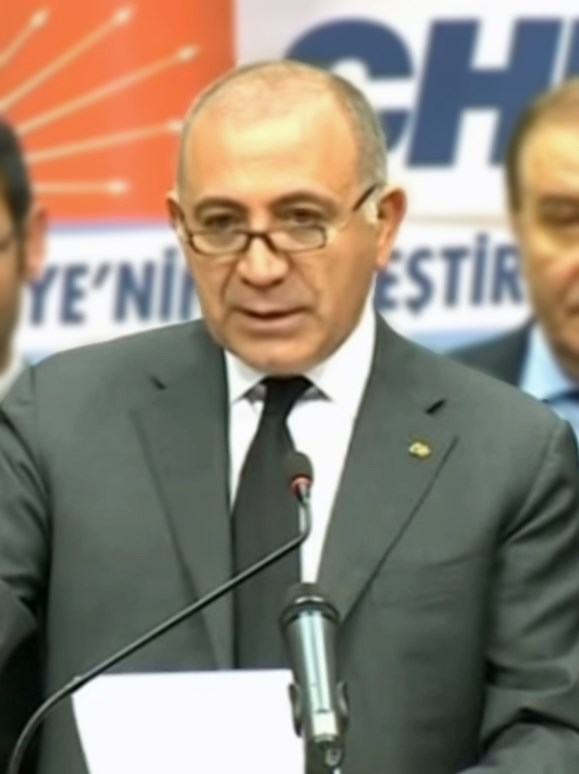

General Secretary of the Republican People's Party
- In office 8 May 2014 – 24 January 2015
- Leader: Kemal Kılıçdaroğlu
- Preceded by: Bihlun Tamaylıgil
- Succeeded by: Kamil Okyay Sındır

Deputy leader of the Republican People's Party responsible for communications
- In office 4 August 2010 – 14 September 2014
- Leader: Kemal Kılıçdaroğlu

Member of the Grand National Assembly
- In office 12 June 2011 – 3 June 2023
- Constituency: İstanbul (I) (2011, June 2015, Nov 2015, 2018)

Personal details
- Born: 6 January 1964 (age 61) Karlıyazı, Göle, Ardahan, Turkey
- Political party: Republican People's Party (1995–2025)

Gürsel Tekin (born 6 January 1964 in Ardahan, Turkey) is a Turkish politician of Kurdish descent and a former vice-president of the Republican People's Party (CHP). On September 2. 2025, after being appointed as a trustee to the CHP Istanbul Provincial Organization by court order, he was expelled from the party.

== Biography ==
Gürsel Tekin was born in the Karlıyazı (Kırziyan) village of the Göle District of Ardahan Province, Turkey. Tekin received his high school diploma from Kars Alparslan Lisesi (Kars Alparslan High School). Then he studied Turkish Literature Faculty at Atatürk University but he did not continue to school because of economic problems. Then he came to Istanbul for his military service.

== Political career ==
First he was the member of SODEP (Social Democracy Party) (Turkish: Sosyal Demokrasi Partisi). Then SODEP fused with HP to become SHP. In 1995 SHP and CHP came together. In 1999 Tekin became vice-mayor of Kadıköy and also in 1999 and 2004 he entered in Istanbul Municipality Council. Then in 2007 he became the provincial CHP chairman of Istanbul Province. Gürsel Tekin also worked with Kemal Kılıçdaroğlu on local elections in 2009. On 4 August 2010 he was chosen vice-president for the party. His suggestion, that the Peoples' Democratic Party (HDP) could be given a ministry if the CHP wins the elections in 2023, drew ire from the politicians of the Good Party (iYi), while Kılıçdaroğlu also denied this possibility. The HDP spokesperson Ebru Günay refuted the possibility of joining the opposition bloc called Table of Six.
