= Beşiktaş J.K. 0–0 Antalyaspor (2023) =

Football match in Turkey

On 26 February 2023, a football game of the Turkish Süper Lig between Beşiktaş J.K. from Istanbul and Antalyaspor from Antalya took place at the Vodafone Park in Istanbul. During the match, fans threw stuffed toys on the pitch for children affected by the Turkey–Syria earthquakes earlier that month.

== Background ==
On 6 February 2023, a series of powerful earthquakes hit southern Turkey and northern Syria, causing over 45,000 deaths. The Turkish government was criticized for its insufficient response to the earthquake by fans of Fenerbahçe S.K. and Beşiktaş.

== Match ==
The match was stopped at 4 minutes and 17 seconds, in memory of the victims of the earthquake which took place at 04:17 (TRT). Fans hurled toys, berets and scarves on the football pitch as a show of support for children affected in the earthquake region, while the names of the affected provinces were displayed on the stadium billboard. The move, which was called "this toy is my friend", was organized by the fans themselves prior to the match, when the toys were distributed among them in a coordinated manner.

Fans also called on the Turkish government to resign. They protested over the lack of responses the government gave in the aftermath of the earthquake. A video from the online news portal Haber depicted protesters being expelled from the tribune by the police.

== Aftermath ==
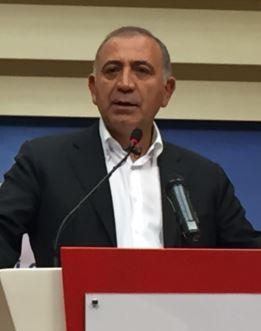
Gürsel Tekin announced that he would pay Beşiktaş J.K. the dues of the politicians who cancelled their memberships of the club.

Devlet Bahçeli, the leader of the far-right Nationalist Movement Party (MHP) and a political ally of President Recep Tayyip Erdoğan, fiercely criticized calls for the government to resign and canceled his membership of Beşiktaş. MPs Sermet Ay and Semih Yalçın of the MHP and Yavuz Subaşı of the Justice and Development Party (AKP) also made similar moves in support of the government. Gürsel Tekin, a Republican Peoples Party (CHP) lawmaker, said that he would pay Beşiktaş the dues of the politicians who cancelled their memberships.

== See also ==
- Fenerbahçe S.K. 4–0 Konyaspor (2023)
