= Göle =

- Municipality
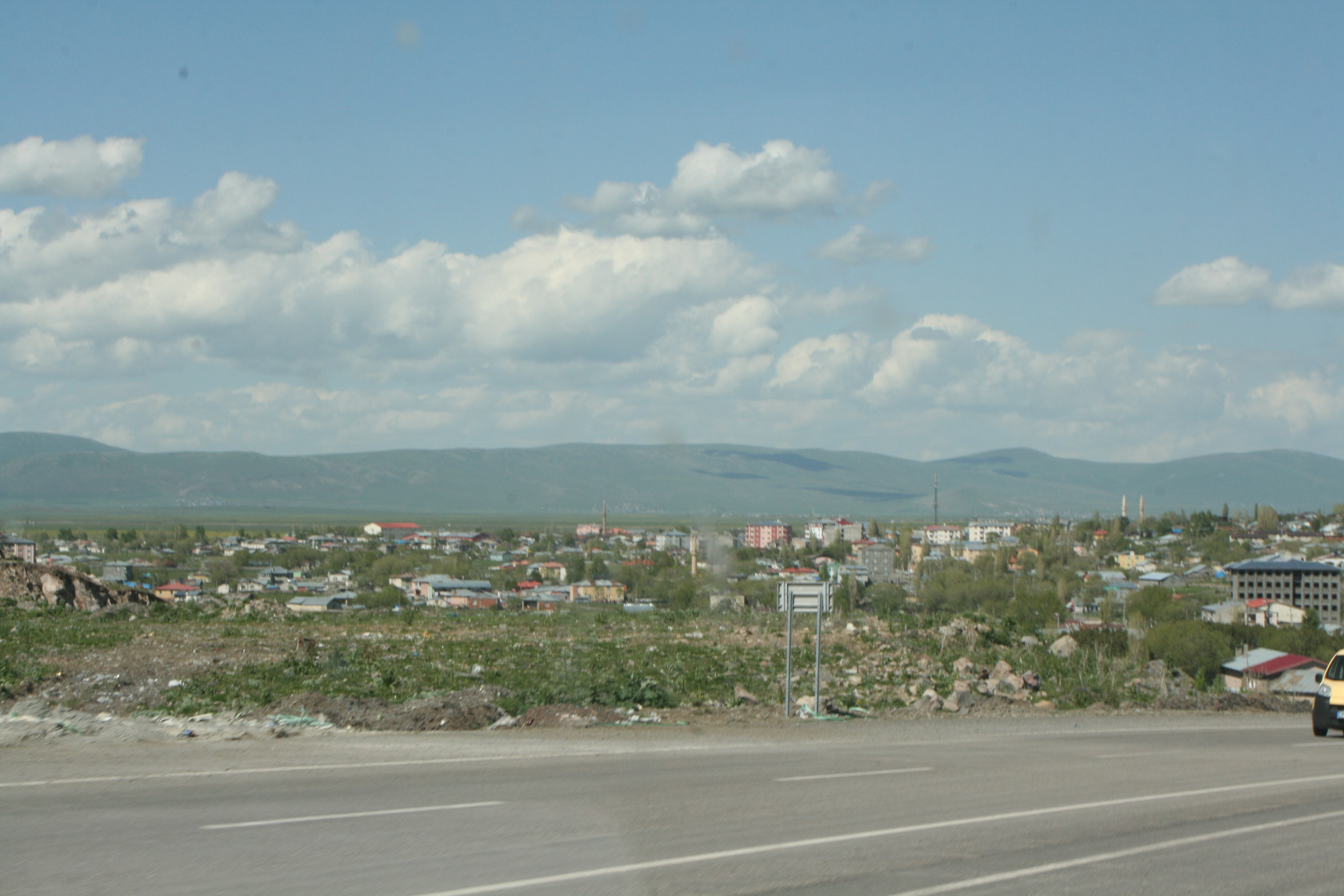

- Location within Turkey
- Coordinates: 40°47′34″N 42°36′31″E
- Country: Turkey
- Province: Ardahan
- District: Göle
- Elevation: 2,038 m (6,686 ft)
- Population (2021): 5,775
- Time zone: UTC+3 (TRT)
- Postal code: 75700
- Website: www.gole.bel.tr

Göle (Armenian: Կող, romanized: Kogh; Georgian: კოლა, romanized: k'ola; Kurdish: Mêrdînik) is a small city in Ardahan Province of Turkey. The city was formerly known as Merdenik, Merdinik or Ardahan-ı Küçük ("Little Ardahan" in Ottoman Turkish). It is the seat of Göle District. Its population is 5,775 (2021).

== Etymology ==
In Armenian, Göle is known as Kogh (Կող), Merdenek (Մերդենեկ), or Merrrenek (Մեռենեկ), also being renamed to Martenik (Մարտենիք) in 1918. In Greek, the town is known as Gkióle (Γκιόλε) or Mertenék (Μερτενέκ). In Georgian, it is known as Kola (კოლა).

== History ==
The name derives from Armenian name—Kogh—which may, in turn, derive from ancient kingdom of Colchis. In ancient times this land was part of Urartu. In 4th century BC, it was part of Kingdom of Iberia and remained as one of the district of Duchy of Tsunda. Since 2nd century BC to 4th century AD this place was a part of Greater Armenia. During subsequent centuries it frequently changed hands between Iberians and Armenians. In the 7th century it passed to the Arab Caliphate. In 8th century it became part of Kuropalatine of Iberia in struggle against the Arab occupation. During the 10th–15th centuries, this region was a part of the united Georgian Kingdom. In the 16th century, it was within the independent Principality of Samtskhe until it was occupied and annexed by the Ottoman Empire and organized into the Childir Eyalet. Merdenek was annexed by the Russian Empire in 1878, where it was part of the militarily administered Kars Oblast, specifically within the Gelsky uchastok (subcounty) of the Ardahan Okrug. The district included villages inhabited by various ethnic groups, including 40 Turkish and 13 Caucasian Greek villages. Merdenek was briefly occupied by the Ottoman Empire by virtue of the Treaty of Brest-Litovsk, however, following their withdrawal in 1919, Armenian control prevailed until late 1920. During the Turkish–Armenian War, the town was occupied by Democratic Republic of Georgia; in 1921, it was annexed by Turkey, as confirmed by the Treaty of Kars.

Places of interest to visitors include the tomb and mosque in the village of Dedeşen and the castles of Kalecik and Ugurtaşı.

== Notable people ==
- İsmail Ateş (born 1960), artist and professor
