= Kuzupınarı =

Kuzupınarı can refer to:

- Kuzupınarı, Göle
- Kuzupınarı, Yenice
- Kuzupınarı, Yumurtalık
