= Ateş =

Ateş (pronounced [ˈateʃ]) is a Turkish word of Persian origin meaning "fire", and may refer to:

== People ==
=== Given name ===
- Ateş Çınar (born 1986), Turkish yacht racer

=== Surname ===
- Berkay Ateş (born 1987), Turkish actor
- Ceyda Ateş (born 1988), Turkish actress
- İsmail Ateş (born 1960), Turkish artist and professor
- Kezban Çağla Ateş (born 1988), Turkish female volleyball player
- Levent Ateş (born 1991), Turkish middle-distance runner
- Necati Ateş (born 1980), Turkish football player
- Nejla Ateş (1932–2005), Turkish belly dancer
- Seyran Ateş (born 1963), German lawyer
- Toktamış Ateş (1944–2013), Turkish academic, political commentator and writer

== Other uses ==
- Ateş (newspaper), a Turkish newspaper published from 1995 to 1999
- Ateş (album), a 2019 album by Turkish singer Demet Akalın
- Atesh, a Ukrainian and Crimean Tatar military partisan movement

== See also ==
- Ates, a given name and a surname
