= Uğurtaşı, Göle =

Village in Ardahan Province, Turkey

Uğurtaşı
- Village
- Location within Turkey
- Coordinates: 40.9363°N 42.4761°E
- Country: Turkey
- Province: Ardahan
- District: Göle
- Population (2021): 218
- Time zone: UTC+3 (TRT)

Uğurtaşı is a village in the Göle District, Ardahan Province, Turkey. Its population is 218 (2021). The village is populated by Karapapakhs.
