= Samandöken, Göle =

Village in Ardahan Province, Turkey

Samandöken
- Village
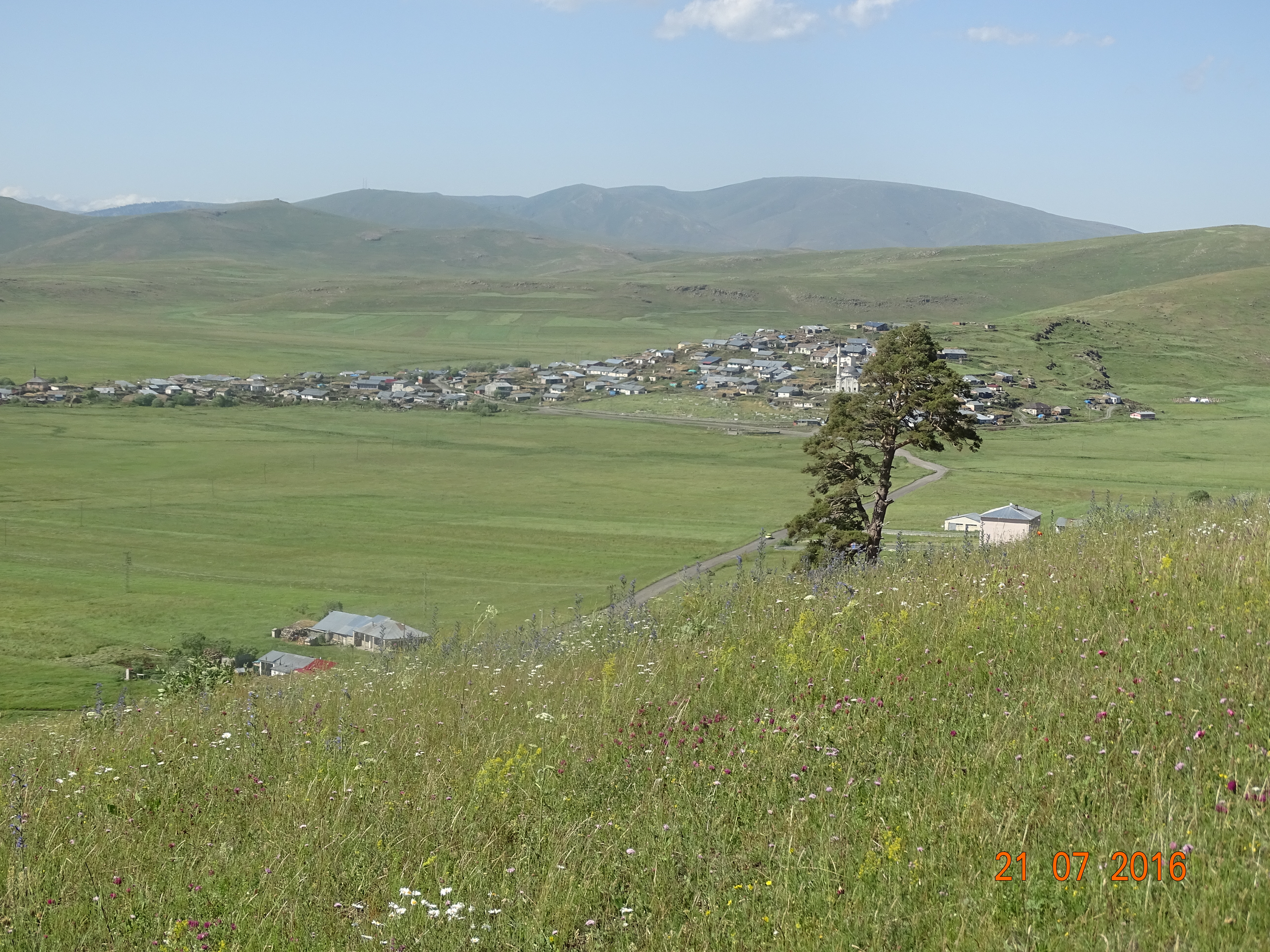

- Location within Turkey
- Coordinates: 40.8424°N 42.5096°E
- Country: Turkey
- Province: Ardahan
- District: Göle
- Population (2021): 788
- Time zone: UTC+3 (TRT)

Samandöken (Kurdish: Sinot) is a village in the Göle District, Ardahan Province, Turkey. The village is populated by Kurds and had a population of 788 in 2021. Samandoken is one of the biggest villages of Göle District.

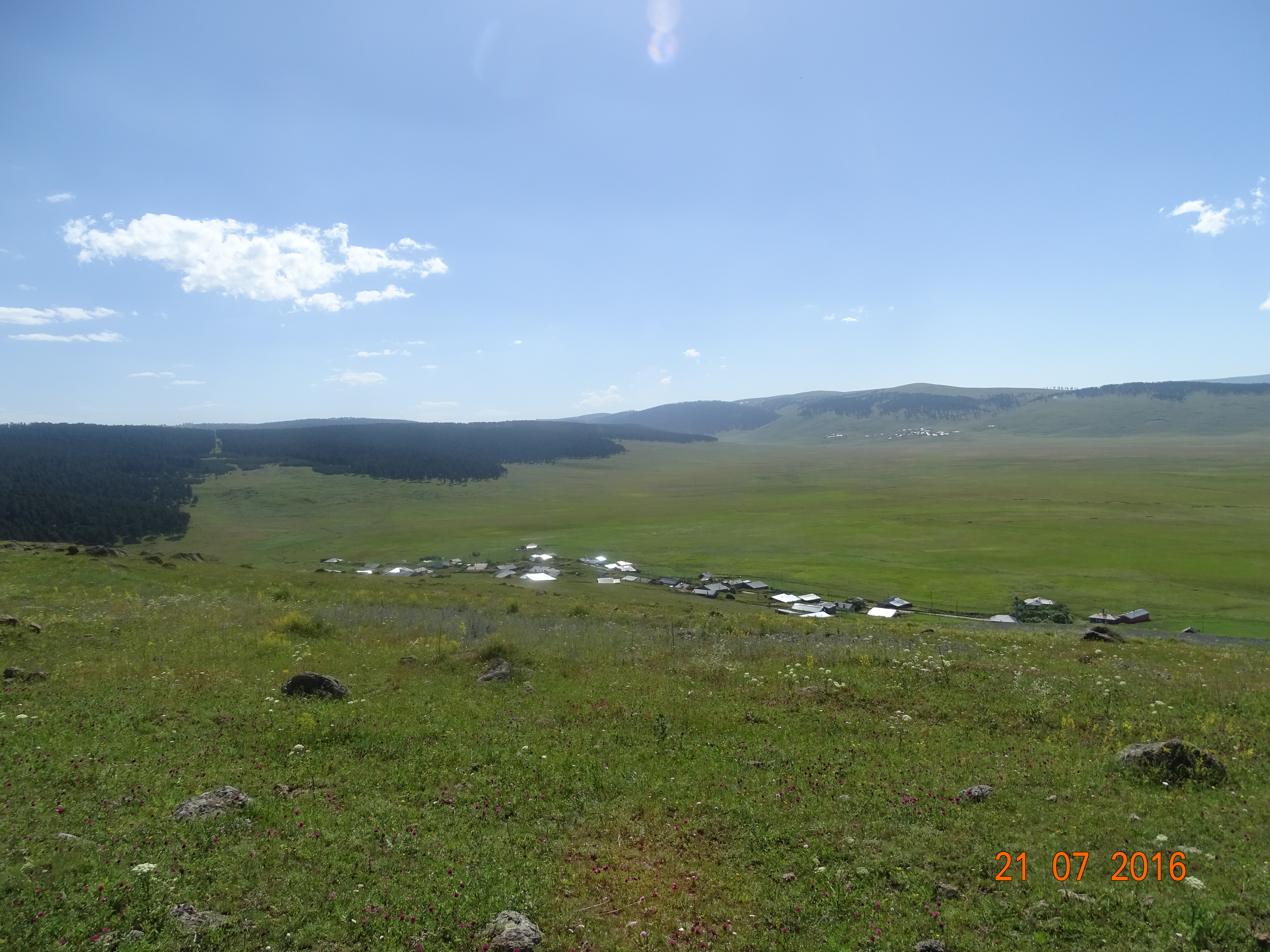
Samandoken Gozeler (Natural Springs) region (in front of the forest line) in the winter village

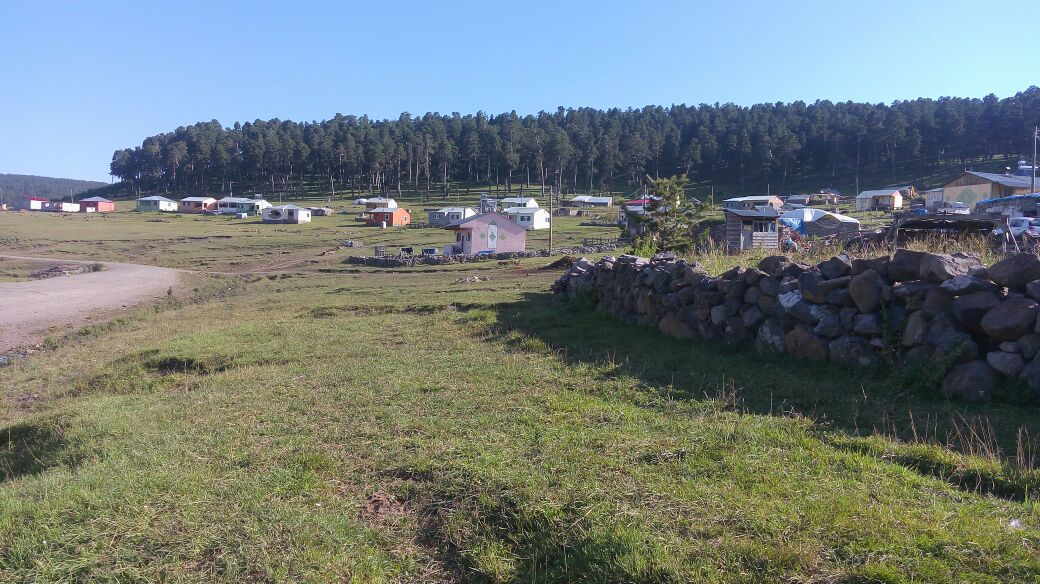
Samandoken village summer pasture (yayla)
