= Koyunlu, Göle =

Village in Ardahan Province, Turkey

Koyunlu
- Village
- Location within Turkey
- Coordinates: 40.7952°N 42.7734°E
- Country: Turkey
- Province: Ardahan
- District: Göle
- Population (2021): 480
- Time zone: UTC+3 (TRT)

Koyunlu (Kurdish: Kundik) is a village in the Göle District, Ardahan Province, Turkey. The village is populated by Kurds and had a population of 456 in 2021.
