= Gülistan, Göle =

Village in Ardahan Province, Turkey

Gülistan
- Village
- Location within Turkey
- Coordinates: 40.8712°N 42.7727°E
- Country: Turkey
- Province: Ardahan
- District: Göle
- Population (2021): 120
- Time zone: UTC+3 (TRT)

Gülistan is a village in the Göle District, Ardahan Province, Turkey. The village is populated by Kurds of the Şadiyan tribe and had a population of 120 in 2021.
