= Kuzupınarı, Göle =

Kuzupınarı
- Neighbourhood
- Location in Turkey
- Coordinates: 40.9162°N 42.4806°E
- Country: Turkey
- Province: Ardahan
- District: Göle
- Municipality: Köprülü
- Population (2021): 194
- Time zone: UTC+3 (TRT)

Kuzupınarı is a neighbourhood of the town Köprülü, Göle District, Ardahan Province, Turkey. Its population is 194 (2021).
