= Arpaşen, Göle =

Village in Ardahan Province, Turkey

Arpaşen
- Village
- Location within Turkey
- Coordinates: 40°54′N 42°47′E
- Country: Turkey
- Province: Ardahan
- District: Göle
- Population (2021): 454
- Time zone: UTC+3 (TRT)

Arpaşen, formerly Ağılyolu, is a village in the Göle District, Ardahan Province, Turkey. The village is populated by Kurds and had a population of 454 in 2021.
