= Kuytuca =

Village in Ardahan Province, Turkey

- Village
- Location within Turkey
- Coordinates: 40°46′N 42°45′E
- Country: Turkey
- Province: Ardahan
- District: Göle
- Elevation: 2,070 m (6,790 ft)
- Population (2021): 729
- Time zone: UTC+3 (TRT)
- Postal code: 75700
- Area code: 0478

Kuytuca is a village in Göle District of Ardahan Province, Turkey. The village is populated by Kurds and had a population of 729 in 2021.
