= Çayırbaşı, Göle =

Village in Ardahan Province, Turkey

Çayırbaşı
- Village
- Location within Turkey
- Coordinates: 40.8766°N 42.6290°E
- Country: Turkey
- Province: Ardahan
- District: Göle
- Population (2021): 302
- Time zone: UTC+3 (TRT)

Çayırbaşı is a village in the Göle District, Ardahan Province, Turkey. Its population is 302 (2021). The village is populated by Karapapakhs.
