= Kayaaltı, Göle =

Kayaaltı
- Village
- Location within Turkey
- Country: Turkey
- Province: Ardahan
- District: Göle
- Population (2021): 482
- Time zone: UTC+3 (TRT)

Kayaaltı (formerly Anzav or Andzavi) is a village in the Göle District, Ardahan Province, Turkey. Its population is 482 (2021).
