= Köprülü, Göle =

Town in Ardahan Province, Turkey

Köprülü
- Municipality
- Location in Turkey
- Coordinates: 40°53′N 42°28′E
- Country: Turkey
- Province: Ardahan
- District: Göle
- Elevation: 2,125 m (6,972 ft)
- Population (2021): 2,102
- Time zone: UTC+3 (TRT)
- Postal code: 75780
- Area code: 0478

Köprülü (Armenian: Քարավանք, romanized: Qaravanq), (formerly Korehenk) is a town (belde) in the Göle District, Ardahan Province, Turkey. Its population is 2,102 (2021).

The town is populated by Kurds.

== Geography ==
The distance to Göle is 25 kilometres (16 mi) and its distance to Ardahan is 75 kilometres (47 mi). The town consists of 3 quarters: Dedeşen, Durançam and Kuzupınarı.
