= Yeniköy, Göle =

Village in Ardahan Province, Turkey

Yeniköy
- Village
- Location within Turkey
- Coordinates: 40°59′6″N 42°26′26″E
- Country: Turkey
- Province: Ardahan
- District: Göle
- Population (2021): 668
- Time zone: UTC+3 (TRT)

Yeniköy is a village in the Göle District, Ardahan Province, Turkey. The village is populated by Kurds of the Canbeg tribe and had a population of 668 in 2021.
