= Damlasu, Göle =

Village in Ardahan Province, Turkey

Damlasu
- Village
- Location within Turkey
- Coordinates: 40°59′54″N 42°38′47″E
- Country: Turkey
- Province: Ardahan
- District: Göle
- Elevation: 2,100 m (6,900 ft)
- Population (2021): 25
- Time zone: UTC+3 (TRT)

Damlasu is a village in the Göle District, Ardahan Province, Turkey. The village is populated by Kurds and had a population of 25 in 2021.
