= Esenboğaz, Göle =

Village in Ardahan Province, Turkey

Esenboğaz
- Village
- Location within Turkey
- Coordinates: 40°45′N 42°41′E
- Country: Turkey
- Province: Ardahan
- District: Göle
- Population (2021): 248
- Time zone: UTC+3 (TRT)

Esenboğaz is a village in the Göle District, Ardahan Province, Turkey. The village is populated by Kurds and had a population of 248 in 2021.
