= Yeleçli, Göle =

Yeleçli
- Village
- Location within Turkey
- Coordinates: 40°56′N 42°30′E
- Country: Turkey
- Province: Ardahan
- District: Göle
- Population (2021): 111
- Time zone: UTC+3 (TRT)

Yeleçli is a village in the Göle District, Ardahan Province, Turkey. Its population is 111 (2021).
