= Dereyolu, Göle =

Village in Ardahan Province, Turkey

Dereyolu
- Village
- Location within Turkey
- Coordinates: 40.8349°N 42.5996°E
- Country: Turkey
- Province: Ardahan
- District: Göle
- Population (2021): 277
- Time zone: UTC+3 (TRT)

Dereyolu (Kurdish: Salut) is a village in the Göle District, Ardahan Province, Turkey. The village is populated by Kurds and had a population of 277 in 2021.
