= Yiğitkonağı, Göle =

Village in Ardahan Province, Turkey

Yiğitkonağı
- Village
- Location within Turkey
- Coordinates: 40°57′N 42°34′E
- Country: Turkey
- Province: Ardahan
- District: Göle
- Population (2021): 157
- Time zone: UTC+3 (TRT)

Yiğitkonağı is a village in the Göle District, Ardahan Province, Turkey. Its population is 157 (2021). The village is populated by Karapapakhs.
