= Tellioğlu, Göle =

Village in Ardahan Province, Turkey

Tellioğlu
- Village
- Location within Turkey
- Coordinates: 40.9132°N 42.7005°E
- Country: Turkey
- Province: Ardahan
- District: Göle
- Population (2021): 198
- Time zone: UTC+3 (TRT)

Tellioğlu is a village in the Göle District, Ardahan Province, Turkey. The village is populated by Kurds and had a population of 198 in 2021.
