= Çullu, Göle =

Village in Ardahan Province, Turkey

Çullu
- Village
- Location within Turkey
- Coordinates: 40°46′46″N 42°48′58″E
- Country: Turkey
- Province: Ardahan
- District: Göle
- Population (2021): 93
- Time zone: UTC+3 (TRT)

Çullu is a village in the Göle District, Ardahan Province, Turkey. The village is populated by Karapapakhs and Kurds and had a population of 93 in 2021.
