= Caucasus Greeks =

Ethnic group

Russian Map of the Caucasus and north-eastern Anatolia, 1903

The Caucasus Greeks (Greek: Έλληνες του Καυκάσου or more commonly Καυκάσιοι Έλληνες, Turkish: Kafkas Rum), also known as the Greeks of Transcaucasia and Russian Asia Minor, are the ethnic Greeks of the North Caucasus and Transcaucasia in what is now southwestern Russia, Georgia, and northeastern Turkey. These specifically include the Pontic Greeks, though they today span a much wider region including the Russian north Caucasus, and the former Russian Caucasus provinces of the Batum Oblast and the Kars Oblast (the so-called Russian Asia Minor), now in north-eastern Turkey and Adjara in Georgia.

Greek people migrated into these areas well before the Christian/Byzantine era. Traders, Christian Orthodox scholars/clerics, refugees, mercenaries, and those who had backed the wrong side in the many civil wars and periods of political in-fighting in the Classical/Hellenistic and Late Roman/Byzantine periods, were especially represented among those who migrated. One notable example is the 7th-century Greek Bishop Cyrus of Alexandria, originally from Phasis in present-day Georgia. Greek settlers in the Caucasus generally became assimilated into the indigenous population, particularly in Georgia, where Byzantine Greeks shared a common Christian Orthodox faith and heritage with the natives.

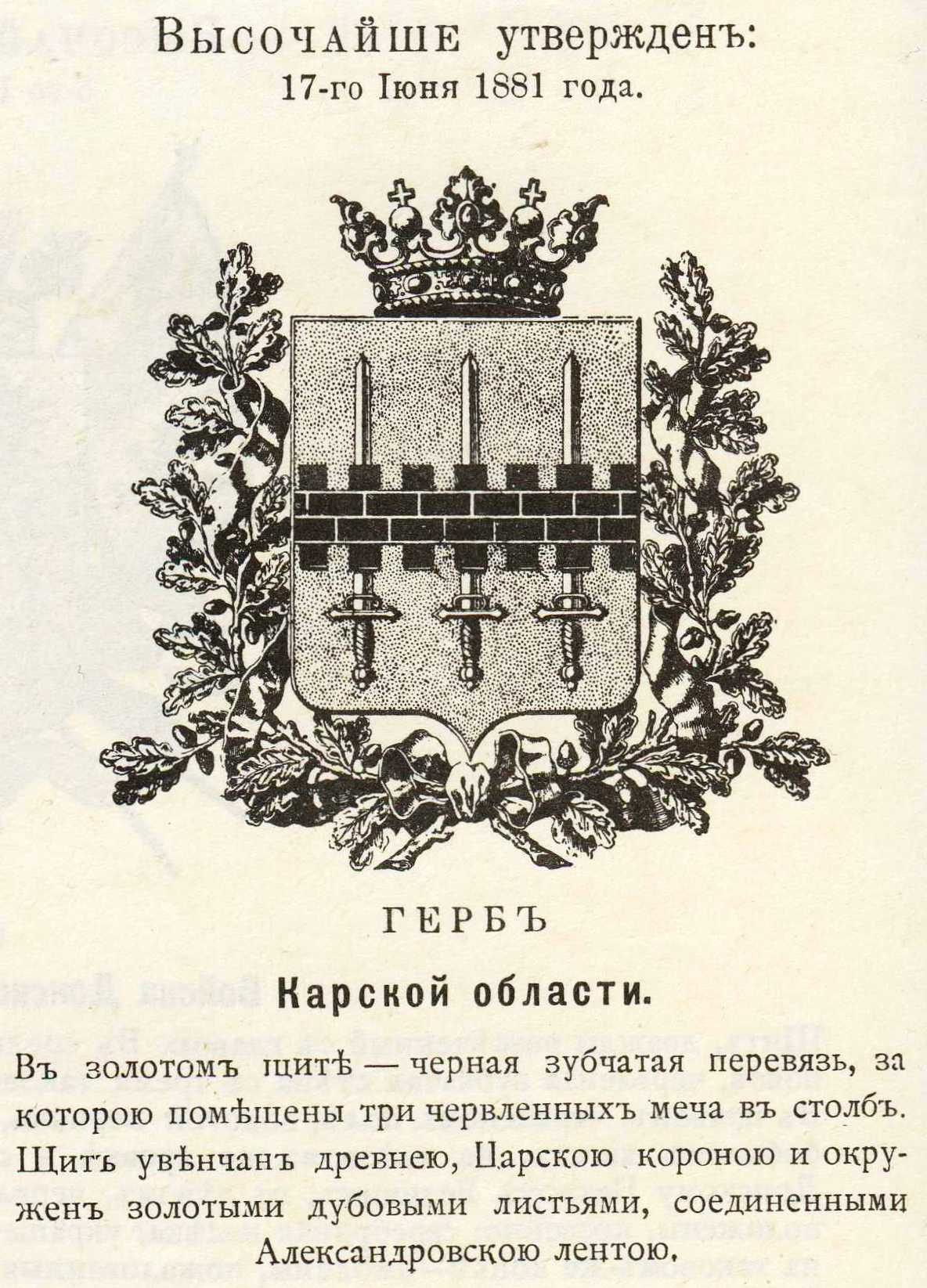
Official Russian Empire coat of arms of Kars Oblast (1881-1899).

The vast majority of these Greek communities date from the late Ottoman era, and are usually defined in modern Greek academic circles as 'Eastern Pontic [Greeks]' (modern Greek - ανατολικοί Πόντιοι, modern Turkish 'doğu Pontos Rum'), as well as 'Caucasus Greeks', while outside academic discourse they are sometimes defined somewhat pejoratively and inaccurately as 'Russo-Pontic [Greeks]' (modern Greek - Ρωσο-Πόντιοι). Nevertheless, in general terms Caucasus Greeks can be described as Russianized and pro-Russian empire Pontic Greeks in politics and culture and as Mountain Greeks in terms of lifestyle, since wherever they settled, whether in their original homelands in the Pontic Alps or Eastern Anatolia, or Georgia and the Lesser Caucasus, they preferred and were most used to living in mountainous areas and especially highland plateaux. In broad terms, it can be said that the Caucasus Greeks' link with the South Caucasus is a direct consequence of the highland plateaux of the latter being seen and used by the Pontic Greeks as a natural refuge and rallying point whenever North-eastern Anatolia was overrun by Muslim Turks in the Seljuk and Ottoman periods.

== Ancient and medieval history ==
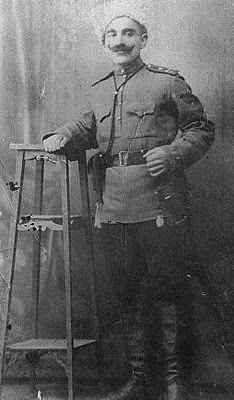
Caucasus Greek officer from Mouzarat (now Çakırüzüm köyü), Ardahan district, former Russian south Caucasus province of Kars Oblast

Although large numbers of Greeks live in parts of Ukraine and southern Russia, such as Mariupol and Stavropol Krai, the term Caucasus Greeks strictly speaking should be confined to those Greeks who had settled in the former Russian Transcaucasus provinces of Batum and Kars Oblast, parts of Georgia such as the region around Tsalka, central Abkhazia and other localities of the Black Sea Russian Riviera.

Following the Ottoman conquest of the Empire of Trebizond in 1461 large numbers of Pontic Greeks left the Pontic Alps region as refugees and resettled in parts of the South Caucasus, and particularly Georgia. Even the son of King David of Trebizond's son George had fled there with his retinue and married a Georgian princess of the Gurieli dynasty. However, the numbers of these early Pontic Greek refugees to Georgia were in any case probably fairly small, and so although some of the refugees managed to retain their Pontic Greek language and identity, others assimilated through intermarriage into the other Christian communities of the South Caucasus region, particularly their fellow Christian Orthodox Georgians but also those Armenians or Ossetians who were Orthodox.

== Early modern period ==
Many so-called "Ottoman Turks" who settled in Georgia and the South Caucasus following Lala Mustafa Pasha's Caucasian campaign of the 1570s were actually Pontic Greeks from northeastern Anatolia who had adopted Islam and the Turkish language for official purposes but continued to use Pontic Greek in their daily lives, with one prominent example of an Ottoman Muslim Georgian of Pontic Greek origin being Resid Mehmed Pasha. These Greek Muslims who adhered to Islam in Georgia also either eventually assimilated with the Turkish-speaking Muslim population of southern Georgia usually defined as Meskhetian Turks, returned to parts of eastern Anatolia such as Kars following the Russian annexation of Georgia in 1801, or reverted to their Greek Orthodoxy following the annexation and reintegrated into the Greek Orthodox population of the country. Finally, according to available historical evidence we know that thousands of Pontic Greeks from Ottoman north-eastern Anatolia and especially the Gümüşhane (Greek Argyroupolis) region of the Pontic Alps are known to have gone to Georgia in 1763 on being invited by King Heraclius II of Georgia to develop silver and lead mining at Akhtala and Alaverdi (in present-day Armenia). Many of their descendants survive in Georgia’s Marneuli district and Armenia's Akhtala region, although most immigrated to Greece, and particularly Thessaloniki (Salonika) in Greek Macedonia in the mid-1990s.

It is difficult to verify the numbers of all such waves of Pontic Greeks from the Pontic Alps region to Georgia and the South Caucasus between circa 1520 and 1800, which according to Anthony Bryer is the most obscure period in the history of Pontus and the Pontic Greeks, owing to the scarcity of contemporary Greek and Ottoman Turkish sources on the subject. Modern historians suggest that following the Ottoman conquest of 1461, many, if not most Pontic Greeks retreated up into the highlands, where it was easier to maintain their culture and freedom from the encroachments of the Ottoman authorities. This movement was reinforced in the early 1600s by the growing power along the coastal valleys districts of the derebeys ('valley lords'), which further encouraged Pontic Greeks to retreat away from the coast deeper into the highlands and up onto the eastern Anatolian plateau, before some moved further east into the neighbouring Lesser Caucasus around Kars and southern Georgia. Modern historians also suggests that a major migratory movement of Pontic Greeks onto the eastern Anatolian plateau and the Lesser Caucasus occurred in the reign of Sultan Mehmed IV (1648–87), during which a common pattern was initiated in Ottoman history: the Ottomans and their clients the Crimean Tatars suffered a string of severe defeats at the hands of the expansionist Russian Empire and so followed this up with a wave of repression against the Greeks of both the southern Balkans and the Pontic Alps region, on the pretext that Greek statesmen and traders had colluded with the Tsar. As a result, many Pontic Greeks felt pressured into following their cousins who had left Pontus as refugees in previous generations, and so they too decided to migrate to southern Russia or neighbouring Georgia and the South Caucasus.

However, the largest number of Pontic Greeks from north-eastern Anatolia who settled in Georgia, according to extant historical evidence, were those who fled Ottoman reprisals following the 1768-74 Russo-Turkish war, the Greek War of Independence, the 1828-29 Russo-Turkish War, and the war of 1853-56, which unlike earlier such movements are more widely attested in documentary evidence and traditionally cited by many Pontic Greeks themselves. In the war of 1828-29 many north-eastern Anatolia Greeks welcomed, collaborated with, or fought in the Russian Army that occupied Erzurum, Gümüşhane, Erzinjan, and Kars (all now in north-eastern Turkey). Most of their descendants settled in Georgia (in areas such as Tsalka and Samtskhe-Javakheti), the Russian Trans-Caucasus, and other parts of southern Russia. A smaller number of such Pontic Greeks had of course settled in Georgia and the Russian Caucasus well before the Russo-Turkish wars, most notably those belonging to noble and landowning families from the pre-Ottoman Empire of Trebizond. These included several members of the late Byzantine Komnenos or Comnenid dynasty and collateral branches, who often married into princely families from neighbouring Georgia, including those of the Bagrationi and especially the Gurieli and Andronikashvili. Among those who remained in the Pontic Alps and north-eastern Anatolia some led local revolts against the Ottomans, while many others actually intermarried into the Ottoman ruling elite, thereby converting to Islam and joining the Turkish millet.

Several Ottoman-era sources tell us, however, that even among Pontic Greeks belonging to local noble families - such as those of Gavras, Doukas and the Komnenoi - who had turned Turk, many remained Crypto-Christian (in north-eastern Anatolia often referred to as Stavriotes), openly renouncing Islam and taking up arms against Ottoman troops based around Gümüşhane and Erzinjan during the Russo-Turkish wars, before following the Russian army back into Georgia and southern Russia. It was some of these Pontic Greek community leaders that claimed noble lineages extending back to the Empire of Trebizond who subsequently became officers in the Russian Imperial army, as many Armenian and Georgian princes such as Ivane Andronikashvili had previously done. These Caucasus Greek officers, whether of noble Byzantine or more humble Pontic Greek origin, played a significant role in the 1877 Russian conquest of Kars and Ardahan, where many of them settled with their families and other displaced Greeks from northeast Anatolia and Georgia (the latter themselves the descendants of pre-1877 Greek refugees and exiles from northeast Anatolia now re-settled in Kars by the Russian Imperial government).

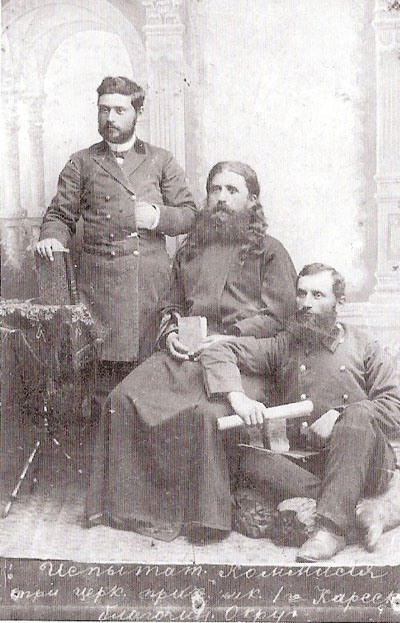
Caucasus Greek cleric and community leaders

== Language ==
A large number of Caucasus Greeks who settled in Georgia became referred to as Urums (from the Turkish word for '[Byzantine] Romans') and spoke a Turkish dialect with a large admixture of Pontic Greek, Georgian, and Armenian vocabulary. According to local Greek legend, after the suppression of their revolt against Ottoman rule, these Turkish-speaking but Christian Orthodox Caucasus Greeks had been given the choice by Sultan Selim I either to accept Islam but continue to use their Greek mother tongue, or to use the Turkish language but retain their Christian Orthodox faith. Selim I had been based in the Trebizond region before he became Sultan in 1512, since he was himself of partly Pontic Greek origin on the side of his mother Gülbahar Hatun.

Nevertheless, most Caucasus Greeks had never had to face this predicament of having to choose between their Christian Orthodox faith and their Pontic Greek language and so were able to retain both, although when in Russian territory they eventually came to adopt Russian as their second language for public and educational purposes. Caucasus Greeks also often maintained some command of Turkish as more or less a third language, thanks to their own roots in north-eastern Anatolia, where they had after all lived (usually very uneasily and in a state of intermittent warfare) alongside Turkish-speaking Muslims since the Seljuk-backed Turkish migrations into 'the lands of Rum' or Anatolia during the 11th and 12th centuries. Pontic Greeks in Georgia and the Russian Caucasus also maintained this command of Turkish so as to communicate with their Muslim neighbours living in the region, most of whom used Turkish as a lingua franca or even adopted it as their first language irrespective of actual ethnic origin. This situation is in stark contrast to that of the Greek Muslims of western Greek Macedonia called Vallahades and the Cretan Muslims, both of whom generally remained ignorant of Turkish, continued to use Greek as their first language, and retained Greek culture and traditions long after converting to Islam in the middle Ottoman period. Of course, while many Pontic Greeks and Caucasus Greeks had also adopted Islam as early as the 1500s or before, these "new Turks" generally either adopted Turkish and then assimilated into the Turkish-speaking Muslim Ottoman population or they remained Crypto-Christian and then openly reverted to their Christian Orthodoxy on the occasion of the 1828 Russian occupation of northeastern Anatolia or after the passing of the Ottoman Reform Edict of 1856.

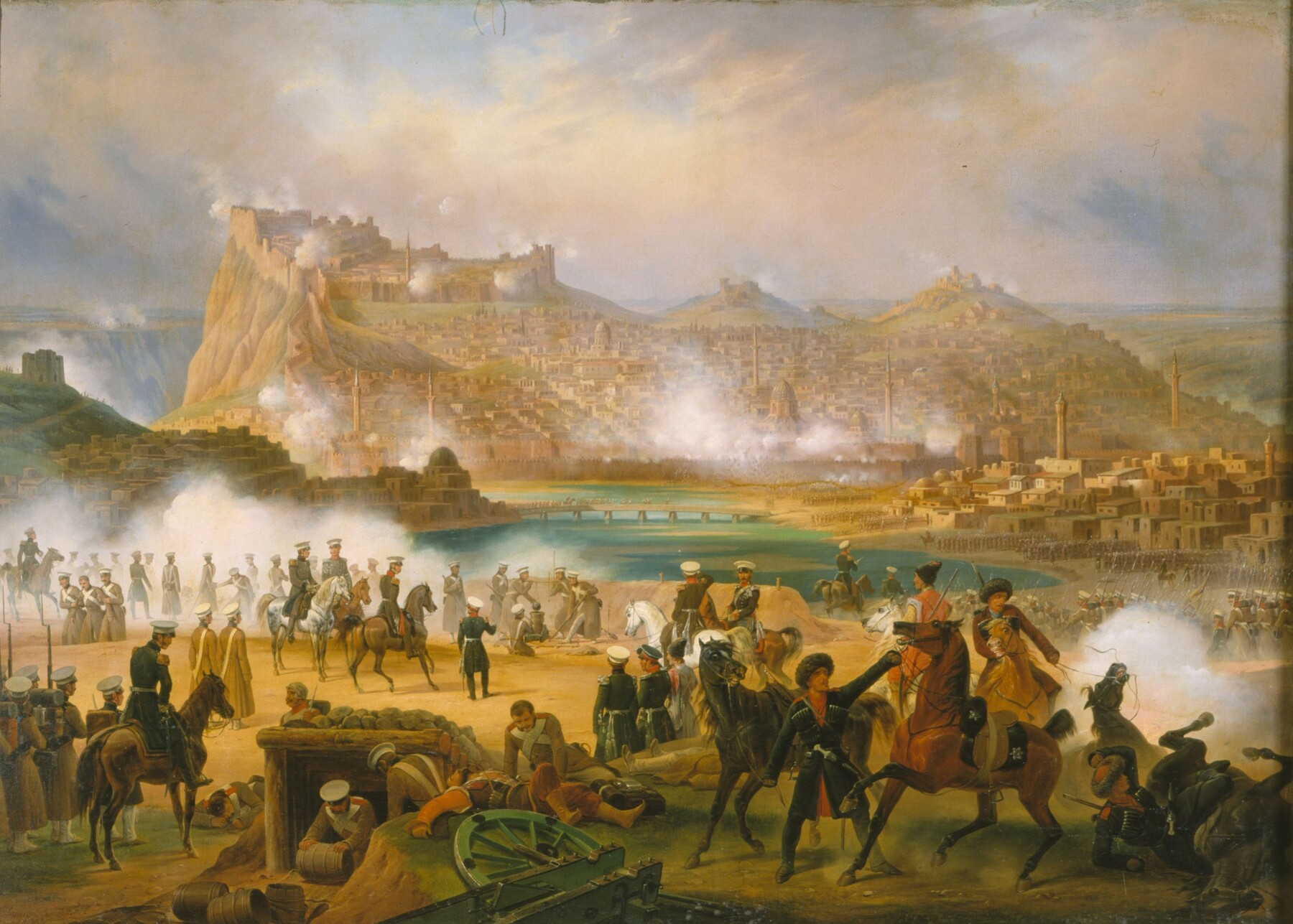
Russian siege of Kars, 1828

It should be stressed, then, that the vast majority of these eastern Pontic Greeks who had settled in southern Russia, Georgia, and the Trans-Caucasus region but preserved their distinct Greek identity were mainly the descendants of the Greeks who left the Pontic Alps and the northeast Anatolian highland region after the Russo-Turkish wars of 1768-74 and 1828–29. Contrary to certain popular myths, these Pontic Greek settlers therefore had absolutely nothing to do with those Greeks who had settled in the South Caucasus region in the Hellenistic or Classical Greek period, although they generally did merge with those somewhat smaller Pontic Greek communities who had settled in Georgia, Armenia, and the South Caucasus in general in the late Byzantine and early Ottoman period. The main reason Caucasus Greeks preferred to identify themselves exclusively with the later, particularly 19th century waves of Pontic Greek refugees to the South Caucasus rather than also with ancestors who had already settled in the region in the late Byzantine or early Ottoman period is probably because this helped in the presentation of their history as being linked for a longer period to the territories ruled by the Empire of Trebizond, that is Pontus proper, and also helped minimize the historically inconvenient evidence of both substantial non-Greek influences on their culture and extensive intermarriage with the indigenous, non-Hellenic races of the South Caucasus region.

According to conservative estimates these eastern Pontic Greeks who collaborated with and/or followed the Russian army into Georgia and southern Russia following the 1828 Russian occupation of Erzurum and Gümüşhane had made up around 20% of the entire Greek population of the eastern Black Sea coastline and the Pontic Alps that formed its mountain hinterland. They were subsequently resettled by the Russian Imperial government in Ukraine and other parts of southern Russia, but also especially Georgia and (after 1878) Kars Oblast. Like those Pontic Greeks who fought for Russia in the 1768-74 Russo-Turkish war, most male Greeks who settled in Russian territory following the 1828-29 war continued to serve in the Russian Imperial army, often bearing their own community's hopes to re-capture more Christian Greek territory from the Muslim Turks on the back of the Russian Empire. Like Georgians, Armenians, and other peoples from the South Caucasus, many Caucasus Greek men fought and lost their lives through service in the Russian army not just in wars against the Ottomans, but also in other campaigns, such as the 1817-1864 Caucasian War, in which Russia sought to impose its rule over the Muslim mountain tribes of the north Caucasus.

== Role in Russian conquests ==
The 1877-78 Russo-Turkish War and the Treaty of San Stefano and Treaty of Berlin that brought it to a close led to the Russian Empire making permanent gains at the expense of the Ottoman Empire in north-eastern Anatolia. These centred around the fortified city of Kars in historical northern Armenia, which Russia now administered as the Kars Oblast, i.e. the militarily administered province of Kars, which also included the towns and districts of Ardahan and Sarikamish. As in the 1828-29 war, many Greeks of north-eastern Anatolia and Pontus fought in or collaborated with the Imperial Russian Army in the 1877-78 war against the Ottomans, often serving as soldiers and officers in an army that included large numbers of Georgians, Armenians, Ossetians and Cossack, as well as Russians proper - the Georgians and Armenians in particular being represented among the senior ranks. Although the Ottoman province or 'vilayet' of Kars already had several Greek villages dating back to 1830 or sometimes even earlier, most of these later pro-Russian Greeks of north-eastern Ottoman Anatolia settled in Kars province after it was incorporated into the Russian empire in 1878.

It was precisely because most of the Greek settlers in the Kars Oblast had entered the region with the Russians from the direction of Georgia, that contemporaries - and academics later on - came to define them as Caucasus Greeks or Russianized Pontic Greeks, in contrast to those Greeks who had never left Ottoman-ruled North-eastern Anatolia. Even in Russian occupied Georgia, however, these Greeks had generally lived in the southern areas of the country which - like the Kars-Ardahan region - were part of the Lesser Caucasus highland plateau, rather than among the deep valleys and jagged mountain peaks of the High Caucasus range in northern Georgia. In terms of population, the areas in both Georgia and Kars province inhabited by the Caucasus Greeks tended to be those that also had large concentrations of Armenian populations – one well-known product of this Greek-Armenian mix being the famous mystic and theosophist George Gurdjieff. Another well known, although more recent Caucasus Greek with roots in these areas but born in Tbilisi was Yanis Kanidis, a Russian PE instructor and hero of the Beslan school hostage crisis in North Ossetia. These same areas now in Georgia also had various pockets of Muslims of Turkish and non-Turkish (convert) ethnic origin - though the latter had generally become Turkish in speech and culture.

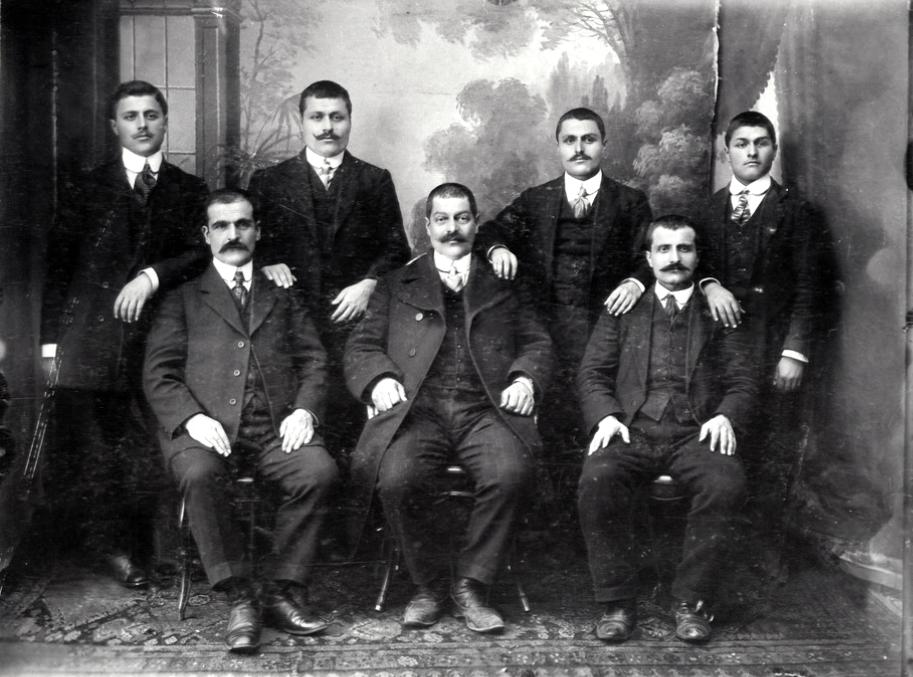
Pontic Greek leaders from Georgia

The Caucasus Greeks of the Kars Oblast were mainly concentrated in around 77 towns and villages as part of official Russian government policy to people a traditionally Turkish, Kurdish, Georgian-Muslim (here often called Chveneburi) and Laz-Muslim or Christian but generally non-Orthodox Armenian area with a staunchly pro-Russian Christian Orthodox community. In general they were settled on grassy highland plateaux, such as the Gole/Kiolias plateau of present-day Ardahan province, since these resembled their original lands in the Pontic Alps and later ones they had settled on in Georgia. In towns like Kars, Ardahan, and Sarikamish ethnic Greeks constituted only a small minority (10-15%) of the inhabitants, most of whom were Christian Armenians, Kurdish Muslims, or smaller numbers of Orthodox Georgians, while even many of the mainly ethnic Greek villages still included small numbers of Armenians (including Greek Orthodox Armenians), Georgians, and even Kurds, employed by the Greeks to look after the sheep, cattle, and horses. The Caucasus Greeks of the Kars Oblast were generally reasonably well educated, every village having its own school, although most were involved in farming, horse breeding, or mining for their livelihoods. A smaller but still significant number did, however, work outside the agricultural and mining sectors. In particular, many pursued careers as regular soldiers and officers in the Russian Imperial Army, in the regional police force, as clergymen, or even within the provincial Russian administration. Unlike the Pontic Greeks of the Black Sea coastal cities like Trebizond, however, very few Caucasus Greeks were involved in trade.

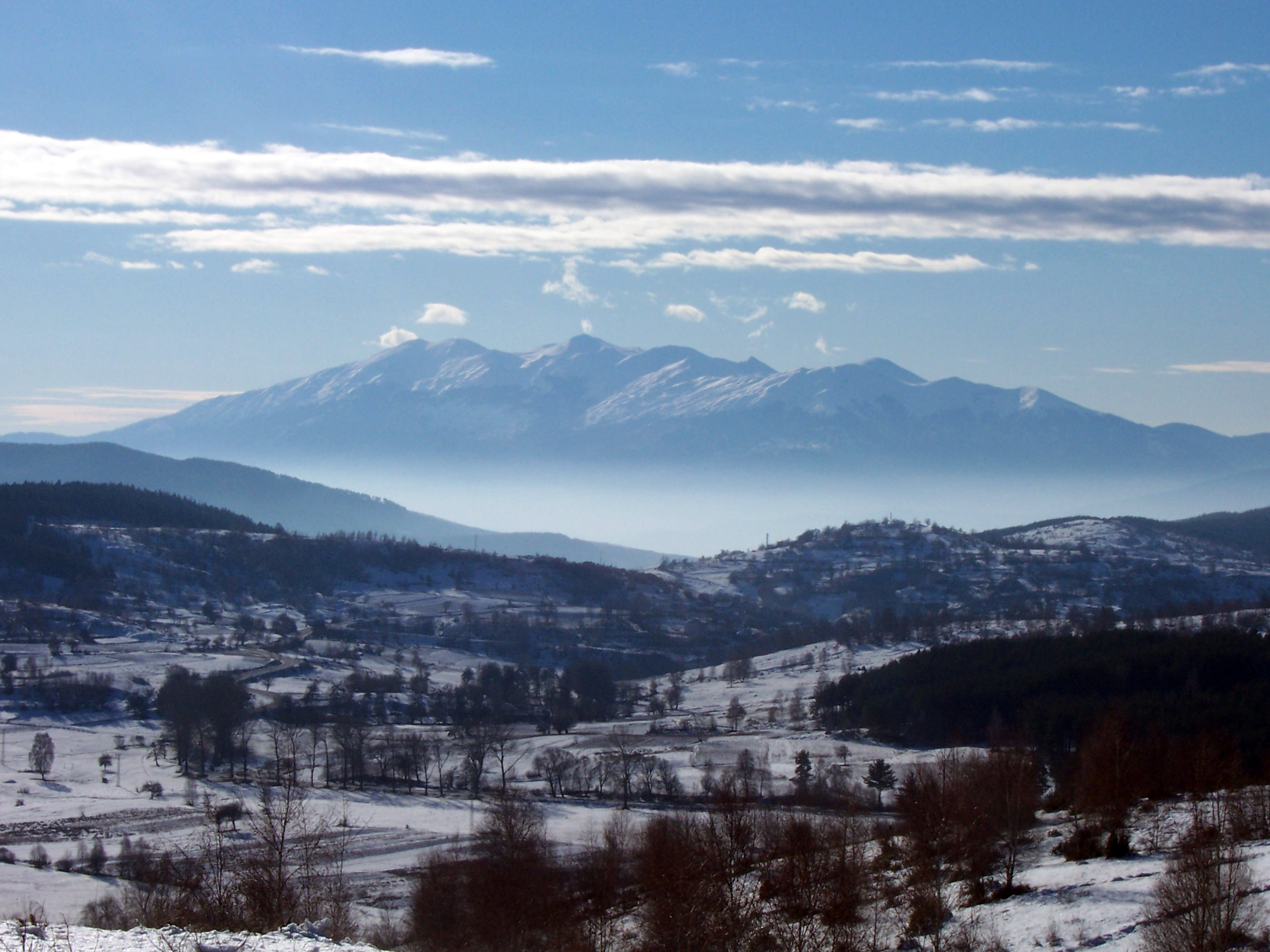
Mount Falakro, Drama Prefecture, eastern Greek Macedonia, where many Pontic Greeks and Caucasus Greeks resettled

Caucasus Greeks were often multilingual, able to speak, read, and write Greek and Russian and speak Eastern Anatolian Turkish, and sometimes also basic Georgian and Armenian. Although their native language was Greek, generally only the most highly educated - such as scholars, lawyers, members of the Orthodox clergy educated in Russian universities, and other community leaders claiming noble or royal lineage extending back to the Empire of Trebizond - had more than an intermediate-level knowledge of formal Demotic Greek and the more classicizing Katharevousa of the late Byzantine period. The majority were restricted to their own variant of Pontic Greek, which had a somewhat larger admixture of Turkish, Georgian, Russian, and Armenian vocabulary than the colloquial form of Greek used in Pontus proper. However, the Caucasus Greeks had had to become fluent Russian speakers, as a result of the schooling and education policies implemented by the Russian Imperial government, although at home and amongst themselves they continued to favour Greek. But Caucasus Greeks were still often conflated or confused with Russians in the Kars Oblast because of their use of Russian and worship alongside Russians in the same Orthodox churches as well as their generally Russianized and pro-Russian empire outlook. In fact, one quite popular but stereotyped way local 'Turks' might differentiate Caucasus Greeks from other Pontic Greeks was by stating that the former were "Greeks who had taken the Borshch [soup] from the Russians"!

The Caucasus Greeks had close social links with the Greek Orthodox Russian settlers of the Kars Oblast through worshiping in each other's churches as well as marrying partners of Russian Caucasus origin. These links were closer than those with either non-Orthodox Armenians or Orthodox Georgians, primarily because most of the former were not in communion with the Ecumenical Patriarchate of Constantinople while many of the latter were becoming increasingly attracted to Georgian nationalism. However, contacts and intermarriage between Caucasus Greeks and Armenians who were members of the Greek Orthodox church was fairly common, and to a lesser extent also existed between Caucasus Greeks and other Greek Orthodox communities of the South Caucasus, such as Georgians or Ossetians. Since many of the Turkish, Kurdish, and Indigenous Laz-speaking Muslims from the Kars region had fled westwards into Ottoman territory during and after the 1877-78 war, many other non-Orthodox Christian communities were also resettled there by the Russian administration. These included Russian religious minorities considered "heretical" by the Russian Orthodox Church, such as Dukhobors and Molokans, who as pacifists did not perform Russian military service and so unlike the Caucasus Greeks, Georgians, and Armenians did not play a significant role in the wars against the Ottomans. Even smaller numbers of Caucasus Germans, Estonians, Poles, and Lithuanians, were settled in the Kars Oblast, despite none of these communities having any significant historic or cultural links with the Transcaucasus and Eastern Anatolia, in contrast to the long-standing links Pontic Greeks had always had with the region.

== Contemporary (post-World War I) ==
During World War I most able-bodied Caucasus Greek men again fought for Russia against the Ottoman Empire, usually serving in the Russian Caucasus Army, which was led by a coterie of senior Russian, Georgian, and Armenian officers. In the final stages of the war, a Greek Caucasus Division was even established by bringing together Caucasus Greeks from different regiments of the Russian army in the South Caucasus, and whose primary purpose was to help defend ethnic Greek villages in the Kars, Erzerum, and Erzincan regions.

Most Caucasus Greeks left Kars Oblast following the cession of the area back to the Ottoman Empire in 1917, but before the official population exchange between Greece and Turkey in 1922-23. They mainly settled in villages in Greek Macedonia previously inhabited by Ottoman Muslims, and again generally preferred those situated on grassy plateaux or mountain districts, since these most closely resembled their former home in the South Caucasus. However, like many other Greeks of Pontus and north-eastern Anatolia, significant numbers of Caucasus Greeks who wanted to remain in what was now Turkish territory at any cost chose to convert to Islam and adopt the Turkish language for public purposes so as to be exempted from the population exchange. According to the terms of the population exchange protocol (which was essentially an appendage to the Treaty of Lausanne) the categories 'Greek' and 'Turk' were defined by religious affiliation rather than ethnicity, resulting in large numbers of Greek Muslims from Macedonia and Crete being categorized as 'Turkish in soul' and so resettled in the Turkish Aegean and parts of Anatolia. Those Caucasus Greeks who had remained in north-eastern Anatolia, like the many other Pontic Greeks who had also converted to Islam and adopted the Turkish language, subsequently became assimilated into the wider Turkish-Muslim population of the provinces of Trabzon, Sivas, Erzurum, Erzinjan, Kars, and Ardahan. However, after 1917 many Caucasus Greeks from Kars Oblast, and in particular those who had close Russian family links through intermarriage, also resettled in parts of Southern Russia that already had pre-existing communities of Pontic Greeks descended from earlier waves of refugees from northeastern Anatolia. These Greeks were based mainly in Stavropol Krai, in the foothills of the North Caucasus, where they still make up a significant element of the population (often up to 10%) in both urban and rural areas. They became fully assimilated into modern Russian life and society, although following the dissolution of the Soviet Union they substantially increased their links with Greece – and particularly with northern Greece – through work, trade, or study in their "mother" country and through taking up Greek nationality alongside their Russian one.

== Caucasus Greeks in contemporary Greek Macedonia ==
Most of the Caucasus Greeks of Kars Oblast who had not sided with the Bolsheviks subsequently left for Greece in 1919, before the province was officially re-incorporated into the territory of the new Turkish Republic and the large-scale Greek-Turkish population exchange of 1922-23. Most were resettled in Kilkis province and other parts of central and eastern Greek Macedonia, particularly in villages of the mountainous Drama prefecture that until 1922 had been inhabited largely by "Turks" (in this case Ottoman Muslims of mainly Bulgarian and Greek Macedonian convert origin). During the German occupation of Greece (1940–44) and Greek Civil War of 1943-49 most Caucasus Greek men fought for ELAS, the military wing of EAM, the leading Greek communist guerrilla organisation that fought against the German occupation. Many in Greece argue that the strong communist affiliations of Greek Macedonia's Pontic Greeks and Caucasus Greeks, most of whom even today continue to support the Greek Communist Party KKE, has never had anything to do with ideology but was actually due to residual pro-Russian sentiment and traditional family expectations, despite the fact that many had grandparents who had not remained in Russian territory precisely because they had not sided with the Bolsheviks.

The communist affiliations of most Caucasus Greeks has also been cited to account for why they often play down or even conceal any previous involvement their ancestors may have had in the Tsarist army or administration during the Russian occupation of the Transcaucasus region. For those communist Caucasus Greeks who, following the 1946-49 Greek Civil War, settled as refugees in the Eastern Bloc, particularly the USSR and Czechoslovakia, playing down or concealing their community's previous links with the Russian Empire was an essential tactic to ensure a safe, secure, and flourishing life in a communist state and society. One example of a high-ranking Caucasus Greek from Kars Oblast who spent much of his life fighting and propagandizing against Soviet communism, after having fought against the Bolsheviks with the forces of the White movement, was Constantine Kromiadi.

Caucasus Greeks have generally assimilated well into modern Greek society, being successful within a broad range of trades and professions. They are generally conflated by other Greeks with the Pontic Greeks of Pontus proper, whom many in Greece see as very socially conservative, clan-like, and inward-looking. Otherwise, Caucasus Greeks are often inaccurately described by other Greeks as 'Russo-Pontic [Greeks]' and sometimes even confused with the many ethnic Greeks who came from Georgia and southern Russia in the mid-90s, particularly since they often live in the same parts of Thessaloniki, share a similar Pontic Greek dialect, and tend to have surnames ending in '-dis' (from the Ancient Greek for 'the sons of ... '). However, it is generally the ethnic Greeks who came to Greek Macedonia from Georgia and southern Russia in the mid-1990s rather than the Caucasus Greeks who came shortly after 1919 that other Greeks often accuse of among other things being involved in organised crime in northern Greece and the wider Balkans and creating a kind of parallel, underground society.

The Caucasus Greeks and Pontic Greeks in general who settled in northern Greece between 1919 and 1923 have, on the other hand, had a lot more time to assimilate into contemporary Greek society than the more recent arrivals from Georgia and southern Russia, and as a consequence have a far better command of standard Modern Greek and awareness of mainstream Greek culture. The Caucasus Greeks and Pontic Greeks of Greek Macedonia have still managed to preserve some of their unique traditions and have also established many cultural and civil society organisations. The aspect of Pontic Greek culture most apparent to the outside observer is their traditional food, costume, music, and dance, with those of the Caucasus Greeks reflecting heavier Russian, Georgian, and Armenian influences. For example, the traditional costume of Caucasus Greek women resembles that of southern Russian women, while the men's costume is light grey, in contrast to the black attire worn by Greek men from Pontus proper, which they share with the Muslim Laz of the eastern Pontic Alps.

== See also ==
- Greeks in Armenia
- Greeks in Azerbaijan
- Greeks in Georgia
- Greeks in Russia and Ukraine

== Bibliography ==
- Acherson, Neal, 'Black Sea' (Jonathan Cape, London, 1995).
- Anderson, A. M., 'The Eastern Question' (1967).
- Browning, Robert, 'The Byzantine Empire' (1980).
- Caucasus Calendar, 1912 (British Government War Office Publication, 1914).
- Coene, Frederik, 'The Caucasus - An Introduction', (2011)
- Drury, Ian, The Russo-Turkish War of 1877 (1994).
- Eloyeva, FA, 'Ethnic Greek Group of Tsalka and Tetritskaro (Georgia)', Amsterdam Studies in the Theory and Practice of Linguistic (1994).
- Gocha, R. Tsetskhladze 'Greek Colonization of the Eastern Black Sea Littoral (Colchis)',(1992).
- Koromela, Marianna and Evert, Lisa,'Pontos-Anatolia : northern Asia Minor and the Anatolian plateau east of the upper Euphrates : images of a Journey', (1989).
- Mikhailidis, Christos & Athanasiadis, Andreas, 'A Generation in the Russian Caucasus'- in Greek, Γεννηθείς εις Καύκασον Ρωσίας (Inthognomon, 2007).
- Morison, John, Ethnic and National Issues in Russian and East European History (Selected Papers from the Fifth World Congress, 2000)
- Papadopoulos, Stephanos, 'Black Sea' (Kastaniotis Publications, 2012).
- Soteriou, Dido, 'Farewell Anatolia' (Kedros, 1996).
- Topalidis, Sam, 'A Pontic Greek History' (2006).
- Woodhouse, C. M. 'The Struggle for Greece, 1941-1949' (1984).
- Xanthopoulou-Kyriakou, Artemis, 'The Diaspora of the Greeks of the Pontos: Historical Background', Journal of Refugee Studies, 4, (1991).
- (article on migration of Pontic Greeks from Russian South Caucasus to Greek Macedonia, between 1897 and 1919)
- http://www.academia.edu/4067183/ANTON_POPOV_From_Pindos_to_Pontos_the_Ethnicity_and_Diversity_of_Greek_Communities_in_Southern_Russia
