= Gedik, Göle =

Gedik
- Village
- Location within Turkey
- Coordinates: 40.7038°N 42.6724°E
- Country: Turkey
- Province: Ardahan
- District: Göle
- Population (2021): 355
- Time zone: UTC+3 (TRT)

Gedik is a village in the Göle District, Ardahan Province, Turkey. Its population is 355 (2021).
