= Günorta =

Village in Ardahan Province, Turkey

- Village
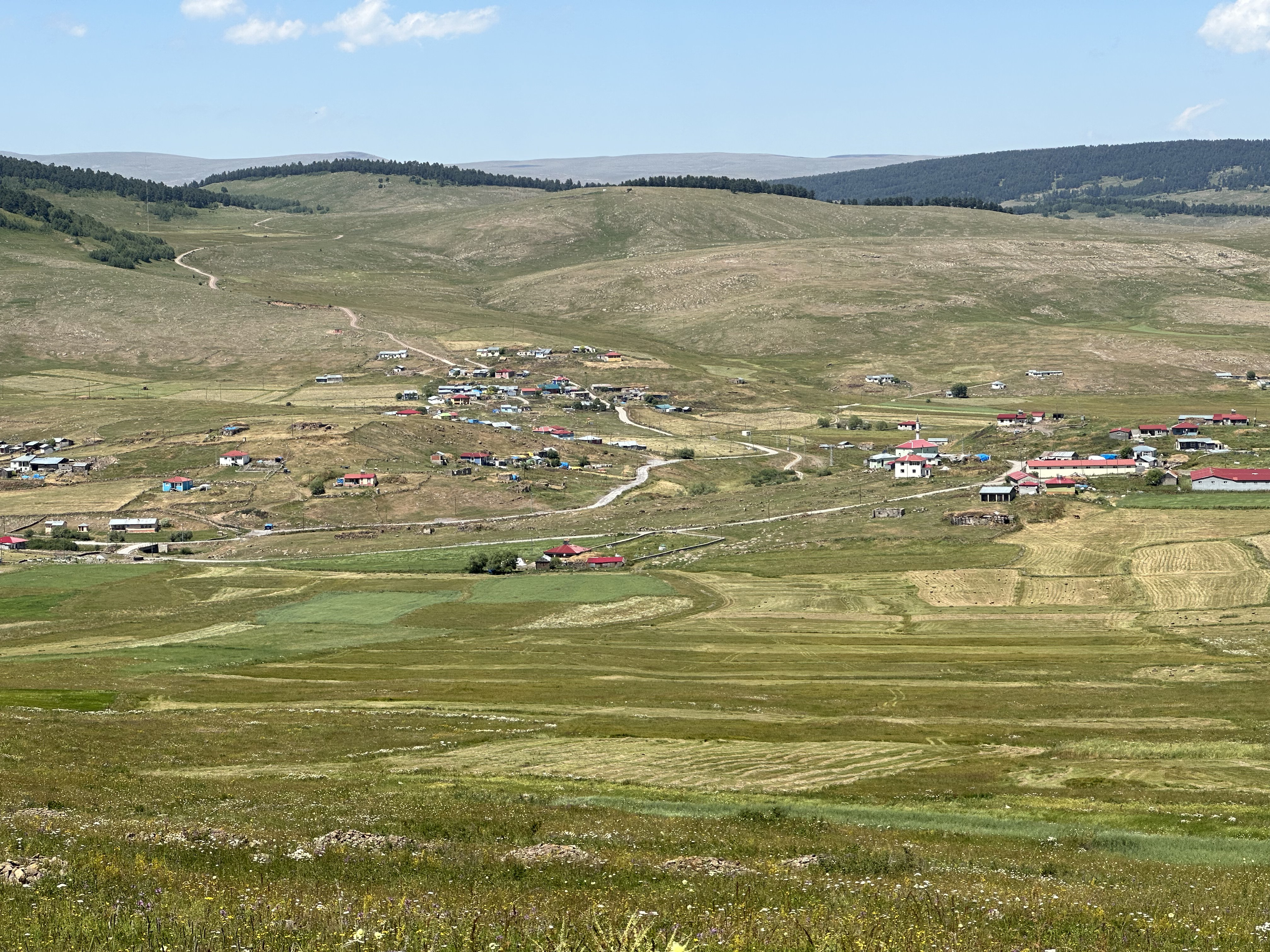

- Location within Turkey
- Coordinates: 40°53′N 42°25′E
- Country: Turkey
- Province: Ardahan
- District: Göle
- Population (2021): 150
- Time zone: UTC+3 (TRT)

Günorta is a village in the Göle District, Ardahan Province, Turkey. The village is populated by Kurds and had a population of 150 in 2021.
