= Yanatlı =

Village in Ardahan Province, Turkey

- Village
- Location within Turkey
- Coordinates: 40°54′42″N 42°43′57″E
- Country: Turkey
- Province: Ardahan
- District: Göle
- Population (2021): 329
- Time zone: UTC+3 (TRT)

Yanatlı is a village in the Göle District, Ardahan Province, Turkey. The village is populated by Kurds and had a population of 329 in 2021.
