= Bellitepe, Göle =

Bellitepe
- Village
- Location within Turkey
- Coordinates: 40°55′N 42°33′E
- Country: Turkey
- Province: Ardahan
- District: Göle
- Population (2021): 126
- Time zone: UTC+3 (TRT)

Bellitepe is a village in the Göle District, Ardahan Province, Turkey. Its population is 126 (2021).
