= Esenyayla, Göle =

Esenyayla
- Village
- Location within Turkey
- Coordinates: 40°48′N 42°50′E
- Country: Turkey
- Province: Ardahan
- District: Göle
- Population (2021): 426
- Time zone: UTC+3 (TRT)

Esenyayla is a village in the Göle District, Ardahan Province, Turkey. Its population is 426 (2021).
