= Kalecik, Göle =

Village in Ardahan Province, Turkey

Kalecik
- Village
- Location in Turkey
- Coordinates: 40°58′47″N 42°28′51″E
- Country: Turkey
- Province: Ardahan
- District: Göle
- Population (2021): 251
- Time zone: UTC+3 (TRT)

Kalecik is a village in the Göle District, Ardahan Province, Turkey. The village is populated by Kurds of the Canbeg tribe and had a population of 251 in 2021.
