= Mollahasan, Göle =

Village in Ardahan Province, Turkey

Mollahasan
- Village
- Location within Turkey
- Coordinates: 40.8885°N 42.8077°E
- Country: Turkey
- Province: Ardahan
- District: Göle
- Elevation: 2,044 m (6,706 ft)
- Population (2021): 330
- Time zone: UTC+3 (TRT)
- Postal code: 75700
- Area code: 0478

Mollahasan is a village in the Göle District, Ardahan Province, Turkey. The village is populated by Kurds and had a population of 330 in 2021.

It is close to the border with Armenia. The village is located 66 km from the Ardahan city center and 23 km from the Göle town center. There is no primary school in this village.

== Population ==
Historical population
Year	Pop.	±% p.a.
1985	957	—
1990	914	−0.92%
1997	614	−5.52%
2007	497	−2.09%
2012	442	−2.32%
2017	364	−3.81%
2021	330	−2.42%
Source: Population censuses (1985-1997) and TÜIK (2007-2021)
