= Küçükaltınbulak, Göle =

Village in Ardahan Province, Turkey

Küçükaltınbulak
- Village
- Location within Turkey
- Coordinates: 40°48′N 42°48′E
- Country: Turkey
- Province: Ardahan
- District: Göle
- Population (2021): 782
- Time zone: UTC+3 (TRT)

Küçükaltınbulak is a village in the Göle District, Ardahan Province, Turkey. The village is populated by Kurds and had a population of 782 in 2021.
