= Hoşdülbent, Göle =

Village in Ardahan Province, Turkey

Hoşdülbent
- Village
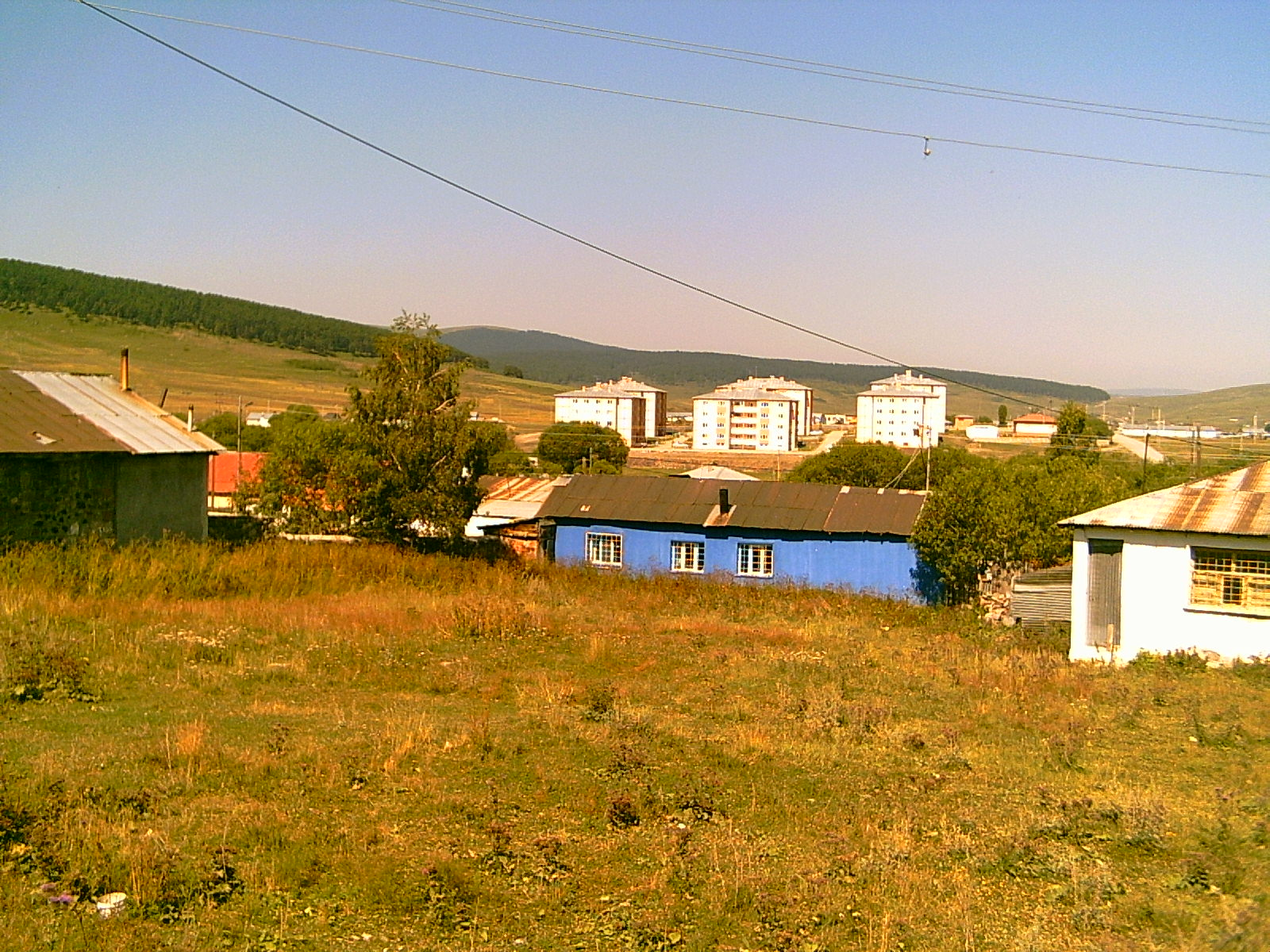

- Location within Turkey
- Coordinates: 40°51′N 42°41′E
- Country: Turkey
- Province: Ardahan
- District: Göle
- Population (2021): 185
- Time zone: UTC+3 (TRT)

Hoşdülbent is a village in the Göle District, Ardahan Province, Turkey. The village is populated by Kurds and had a population of 185 in 2021.
