= Balçeşme, Göle =

Village in Ardahan Province, Turkey

Balçeşme
- Village
- Location within Turkey
- Coordinates: 40°50′N 42°50′E
- Country: Turkey
- Province: Ardahan
- District: Göle
- Population (2021): 530
- Time zone: UTC+3 (TRT)

Balçeşme is a village in the Göle District, Ardahan Province, Turkey. The village is populated by Kurds and had a population of 530 in 2021.
