= Büyükaltınbulak, Göle =

Büyükaltınbulak
- Village
- Location within Turkey
- Coordinates: 40°49′N 42°43′E
- Country: Turkey
- Province: Ardahan
- District: Göle
- Population (2021): 267
- Time zone: UTC+3 (TRT)

Büyükaltınbulak is a village in the Göle District, Ardahan Province, Turkey. The village is populated by Kurds and had a population of 267 in 2021.
