= Fenerbahçe S.K. 4–0 Konyaspor (2023) =

Football match in Turkey

On the 25 February 2023, a football match of the Turkish Süper Lig between Fenerbahçe and Konyaspor took place in the Şükrü Saracoğlu Stadium in Istanbul, Turkey. The match ended in a 4–0 victory for Fenerbahce and during the match, fans chanted slogans against the Turkish Government demanding it to resign. Enner Valencia scored two goals in a match in which Konyaspor had to play with 10 players after Mame Biram Diouf was shown the red card in minute 22 in the first half.

== Background ==
It was the first game after the devastating earthquake of the 6 February 2023 which rocked southeast Turkey for both teams. Both teams also played their last games on the 2 February 2023. Fenerbahce Fenerbahce played a 1–1 draw against Adana Demirspor, while Konya lost to Istanbulspor 0–1. Fenerbahce counts as one of the three prominent football clubs from Turkey.

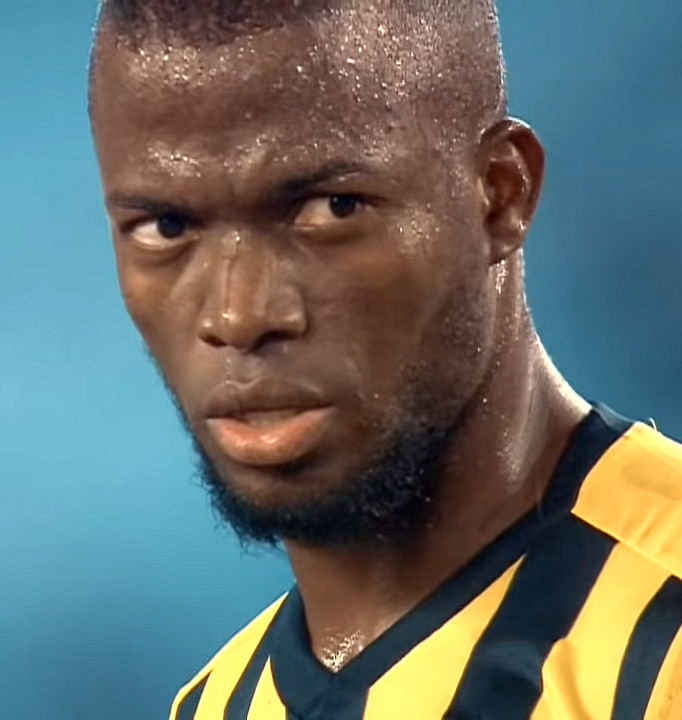
Enner Valencia scored two goals in the match

== Match ==
The football game began with a forward drive towards the goal of Konyaspor, which in the 12. minute was only able being stopped by the hand of Endri Çekiçi from Konyaspor. This then led to a foul penalty which was claimed by Enner Valencia who scored a goal. In the 22 Minute of the first half Mame Biram Diouf received a red card for elbowing after he had also received a yellow card in the 12. Minute. Valencia then scored his second goal for Fenerbahçe and it was 2–0 at the match break. In the second half, the guests from Konya were initially more offensive but their drive was stopped by the goal of Lincoln in the 62. Minute, which left the score at 3–0. In the 78. minute Attila Szalai scored the fourth goal for Fenerbahce with a header following a free-kick by Miguel Crespo.

== Anti–Government protests ==
During the match, the crowds were heard to demand the resignation of the Turkish government for their lack of response in the aftermath of the earthquake on the 6 February 2023. Recep Tayyip Erdogan, the Turkish president is a well known fan of the Fenerbahçe Football Club. The sports channel BeIN attempted to mute the slogans out from its broadcast, but on social media, the protests were widely shared. The Turkish Union of Clubs of the Süper Lig announced that football is not a political institution and wished for their clubs to be known for their involvement in football. Rizespor from the hometown of Erdogan though deemed the slogans "cries of septic rats" and several other football clubs supported the Governments response to the earthquake.

For the upcoming match between Kayserispor and Fenerbahçe on the 4 March 2023 in Kayseri, the Kayseri Provincial National Security Council decided on Tuesday that Fenerbahçe fans were banned from assisting the game, a step which was strongly condemned by Fenerbahçe. Fenerbahçe declared it would not accept such a decision and advocated for further clarification. A court then lifted the ban from the Fenerbahce fans.

== See also ==
Beşiktaş J.K. – Antalyaspor match of 2023
