= Çalıdere, Göle =

Village in Ardahan Province, Turkey

Çalıdere
- Village
- Location within Turkey
- Coordinates: 40.7487°N 42.6465°E
- Country: Turkey
- Province: Ardahan
- District: Göle
- Population (2021): 423
- Time zone: UTC+3 (TRT)

Çalıdere is a village in the Göle District, Ardahan Province, Turkey. The village is populated by Kurds and had a population of 423 in 2021.
