= Aquifer thermal energy storage =

Management of thermal energy in subsurface aquifers

Aquifer thermal energy storage (ATES) is the storage and recovery of thermal energy in subsurface aquifers. ATES can heat and cool buildings. Storage and recovery is achieved by extraction and injection of groundwater using wells. Systems commonly operate in seasonal modes. Groundwater that is extracted in summer performs cooling by transferring heat from the building to the water by means of a heat exchanger. The heated groundwater is reinjected into the aquifer, which stores the heated water. In wintertime, the flow is reversed — heated groundwater is extracted (often fed to a heat pump).

An ATES system uses the aquifer to buffer seasonal reversals in heating and cooling demand. ATES can serve as a cost-effective technology to replace fossil fuel-dependent systems and associated CO_{2} emissions.

ATES can contribute significantly to emission reductions, as buildings consume some 40% of global energy, mainly for heating and cooling. The number of ATES systems has increased dramatically, especially in Europe. Belgium, Germany, Turkey, and Sweden are also increasing the application of ATES. ATES can be applied wherever the climatic conditions and geohydrological conditions are appropriate. Optimisation of subsurface space requires attention in areas with suitable conditions.

== System types ==
Bidirectional ATES systems consist of two wells (a doublet). One well is used for heat storage, and the other for cold storage. During winter, (warm) groundwater is extracted from the heat storage well and injected in the cold storage well. During summer, the flow direction is reversed such that (cold) groundwater is extracted from the cold storage well and injected in the heat storage well.

Mono-directional systems do not switch pumping direction, such that groundwater is always extracted at the natural aquifer temperature. Although thermal energy is stored in the subsurface, there is usually no intention to retrieve the stored energy.

Closed systems store energy by circulating a fluid through a buried heat exchanger that usually consists of a horizontal or vertical pipeline. These systems do not extract or inject groundwater. They are also known as borehole thermal energy storage or ground source heat pumps.

Geothermal energy production commonly uses the deeper subsurface where temperatures are higher.

== History ==
The first reported deliberate storage of thermal energy in aquifers was in China around 1960. The first ATES systems were built for industrial cooling in Shanghai. There, large amounts of groundwater were extracted to cool textile factories. This led to substantial land subsidence. To inhibit the subsidence, cold surface water was reinjected into the aquifer. Subsequently, it was observed that the stored water remained cold after injection and could be used for cooling. Storage of thermal energy in aquifers was suggested in the 1970s which led to field experiments and feasibility studies in France, Switzerland, US and Japan.

ATES was used as part of enhanced bioremediation in the Netherlands in 2009.

As of 2018, more than 2800 ATES systems were in operation, providing more than 2.5 TWh of heating and cooling per year. The Netherlands and Sweden dominated the market. 85% of all systems were then located in the Netherlands, while a further 10% were found in Sweden, Denmark, and Belgium.

== Typical dimensions ==
Flow rates for typical applications are between 20 and 150 m^{3}/hour/well. The volume of groundwater that is stored and recovered in a year generally varies between 10 000 m^{3} and 150 000 m^{3} per well. ATES system depths is commonly between 20 and 200 meters. Temperature at these depths is generally close to the annual mean surface temperature. In moderate climates this is around 10 °C. In those regions cold storage is commonly applied between 5 and 10 °C and heat storage in the range 10 to 20 °C. Although less frequent, some projects store heat above 80 °C.

== Hydrogeological constraints ==
Energy savings that can be achieved with ATES depend strongly on site geology. ATES requires the presence of a suitable aquifer that is able to accept and yield water. For example solid rock limits access to the aquifer. Thick (>10 m) sandy aquifers are optimal. Sufficient hydraulic conductivity is required, enough that water flows easily. However, excess groundwater flow may transport (part of) the stored energy outside of a well's capture zone during the storage phase. To reduce advective heat loss, aquifers with a low hydraulic gradient are preferred. In addition, gradients in geochemical composition should be avoided, as mixing of water with heterogeneous geochemistry can increase clogging, which reduces performance and increases maintenance costs.

== Legal status ==
Shallow (<400 m) geothermal installations' legal status is diverse among countries. Regulations for installations concern the use of hazardous materials and proper backfilling of the borehole to avoid hydraulic short circuiting between aquifers. Other regulations concern protection of groundwater areas for potable water. Some countries limit minimum and maximum storage temperatures. For example, Austria (5–20 °C), Denmark (2–25 °C) and Netherlands (5–25 °C). Other countries adopt a maximum change in groundwater temperature, for example Switzerland (3 °C) and France (11 °C).

== Contaminated groundwater ==
ATES is not allowed to process contaminated aquifers, due to the possible spreading of groundwater contamination, especially in urban areas. The possibility of contamination encounter is however rising, because of the rapid increase of the number of ATES and slow progress of contaminated groundwater remediation in urban areas. Among the common contaminants, chlorinated ethenes have the most chance to interfere with ATES systems, as they are often found at similar depths. When chlorinated ethenes present as dense non-aqueous phase liquid (DNAPLs), the possible dissolution of DNAPLs by ATES will increase the impact on groundwater quality.

=== Possible application ===
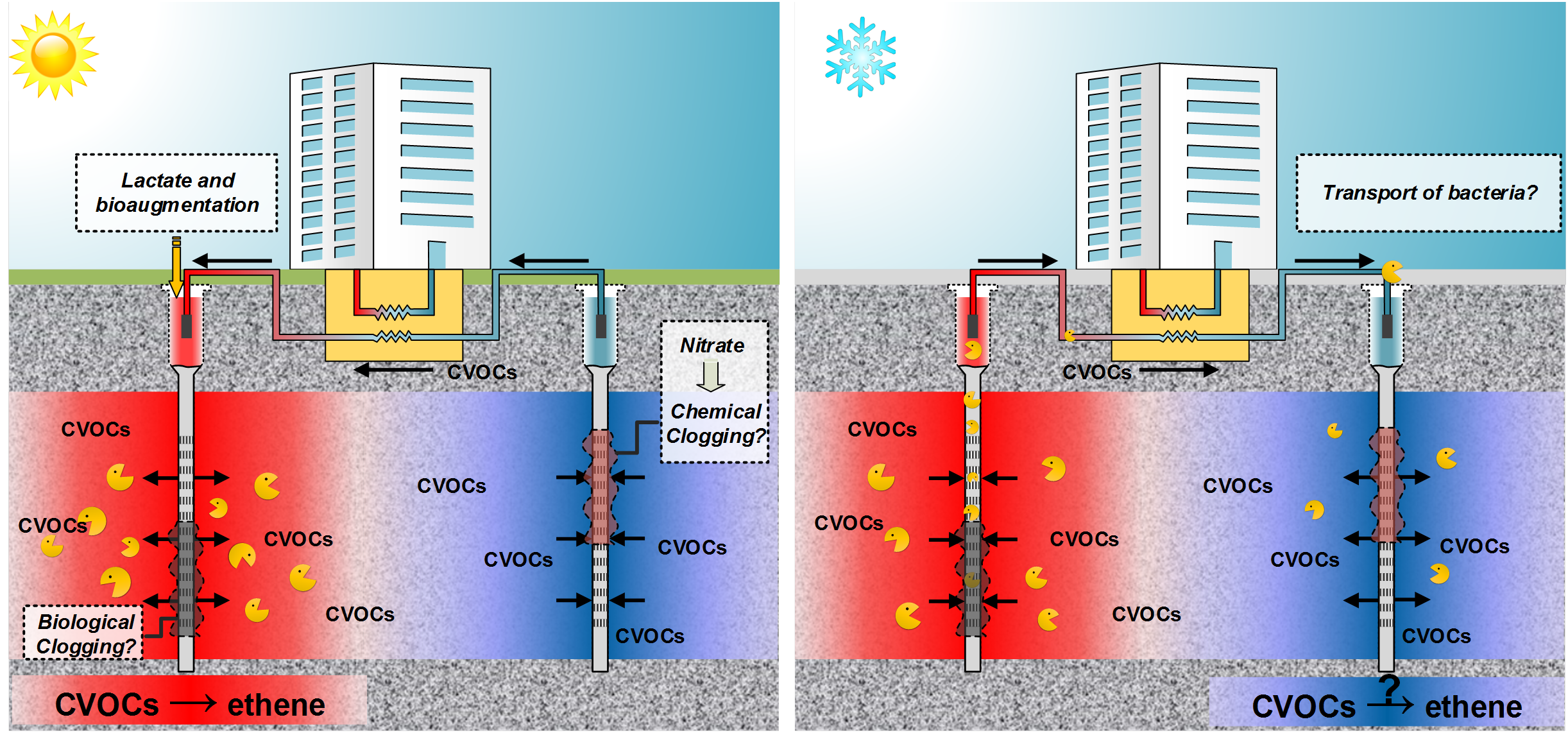
Illustration of relevant processes in the ATES-ENA system.

The presence of ATES and chlorinated ethenes offers the potential for of integration of sustainable energy technology and sustainable groundwater management. Increased temperature around the warm well can enhance reductive dechlorination of chlorinated ethenes. Although low temperature in cold well can hamper biodegradation, seasonal operation of ATES can transfer contaminant from cold well to hot well for faster remediation. Such seasonal groundwater transport can homogenize the environmental condition.

ATES can be used as biostimulation, for example to inject electron donor or microorganisms needed for reductive dechlorination.

The lifespan of ATES (30 years) fits the required duration of in situ bioremediation.

== Societal impacts ==
The combination concept of ATES and enhanced natural attenuation (ATES-ENA) can possibly be used in the Netherlands and China, especially in urbanized areas. These areas are confronted with organic groundwater contamination. Currently, the combination concept may be better applicable for the Netherlands which offers more mature technology and greater experience. However, for China where ATES is much less developed, demonstration pilot projects can be evaluated prior to production applications, and flexible systems can be developed because of the less intense pressure on subsurface use by ATES.

A 2023 study reported that ATES could reduce the use of energy in heating and cooling US homes and businesses by 40 percent.
