= İsmail Ateş =

Turkish artist and professor

- Website: www.ismailates.com

İsmail Ateş (pronounced /ˌɪsˈmɑːɪl ˌɑtɛʃ/, born Göle, Ardahan Province, Turkey; 1960) is a Turkish artist and professor.

He graduated from Faculty of Education in Art, Painting Department of Gazi University in 1982. In 1988, he received his "Master of Fine Arts" degree at Hacettepe University, then, in 1993, received his "Doctor of Philosophy" degree under the title of "The Relation Between Form, Texture and Geometric Surfaces as an Element in Painting" at the same institution.

İsmail Ateş, who has had many exhibitions in Turkey and abroad, did research on "American Art" and "Art Training" in the Department of Art at the City University of New York, Hunter College between 2002–2004 and he is currently teaching at Hacettepe University's Faculty of Fine Arts.

In paintings of İsmail Ateş, the geometries which explain space, get an organic quality with soft movements of colors. Continual color and ton transformations now present time and space continuity, as Bergson says, the existence of entity with its whole past, the endless variations and transformations of colors, to entirety and continuity of perception. In all sensation parameters, color, is the most connected with sensations and spirituel situations, the most boundless and independent sensorial form. In paintings of İsmail Ateş, color, with a geometric genre, gets a top-level mental quality. In a sense, this paintings evoke, transformation of the paintings of Kandinsky into mental symbols more than being sensational.

Some of his paintings are in various museums and private collections which can be indicated as Ankara Art Museum, Ministry of Culture Art Collection, PTT Museum Collection, General Directorate of Youth and Sports Collection, General Directorate of TPAO Collection, Central Bank Collection, Hacettepe University Collection, Istanbul Ciragan Palace Collection, Hacettepe Art Museum, METU Art Collection, Ankara University Art Collection, Şefik Bursalı Museum, New York United Nations Plaza and other private and local collections around Turkey and the world primarily in Amsterdam, Maastricht and New York.

== Solo exhibitions ==
- 1983 Dost Art Gallery, Ankara
- 1984 Ankara Art Association, Ankara
- 1988 Hacettepe University Faculty of Fine Arts Studio, Ankara
- 1991 İlayda Art Gallery, Ankara
- 1992 Painting and Sculpture Museum, Ankara
- 1993 İş Bank Art Gallery, İzmir
- 1993 Hacettepe University Faculty of Fine Arts Studio, Ankara
- 1994 Talih Kuşu Art Gallery, Ankara
- 1994 Gallery Zon, Ankara
- 1995 Gallery Soyut, Ankara
- 1996 Gallery TMMO, Ankara
- 1997 Gallery Sanat Yapım, Ankara
- 1998 Gallery Soyut, Ankara
- 1999 Gallery Soyut, Ankara
- 2001 Gallery Baraz, İstanbul
- 2001 Gallery İlayda, Ankara
- 2001 Gallery Soyut, Ankara
- 2002 Gallery Artist, İstanbul
- 2002 Gallery Toyan, Ankara
- 2002 Gallery Akdeniz, Ankara
- 2004 United Nations Plaza, New York
- 2005 ArtSumer Modern Art Gallery, İstanbul
- 2006 Atlas Art Gallery, Ankara
- 2006 Gallery dem-art, İstanbul
- 2007 METU Convention and Culture Center, Ankara
- 2009 Gallery Beşiktaş, İstanbul
- 2010 Gözübüyük Art House, Ankara
- 2012 Turkish Center, New York
- 2015 Sefaköy Culture and Art Center, İstanbul
- 2015 Ofis Art Center, Sakarya
- 2015 Yunus Emre Culture Center, İstanbul

== Awards ==
- 1986 Encouragement Prize, Gallery Mi-Ge Painting Competition
- 1988 Accomplishment Award, General Directorate of Physical Art Training
- 1988 Accomplishment Award, 49th State Exhibition
- 1989 1st Prize, Zonguldak Painting Competition
- 1990 Painting Award, Anniversary of PTT Art Competition
- 1990 9th TPAO Painting Competition, Prize of Honor
- 1990 First Prize, Ahi Evran Painting Competition
- 1991 Honourable Mention, 2nd Ahi Evran Painting Competition
- 1992 First Prize, State Exhibition
- 1992 Award, Sincan Festival Painting Competition
- 1992 Success and Appreciation in Art Prize, Senate of Hacettepe University
- 1993 Award, Senate of Hacettepe University
- 2007 Award, Şefik Bursalı Painting Exhibition
- 2010 Painting Award, 34th DYO Painting Competition
- 2014 Painting Award, 72nd State Exhibition
