= Durucasu, Göle =

Durucasu
- Village
- Location within Turkey
- Coordinates: 40.8321°N 42.7291°E
- Country: Turkey
- Province: Ardahan
- District: Göle
- Population (2021): 167
- Time zone: UTC+3 (TRT)

Durucasu is a village in the Göle District, Ardahan Province, Turkey. Its population is 167 (2021).
