= Budaklı, Göle =

Budaklı
- Village
- Location within Turkey
- Coordinates: 40.9570°N 42.5346°E
- Country: Turkey
- Province: Ardahan
- District: Göle
- Population (2021): 243
- Time zone: UTC+3 (TRT)

Budaklı is a village in the Göle District, Ardahan Province, Turkey. Its population is 243 (2021).

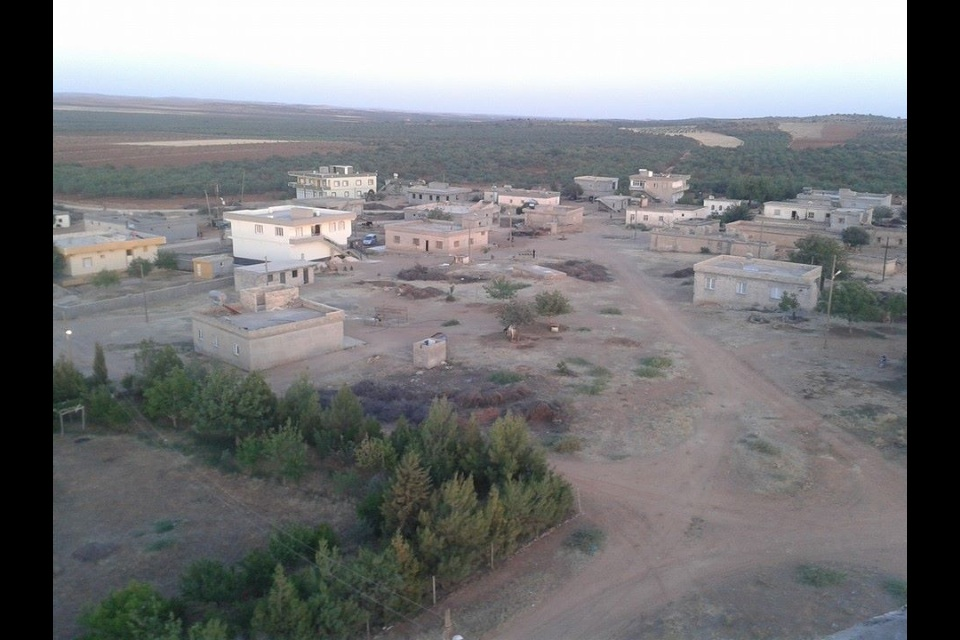
Budaklı
