= Göle District =

District of Ardahan Province, Turkey

- District
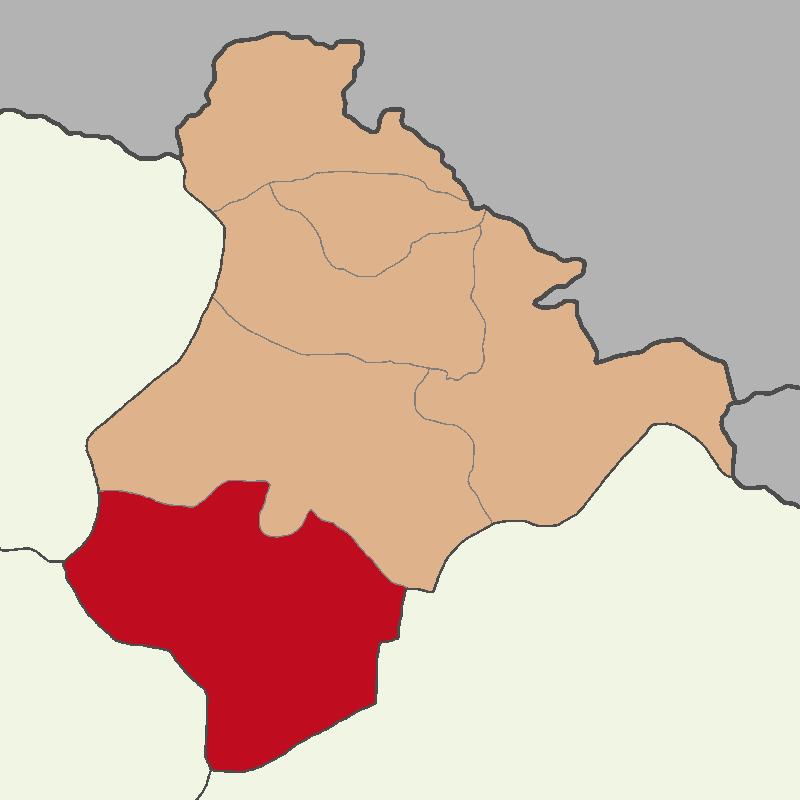
- Map showing Göle District in Ardahan Province

- Location in Turkey
- Coordinates: 40°48′N 42°37′E
- Country: Turkey
- Province: Ardahan
- Seat: Göle

Government
  - Kaymakam: Haluk Koç
- Area: 1,290 km^{2} (500 sq mi)
- Population (2021): 23,933
  - Density: 19/km^{2} (48/sq mi)
- Time zone: UTC+3 (TRT)
- Website: www.gole.gov.tr

Göle District is a district of Ardahan Province of Turkey. Its seat is the town Göle. Its area is 1,290 km^{2}, and its population is 23,933 (2021).

Göle is a rural district, eighty per cent of the area comprising mountain and forest, with the remainder grazing land and meadow; the local economy depends on this grazing. Göle is famous for its yellow kaşar cheese. Some crops are grown, including grains and potatoes. With the high Allahuekber Mountains to the south Göle is exposed to the north resulting in cold winters.

== Composition ==
There are two municipalities in Göle District:

- Göle
- Köprülü (Korehenk)

There are 49 villages in Göle District. The old names of the villages are noted after in parentheses.

- Arpaşen (Ağılylu)
- Balçeşme (Lalavargenis)
- Bellitepe (Urut)
- Budaklı (Cicor)
- Büyükaltınbulak
- Çakıldere (Orakilise)
- Çakırüzüm (Muzaret)
- Çalıdere (Mihgerek)
- Çardaklı
- Çayırbaşı (Hokam)
- Çobanköy
- Çullu
- Damlasu (Sasadel)
- Dedekılıcı (Kaşar)
- Dengeli (Abur)
- Dereyolu (Salot)
- Dölekçayır (Pilemor)
- Durucasu
- Esenboğaz (Kelpikor)
- Esenyayla
- Eskidemirkapı
- Filizli (Sivin)
- Gedik (Lavustan)
- Gülistan
- Günorta (Kızılkilise)
- Hoşdülbent
- Kalecik
- Karlıyazı (Kirziyan)
- Kayaaltı (Poladik)
- Koyunlu
- Küçükaltınbulak
- Kuytuca (Şekki)
- Mollahasan
- Okçu
- Samandöken (Sinot)
- Senemoğlu
- Serinçayır (Çölpenek)
- Sürügüden (Heve)
- Tahtakıran
- Tellioğlu
- Toptaş
- Uğurtaşı
- Yağmuroğlu
- Yanatlı (Varkenez/Varginis)
- Yavuzlar (Üçkilise)
- Yeleçli (Samzelek)
- Yenidemirkapı
- Yeniköy
- Yiğitkonağı (Türkeşen)
