= Imerkhevians =

Ethnographic subgroup of Georgians

Imerkhevians იმერხეველები
- Distribution of the Imerkhevian dialect

Languages
- Imerkhevian dialect of Georgian language

Related ethnic groups
- Adjarians and other groups of Kartvelians

Imerkhevians (Georgian: იმერხეველები, romanized: imerkhevelebi), are an ethnographic subgroup of Georgians who speak the Imerkhevian dialect (imerkheuli) of the Georgian language, which shares many common features with the neighboring Adjarian dialect. Imerkhevians are the indigenous population of Artvin Province, an historical region located in northeastern Turkey. The Imerkhevians are Sunni Muslims, closely integrated with the Turkish society. Almost all are bilingual in Georgian and Turkish.

Reflecting some internal differentiation persisting in Turkey's Georgian community, the Imerkhevians claim a different origin from the Georgians in the Borçka area, who have adopted an inclusive Adjar identity. The first who brought the local culture to a scholarly attention was Nicholas Marr, who, while on an expedition in Shavsheti in 1910, collected folk literature and ethnographic information from several villages along the Imerkhevi river.

== Geographical distribution ==
The majority of the Imerkhevians today live in an area they call Imerkhevi, the name of the cultural region traditionally inhabited by the Imerkhevian. The population of Imerkhevi is largely composed of ethnic Georgians, who inhabit 14 hamlets around Meydancık, formerly known as Diobani. These settlements have both official Turkish and unofficial Georgian names.

Country	Concentration
Turkey	Maden (Badzgireti), Demirci (Daba), Dereiçi (Dasamoba), Erikli (Agara), Çukur (Chikhori), Sebzeli (Jvariskhevi), Çağlayan (Khevtsvirili), Çağlıpınar (Khokhlevi), Yeşilce (Manatba), Oba (Ube), Dutlu (Surevani), Yağlı (Zakieti), Tepebaşı (Ziosi), and Çiçekli (Tsetileti).

== See also ==
- Adjarians
- Meskhetians
- Laz people
- Chveneburi
