= Imerkhevi =

Valley in Şavşat, Artvin, Turkey

- Turkish: İmerhev; Georgian: იმერხევი
- Location within Turkey Location within Adjara Location within Caucasus Mountains

Geography
- Country: Turkey
- Coordinates: 41°25′N 42°15′E
- Interactive map of Imerkhevi

Imerkhevi (Georgian: იმერხევი, Turkish: İmerhev) is a valley in the north of the Şavşat district in the Artvin Province of Turkey, along the border with Georgia. There are 15 villages in this area, inhabited by Imerkhevian Georgians, who speak a local dialect of the Georgian language.

== History ==
Imerkhevi was historically one of the subregions that made up Shavsheti, a medieval Georgian fiefdom on the upper course of the Imerkhevi or Berta river, east of Nigali, west of the Arsiani Range (Yalnızçam), and bounded by Adjara on the north. After these territories were conquered by the Ottoman Empire in the 16th century, Imerkhevi (İmerhev) became a sanjak and its people gradually converted to Islam. The territory was acquired by the Russian Empire through the Treaty of Berlin in 1878. Shavsheti and Imerkhevi were organized into the Shavsheto-Imerkhevsky circuit (uchastok) as part of the Batum Oblast. As of 1886, the circuit had a population of 18,319, of which 41.2% were Georgians, 51.3% Turkified Georgians, and 7.0% Armenians. Following the turmoil of World War I (1914–1918) and the short-lived independence of Georgia (1918–1921), Imerkhevi became a part of Turkey according to the territorial rearrangements in the 1921 treaties of Moscow and Kars.

== Population ==
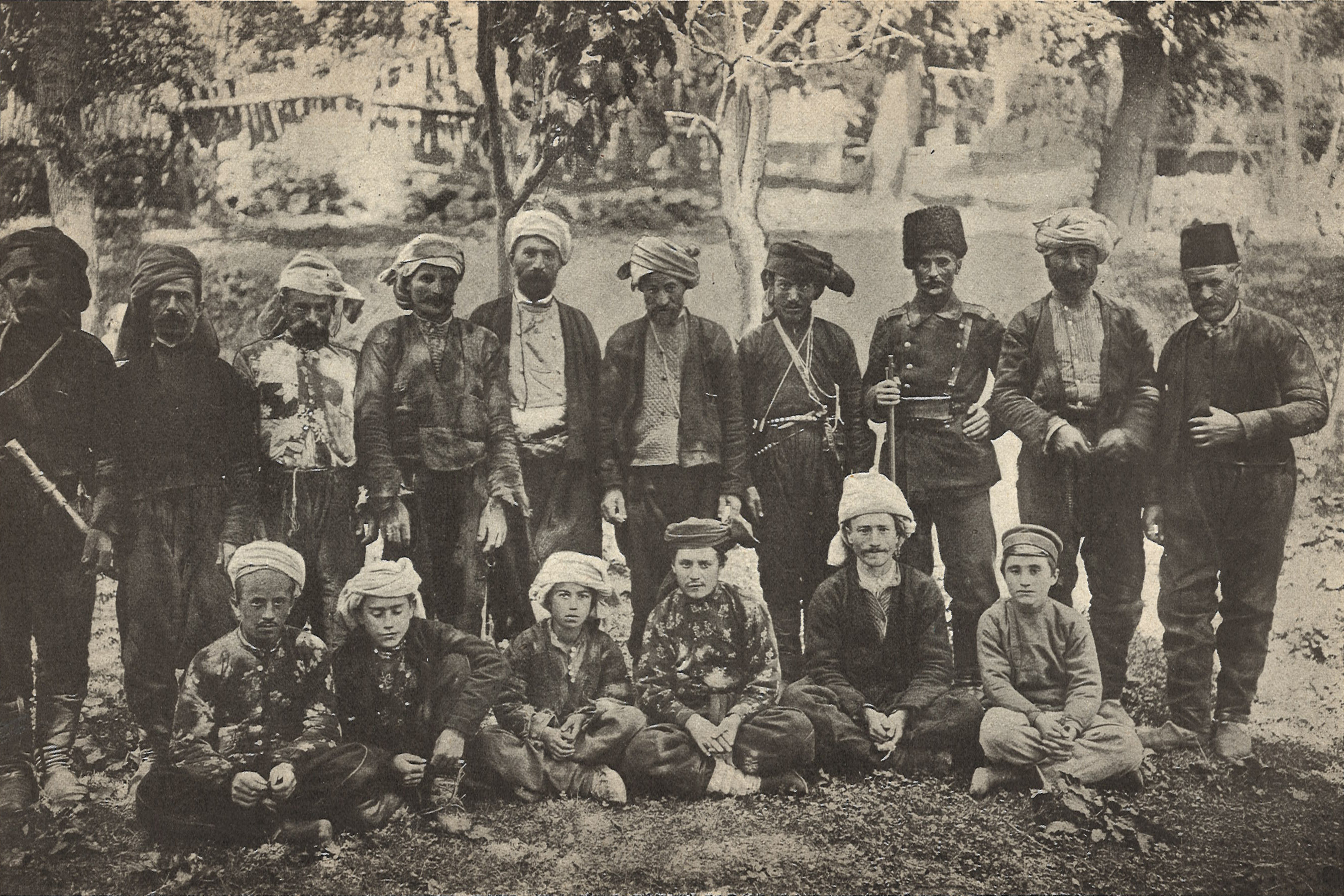
A group of Imerkhevians. A photo from N. Marr's travelogue, 1911

The population of Imerkhevi is largely composed of ethnic Georgians, who inhabit 14 hamlets around Meydancık, formerly known as Diobani. These settlements have both official Turkish and unofficial Georgian names. They are Balıklı (Tskalsimeri), Maden (Badzgireti), Demirci (Daba), Dereiçi (Dasamoba), Erikli (Agara), Çukur (Chikhori), Sebzeli (Jvariskhevi), Çağlayan (Khevtsvirili), Çağlıpınar (Khokhlevi), Yeşilce (Manatba), Oba (Ube), Dutlu (Surevani), Yağlı (Zakieti), Tepebaşı (Ziosi), and Çiçekli (Tsetileti).

The Imerkhevians are Sunni Muslims, closely integrated with the Turkish society. Almost all are bilingual in Georgian and Turkish. The Georgian dialect spoken in the area is known as Imerkhevian (imerkheuli) and shares many common features with the neighboring Adjarian. Reflecting some internal differentiation persisting in Turkey's Georgian community, the Imerkhevians claim a different origin from the Georgians in the Borçka area, who have adopted an inclusive Adjar identity. The first who brought the local culture to a scholarly attention was Nicholas Marr, who, while on an expedition in Shavsheti in 1910, collected folk literature and ethnographic information from several villages along the Imerkhevi river.

== See also ==
- Chveneburi
- Erusheti
- Machakheli
- Nigali valley
