= Kvakatsa =

Kvakatsa or Kvakatsi (Georgian: ქვაკაცა or ქვაკაცი), is a human figure carved into a rock or formed by stacking stones, symbolising a tradition and belief unique to Georgian culture. Kvakatsa or kvakatsi is composed of the Georgian words ‘kva’ (ქვა) and ‘katsi / katsa’ (კაცი / კაცა), meaning ‘man / human', the word ‘kvakatsa’ or 'kvakatsi' can be translated as ‘stone man’ or ‘rock man’.

In the regions of Tao-Klarjeti, Javakheti and Adjara, which are part of historical Georgia, such figures were found mainly in the highlands, in the plateaus, referred to as the Alpine zone. Kvakatsa were considered guiding signs. A type of stele formed by stacking stones resembled a human figure from a distance. It was also believed that Kvakatsa protected people from disasters and evil. It has recently been stated that there are two Kvakatsi in the highlands on the border of Khokhlevi and Chakvelta in the Şavşat District. Even today, Kvakatsa can be found in the highlands or high places of some villages in the Şavşat District, such as Bazgireti and Hevtzvrili. According to ancient tradition, even taking and throwing away one of the stones that formed the Kvakatsa was considered a sin. According to belief, the Kvakatsas controlled the weather and water. It is known that rituals were performed in front of the Kvakatsa for this purpose. This situation shows that the figures called Kvakatsa were considered sacred. It is thought that Kvakatsa was considered a deity and worshipped in the ancient belief system.

The word Kvakatsa has also been reflected in place names in historical Georgian geography. In the Georgian manuscript titled Meskhuri Davitnis Kronika (მესხური დავითნის ქრონიკა), the name ‘Kvakatsi’ (ქვაკაცი) or ‘Kvakatsa’ (ქვაკაცა) is mentioned. Indeed, two villages bearing this name are recorded in the Ottoman land-survey register (mufassal defter) dated 1595. One of these is the village of Kvakatsni or Kvakatsta in the district of Çıldır, whose name was later changed to Saymalı. In this register, this village belonged to the Canbaz subdistrict (nahiye) of the Çıldır province (liva). The other village bearing the same name was affiliated with the Kanarbili (ყანარბილი) subdistrict (nahiye) of the same province. It is understood that these place names originated in connection with the Kvakatsa figures erected here.
