= Muslim Georgians =

Muslim Georgians may refer to:

- Islam in Georgia (country), Muslims living in Georgia (country)
- Adjarians, Muslim ethnic Georgians indigenous to Adjara, Georgia
- Chveneburi, Muslim ethnic Georgians in Turkey descended from Muhacir refugees
- Imerkhevians, Muslim ethnic Georgians indigenous to Artvin, Turkey
- Ingiloy people, Muslim ethnic Georgians indigenous to Saingilo, Azerbaijan
- Iranian Georgians, Muslim ethnic Georgians living in Iran
- Islam in Georgia (U.S. state), Muslims living in Georgia (U.S. state)
