= Georgians in Turkey =

Ethnic group in Turkey

Georgians in Turkey Türkiye'deki Gürcüler
- Georgians in Constantinople, 1888

Total population
- Estimated 1,000,000–1,500,000

Regions with significant populations
- Black Sea Region, Marmara Region, Eastern Anatolia region

Languages
- Turkish, Georgian

Religion
- Predominantly Sunni Islam

Related ethnic groups
- Laz people

Georgians in Turkey (Georgian: ქართველები თურქეთში, romanized: kartvelebi turketshi) refers to citizens and denizens of Turkey who are, or descend from, ethnic Georgians. According to various studies, more than one million people in Turkey are of Georgian origin, although only a small proportion of them speak Georgian. Following the establishment of the Russian Empire's rule in Georgia and throughout the Soviet period, Georgian communities in Turkey had limited contact with their relatives in Georgia and had little access to information about them. Following the dissolution of the Soviet Union and the restoration of Georgia's independence, interest in Georgia and Georgian culture among Georgian communities in Turkey increased significantly.

== Numbers and distribution ==
Georgian-speaking population in Turkey
| Year | As first language | As second language | Total | Turkey's population | % of total speakers |
|---|---|---|---|---|---|
| 1935 | 57,325 | 16,255 | 73,580 | 16,157,450 | 0.46 |
| 1945 | 40,076 | 9,337 | 49,413 | 18,790,174 | 0.26 |
| 1950 | 72,604 | 0 | 72,604 | 20,947,188 | 0.35 |
| 1955 | 51,983 | 24,720 | 76,703 | 24,064,763 | 0.32 |
| 1960 | 32,944 | 54,941 | 87,885 | 27,754,820 | 0.32 |
| 1965 | 34,330 | 44,934 | 79,234 | 31,391,421 | 0.25 |

In the census of 1965, those who spoke Georgian as first language were proportionally most numerous in Artvin (3.7%), Ordu (0.9%) and Kocaeli (0.8%).

Georgians live scattered throughout Turkey, although they are primarily concentrated in two major regions:

- Black Sea Region: Provinces and districts located in the Black Sea Region, particularly Artvin, Ordu, Samsun, Giresun, Amasya, Sinop, and Tokat.
- Marmara Region: Provinces and districts in the Marmara Region and surrounding areas, particularly Sakarya, Bursa, Kocaeli, Düzce, Balıkesir, and Yalova.

According to 1922 data, Artvin Province had a population of 63,786, including 21,590 Georgians (Imerkhevians) and 11,453 Laz.

There are 420 villages in Turkey inhabited by descendants of Georgian muhajirs (Chveneburi), of which 280 are located in the Black Sea region and 140 in the Marmara region.

The total number of ethnic Georgians in Turkey is unknown, and estimates vary considerably among different sources. This is largely because only a small proportion of them speak their ancestral language, while ethnic affiliation is not recorded in the census.

=== Imerkhevians ===
Distribution of the Imerkhevian dialect

Imerkhevians (Shavshetians) are an ethnographic subgroup of Georgians who speak the Imerkhevian dialect (imerkheuli) of the Georgian language, which shares many features with the neighboring Adjarian dialect. Imerkhevians are the indigenous population of Artvin Province.

Today, most Imerkhevians live in Artvin Province, particularly in the region known as Imerkhevi. The population of Imerkhevi is predominantly composed of ethnic Georgians, with 14 villages and hamlets located around Meydancık (historically known as Diobani) traditionally regarded as part of the Imerkhevi region. These settlements have both official Turkish and traditional Georgian names. However, Imerkhevians are not limited to these settlements and are also found elsewhere in Artvin Province. Reflecting a degree of internal differentiation within Turkey's Georgian community, the Imerkhevians claim a distinct origin from the Georgians of the Borçka area, many of whom identify as Adjars. The Imerkhevians are Sunni Muslims and are closely integrated into Turkish society.

=== Chveneburi ===
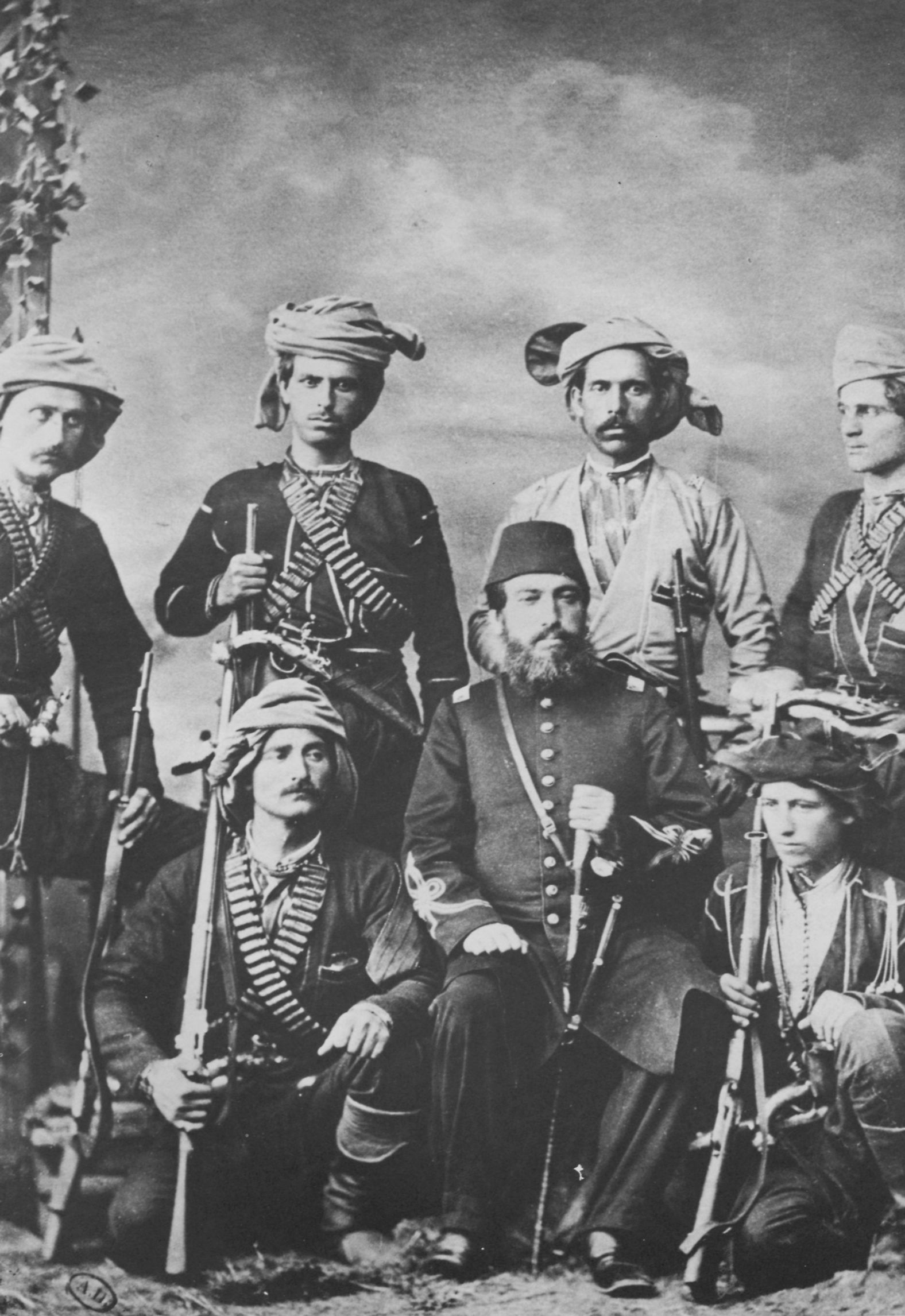
Ali Pasha of Çürüksu (front row, middle) and Ottoman Georgians during the Russo-Turkish War (1877–78). At the end of the war, the resettlement of Ottoman Georgians in Fatsa was supervised by Ali Pasha.

Chveneburi (Georgian: ჩვენებური, çveneburi), meaning "of us" in Georgian, is an endonym used by Georgian-descended Muslim immigrants who settled in regions of Turkey where Georgians did not constitute a majority. The term "of us" thus signifies a threefold distinction from Christian Georgians, Muslim Turks, and indigenous Muslim Georgians from Artvin. As with most Turkish citizens, most Chveneburi subscribe to the Hanafi madh'hab of Sunni Islam.

Chveneburi Georgians arrived in Turkey in three waves of migration, largely as a result of pogroms and other pressures associated with the Russian Empire. The first wave occurred during and after the 1828–1829 Russo-Turkish War, when the Sublime Porte ceded sovereignty over several parts of Georgia to the Russian Empire.

Smaller waves of immigration followed until the end of the 1877–1878 Russo-Turkish War, after which the Ottoman Empire allowed Chveneburis to immigrate. This wave of immigration involved at least 80,000 people from historic Georgian regions with considerable Muslim populations, such as Batumi, Kobuleti, Artvin, Shavsheti, Nigali, and Ardahan.

The last sizable wave of immigration took place in 1921, following the Soviet occupation of the Democratic Republic of Georgia, when Turkey finally relinquished its claims to Adjara under the Treaty of Kars with the Soviet republics. Subsequently, many Muslims from Upper Adjara migrated to Turkey. Adjarians were also known by their places of origin, such as Batumlular for people from Batumi and Çürüksulular for people from Kobuleti.

Overall, these three waves of migration resulted in up to 150,000 Georgian Muslims becoming muhajirs.

== Press ==
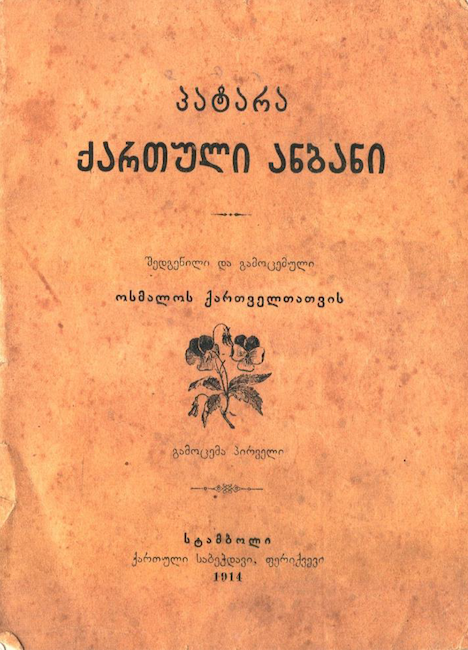
Patara Kartuli Anbani, 1914.

The most important Georgian cultural magazine in Turkey also bears the name Çveneburi. It was founded in 1977 in Stockholm, Sweden, by Shalva Tevzadze. It was distributed in Turkey by Ahmet Özkan Melashvili, who also wrote the book Gürcüstan (Georgia) in 1968. In 1980, Özkan was assassinated in Bursa by the Grey Wolves. Since then, Fahrettin Çiloğlu has been in charge of the magazine. Between 1997 and 2006, Osman Nuri Mercan was the editor of the magazine. The magazine's content is almost entirely in Turkish and presents articles on Chveneburi Georgians, the history of Georgia, and Georgians worldwide. Another journal, Pirosmani, bilingual in Georgian and Turkish, is published in Istanbul and sponsored by the Georgian Catholic Simon Zazadze.

== Education ==
In 2014, the Ministry of National Education adopted a Georgian-language curriculum within the framework of the "Living Languages and Dialects" course, making it possible for Georgian to be taught as an elective subject in the 5th, 6th, 7th, and 8th grades. Subsequently, Georgian-language classes were opened in schools affiliated with the Ministry of National Education in the provinces of Sakarya and Artvin. Prior to this initiative, Georgian had been taught only at the course level by various associations and foundations. In addition, Georgian is offered at the higher-education level in Turkey under the title Georgian Language and Literature, with undergraduate degree programs available at four universities.

== See also ==
- Georgia–Turkey relations
- Our Lady of Lourdes Church, Istanbul
- Islam in Georgia
- Adjarians
- Pontic Greeks
- Hamshenis
- Iranian Georgians

== Bibliography ==
- Öztürk, Özhan (2005). Karadeniz: Ansiklopedik Sözlük. Vol. 2. Istanbul: Heyamola Publishing. ISBN 975-6121-00-9.
- Magnarella, Paul J. (1979). The Peasant Venture: Tradition, Migration, and Change among Georgian Peasants in Turkey. Cambridge, MA: Schenkman Publishing Company. ISBN 0-8161-8271-X.
- Mikaberidze, Alexander, ed. (2007). "Özkan, Ahmet". Dictionary of Georgian National Biography.
