= Otluca =

Otluca is a Turkish name and it can refer to

- Otluca, a village in Artvin Province, Turkey
- Otluca, a village in Batman Province, Turkey
- Otluca, Ergani

== See also ==
- Otluca HES
