= Eskikale =

Eskikale may refer to:

- Eskikale, Artuklu
- Eskikale, Şavşat
