= Kayabaşı =

Kayabaşı is a Turkish place name and it may refer to:

- Kayabaşı, Amasya a village in Amasya (central) district of Amasya Province
- Kayabaşı, Bitlis, a village
- Kayabaşı, Polatlı a village in Polatlı district of Ankara Province
- Kayabaşı, Alanya a village in Alanya district of Antalya Province
- Kayabaşı, Kale
- Kayabaşı, Kemah
- Kayabaşı, Köprüköy
- Kayabaşı, Korkuteli a village in Korkuteli district of Antalya Province
- Kayabaşı, Şavşat a village in Şavşat district of Artvin Province
- Kayabaşı, Ulus a village in Ulus district of Bartın Province
- Kayabaşı, Mengen a village in Mengen district of Bolu Province
- Kayabaşı, Göynük a village in Göynük district of Bolu Province
- Kayabaşı, Araç a village in Araç district of Kastamonu Province
- Kayabaşı, Mut a village in Mut district of Mersin Province
