= Yamaçlı =

Yamaçlı may refer to the following settlements in Turkey:

- Yamaçlı, Boğazlıyan, a town in Yozgat Province
- Yamaçlı, Lice, a neighbourhood in Diyarbakır Province
- Yamaçlı, Şavşat, a village in Artvin Province
- Yamaçlı, Şirvan, a village in Siirt Province
