= Kireçli =

Kireçli can refer to:

- Kireçli, Şavşat
- Kireçli, Şenkaya
