= Demirkapı =

Demirkapı means "Iron gate" in Turkish and it may refer to:

- Demirkapı, Şavşat, a village in Şavşat district of Artvin Province
- Demirkapı, Mut, a village in Mut district of Mersin Province
- Demirkapı, Susurluk, a village
- Temir Kapig, a pass in Uzbekistan
- Demir Kapija, a town in the Republic of Macedonia

== See also ==
- Iron Gates
