= Ilıca =

Ilıca is Turkish for spa, spa town or hot springs. It may refer to:

- Ilıca, Erzurum, Erzurum Province, Turkey
- Ilıca, Çeşme, İzmir Province, Turkey
- Ilıca, Manavgat, Antalya Province, Turkey
- Ilıca, Şavşat, Artvin Province, Turkey
- Ilıca, Mudurnu
- Ilıca, Mut, Mersin Province, Turkey

== See also ==
- Ilidža, Bosnia and Herzegovina
- Paşa Ilıcası, Turkey
