= Küplüce =

Küplüce can refer to:

== Place names ==
=== Turkey ===
- Küplüce, Arıcak
- Küplüce, Bolu
- Küplüce, Şavşat
- Küplüce, Yusufeli
