= Acharian =

Acharian may refer to:

- Acharian people, an ethnographic group of Georgians
- Hrachia Acharian (1876–1953), Armenian linguist
