= Çavdarlı =

Çavdarlı may refer to:

- Çavdarlı, Aziziye
- Çavdarlı, Hanak, village in Ardahan Province, Turkey
- Çavdarlı, Şavşat, village in Artvin Province, Turkey
- Çavdarlı, Tarsus, village in Mersin Province, Turkey

== People with the surname ==
- Cemal Çavdarlı, Turkish-Belgian politician
