= Kayadibi =

Kayadibi (literally "rock bottom" in Turkish) may refer to the following places in Turkey:

- Kayadibi, Antalya, a village in the district of Antalya, Antalya Province
- Kayadibi, Bartın, a village in the district of Bartın, Bartın Province
- Kayadibi, Borçka, a village in the district of Borçka, Artvin Province
- Kayadibi, Elmadağ, a village in the district of Elmadağ, Ankara Province
- Kayadibi, Feke, a village in the district of Feke, Adana Province
- Kayadibi, Kahta, a village in the district of Kahta, Adıyaman Province
- Kayadibi, Kozluk, a village in the district of Kozluk, Batman Province
- Kayadibi, Sinanpaşa, a village in the district of Sinanpaşa, Afyonkarahisar Province
- Kayadibi, Şavşat, a village in the district of Şavşat, Artvin Province
- Kayadibi, Tarsus, a village in the district of Tarsus, Mersin Province
- Kayadibi, Taşköprü, a village
- Kayadibi, Yeşilova, a village in the district of Yeşilova, Burdur Province
