= Çayağzı =

Çayağzı (Turkish: "mouth of the creek") may refer to the following places in Turkey:

- Çayağzı, Akçakoca
- Çayağzı, Hanak, a village in Hanak district, Ardahan Province
- Çayağzı, Kırşehir, a village in the central (Kırşehir) district, Kırşehir Province
- Çayağzı, Şavşat, a village in Şavşat district, Artvin Province
- Another name of Riva, Beykoz, a village in Beykoz district, Istanbul Province
