= Dragon Creek (disambiguation) =

Dragon Creek may refer to

- Dragon Creek in Cariboo region of British Columbia, Canada
- Dragon Creek in Anamur district of Mersin Province, Turkey
- Dragon Creek (Delaware River tributary), a stream in New Castle County, Delaware, USA

== See also ==
- Dragon River Bridge
