= Kocabey =

Kocabey can refer to the following villages in Turkey:

- Kocabey, Şavşat
- Kocabey, Sındırgı
