= Cevizli, Şavşat =

Cevizli
- Village
- Location within Turkey
- Coordinates: 41°18′N 42°23′E
- Country: Turkey
- Province: Artvin
- District: Şavşat
- Population (2021): 440
- Time zone: UTC+3 (TRT)

Cevizli is a village in the Şavşat District, Artvin Province, Turkey. Its population is 440 (2021). The Tbeti Monastery is located in the center of the village.
