= Yaşar, Şavşat =

Yaşar
- Village
- Location within Turkey
- Coordinates: 41.2678°N 42.3584°E
- Country: Turkey
- Province: Artvin
- District: Şavşat
- Population (2021): 63
- Time zone: UTC+3 (TRT)

Yaşar is a village in the Şavşat District, Artvin Province, Turkey. Its population is 63 (2021).
