= Şavşat Castle =

Turkish castle

Coordinates: 41.2592°N 42.3269°E

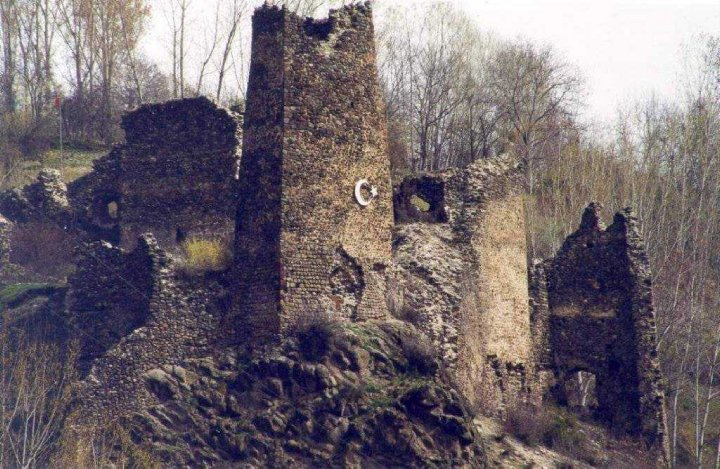
Castle.

Şavşat Castle or Satle Castle (Georgian: სათლესციხე) is a castle in Şavşat district in Artvin Province in Turkey.

The castle was built during the Georgian Bagrationi kingdom in the 9th century. It was used by the Seljuk Turkish regional governors, called Atabegs, in the 12th century, and after that by the Ottomans.

Much of the castle wall is still standing, as well as the castle dungeons, and the remains of a church on the northern side. The castle's main feature is its "strange trapezoidal towers".

Daily Sabah notes that "Şavşat Castel is also a popular destination in the town for history buffs. Although when it was built is unknown due to its architectural resemblance to other buildings around the region, the castle is believed to have been built by Georgian Bagratids around the ninth century.

Archaeological excavations took place at the castle over 10 years, according to Anadolu Agency, who say that "since 2007, academicians from Gazi, Denizli and Sinop universities have been working in the castle in addition to their own universities." Archaeologists found "approximately 50 portable cultural assets, including gold coins from the reign of Suleiman the Magnificent, cannon balls, and glazed and unglazed ceramic vessels".

Milliyet reported in 2017 that the castle included "towers, a chapel, bey's mansion, grand hall, wine cellar, and pharmaceutical warehouse". The castle was reportedly used into the 19th century when it was quarried for stone, and then fell into disuse after the Russian occupation from 1878 until the First World War. Following the end of excavations there was a plan to restore the castle and open it for tourism.
