= Çoraklı, Şavşat =

Çoraklı
- Village
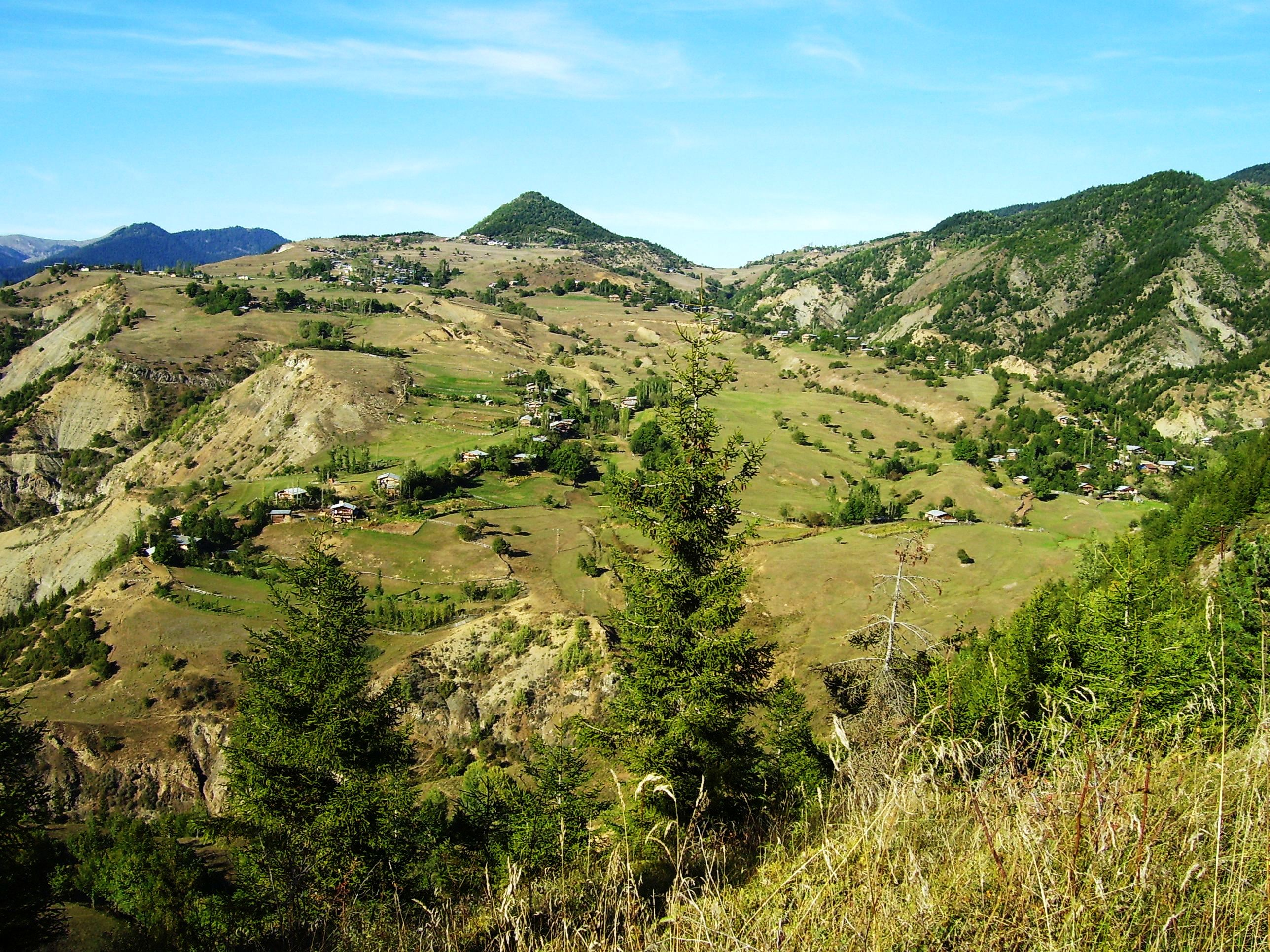

- Location within Turkey
- Coordinates: 41°22′N 42°22′E
- Country: Turkey
- Province: Artvin
- District: Şavşat
- Population (2021): 212
- Time zone: UTC+3 (TRT)

Çoraklı is a village in the Şavşat District, Artvin Province, Turkey. Its population is 212 (2021).
