= Ziyaret, Şavşat =

Ziyaret
- Village
- Location within Turkey
- Coordinates: 41.2079°N 42.2862°E
- Country: Turkey
- Province: Artvin
- District: Şavşat
- Population (2021): 100
- Time zone: UTC+3 (TRT)

Ziyaret is a village in the Şavşat District, Artvin Province, Turkey. Its population is 100 (2021).
