= Çermik, Şavşat =

Çermik
- Village
- Location within Turkey
- Coordinates: 41.4130°N 42.3988°E
- Country: Turkey
- Province: Artvin
- District: Şavşat
- Population (2021): 29
- Time zone: UTC+3 (TRT)

Çermik is a village in the Şavşat District, Artvin Province, Turkey. Its population is 29 (2021).
