= Kirazlı, Şavşat =

Kirazlı
- Village
- Location within Turkey
- Coordinates: 41.2636°N 42.4902°E
- Country: Turkey
- Province: Artvin
- District: Şavşat
- Population (2021): 204
- Time zone: UTC+3 (TRT)

Kirazlı is a village in the Şavşat District, Artvin Province, Turkey. Its population is 204 (2021).
