= Akdamla, Şavşat =

Akdamla
- Village
- Location within Turkey
- Coordinates: 41°25′N 42°22′E
- Country: Turkey
- Province: Artvin
- District: Şavşat
- Population (2021): 104
- Time zone: UTC+3 (TRT)

Akdamla is a village in the Şavşat District, Artvin Province, Turkey. Its population is 104 (2021).
