= Dalkırmaz, Şavşat =

Dalkırmaz
- Village
- Location within Turkey
- Coordinates: 41°15′N 42°16′E
- Country: Turkey
- Province: Artvin
- District: Şavşat
- Population (2021): 88
- Time zone: UTC+3 (TRT)

Dalkırmaz is a village in the Şavşat District, Artvin Province, Turkey. Its population is 88 (2021).
