= Pınarlı, Şavşat =

Pınarlı
- Village
- Location within Turkey
- Coordinates: 41.3584°N 42.4657°E
- Country: Turkey
- Province: Artvin
- District: Şavşat
- Population (2021): 590
- Time zone: UTC+3 (TRT)

Pınarlı is a village in the Şavşat District, Artvin Province, Turkey. Its population is 590 (2021).

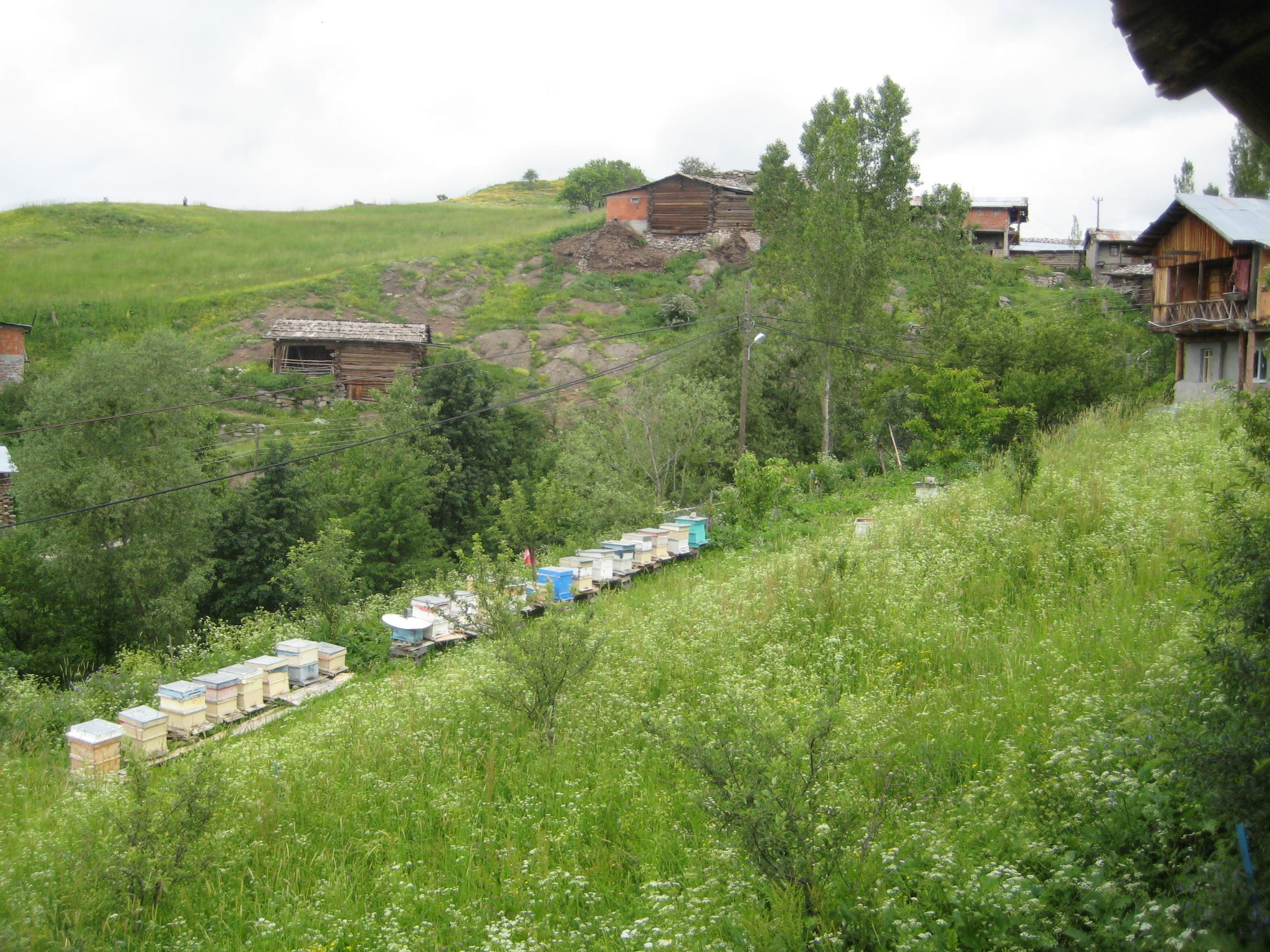
Pınarlı
