= Saylıca, Şavşat =

Saylıca
- Village
- Location within Turkey
- Coordinates: 41.3309°N 42.3315°E
- Country: Turkey
- Province: Artvin
- District: Şavşat
- Population (2021): 35
- Time zone: UTC+3 (TRT)

Saylıca is a village in the Şavşat District, Artvin Province, Turkey. Its population is 35 (2021).
