= Hanlı, Şavşat =

Hanlı
- Village
- Location within Turkey
- Coordinates: 41.2092°N 42.3253°E
- Country: Turkey
- Province: Artvin
- District: Şavşat
- Population (2021): 175
- Time zone: UTC+3 (TRT)

Hanlı is a village in the Şavşat District, Artvin Province, Turkey. Its population is 175 (2021).
