= Şenköy, Şavşat =

Şenköy
- Village
- Location within Turkey
- Coordinates: 41.3760°N 42.3764°E
- Country: Turkey
- Province: Artvin
- District: Şavşat
- Population (2021): 50
- Time zone: UTC+3 (TRT)

Şenköy is a village in the Şavşat District, Artvin Province, Turkey. Its population is 50 (2021).
