= Atalar, Şavşat =

Atalar
- Village
- Location within Turkey
- Coordinates: 41.3482°N 42.3572°E
- Country: Turkey
- Province: Artvin
- District: Şavşat
- Population (2021): 52
- Time zone: UTC+3 (TRT)

Atalar is a village in the Şavşat District, Artvin Province, Turkey. Its population is 52 (2021).
