= Savaş, Şavşat =

Savaş
- Village
- Location within Turkey
- Coordinates: 41°13′39″N 42°14′1″E
- Country: Turkey
- Province: Artvin
- District: Şavşat
- Population (2021): 204
- Time zone: UTC+3 (TRT)

Savaş is a village in the Şavşat District, Artvin Province, Turkey. Its population is 204 (2021). Turket savas savas
