= Köprüyaka, Şavşat =

Köprüyaka
- Village
- Location within Turkey
- Coordinates: 41°15′N 42°20′E
- Country: Turkey
- Province: Artvin
- District: Şavşat
- Population (2021): 136
- Time zone: UTC+3 (TRT)

Köprüyaka is a village in the Şavşat District, Artvin Province, Turkey. Its population is 136 (2021).
