= Aşağıkoyunlu, Şavşat =

Aşağıkoyunlu
- Village
- Location within Turkey
- Coordinates: 41°17′N 42°28′E
- Country: Turkey
- Province: Artvin
- District: Şavşat
- Population (2021): 183
- Time zone: UTC+3 (TRT)

Aşağıkoyunlu is a village in the Şavşat District, Artvin Province, Turkey. Its population is 183 (2021).
