= Üzümlü, Şavşat =

Üzümlü
- Village
- Location within Turkey
- Coordinates: 41.2562°N 42.2088°E
- Country: Turkey
- Province: Artvin
- District: Şavşat
- Population (2021): 105
- Time zone: UTC+3 (TRT)

Üzümlü is a village in the Şavşat District, Artvin Province, Turkey. Its population is 105 (2021).

The former name of Üzümlü village was Mukhobani. Muhobani (მუხობანი), a Georgian place name, is a variant of Mukhovani (მუხოვანი), meaning “oak-covered”.
