= Ciritdüzü, Şavşat =

Ciritdüzü
- Village
- Location within Turkey
- Country: Turkey
- Province: Artvin
- District: Şavşat
- Population (2021): 226
- Time zone: UTC+3 (TRT)

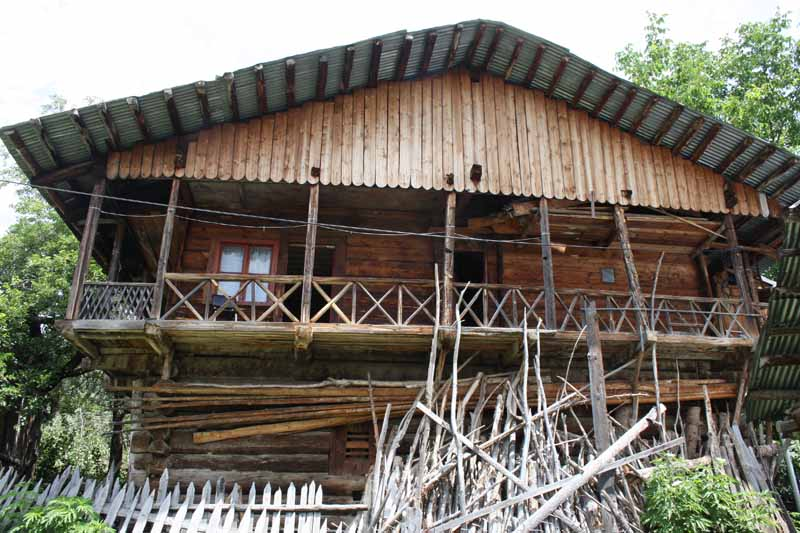
Village house in Ciritdüzü

Ciritdüzü is a village in the Şavşat District, Artvin Province, Turkey. Its population is 226 (2021).
