= Susuz, Şavşat =

Susuz
- Village
- Location within Turkey
- Coordinates: 41.2438°N 42.2758°E
- Country: Turkey
- Province: Artvin
- District: Şavşat
- Population (2021): 124
- Time zone: UTC+3 (TRT)

Susuz is a village in the Şavşat District, Artvin Province, Turkey. Its population is 124 (2021).
