= Tepeköy, Şavşat =

Tepeköy
- Village
- Location within Turkey
- Coordinates: 41.3031°N 42.3168°E
- Country: Turkey
- Province: Artvin
- District: Şavşat
- Population (2021): 458
- Time zone: UTC+3 (TRT)

Tepeköy is a village in the Şavşat District, Artvin Province, Turkey. Its population is 458 (2021).
