= Tbeti Monastery =

Medieval Georgian Orthodox monastery

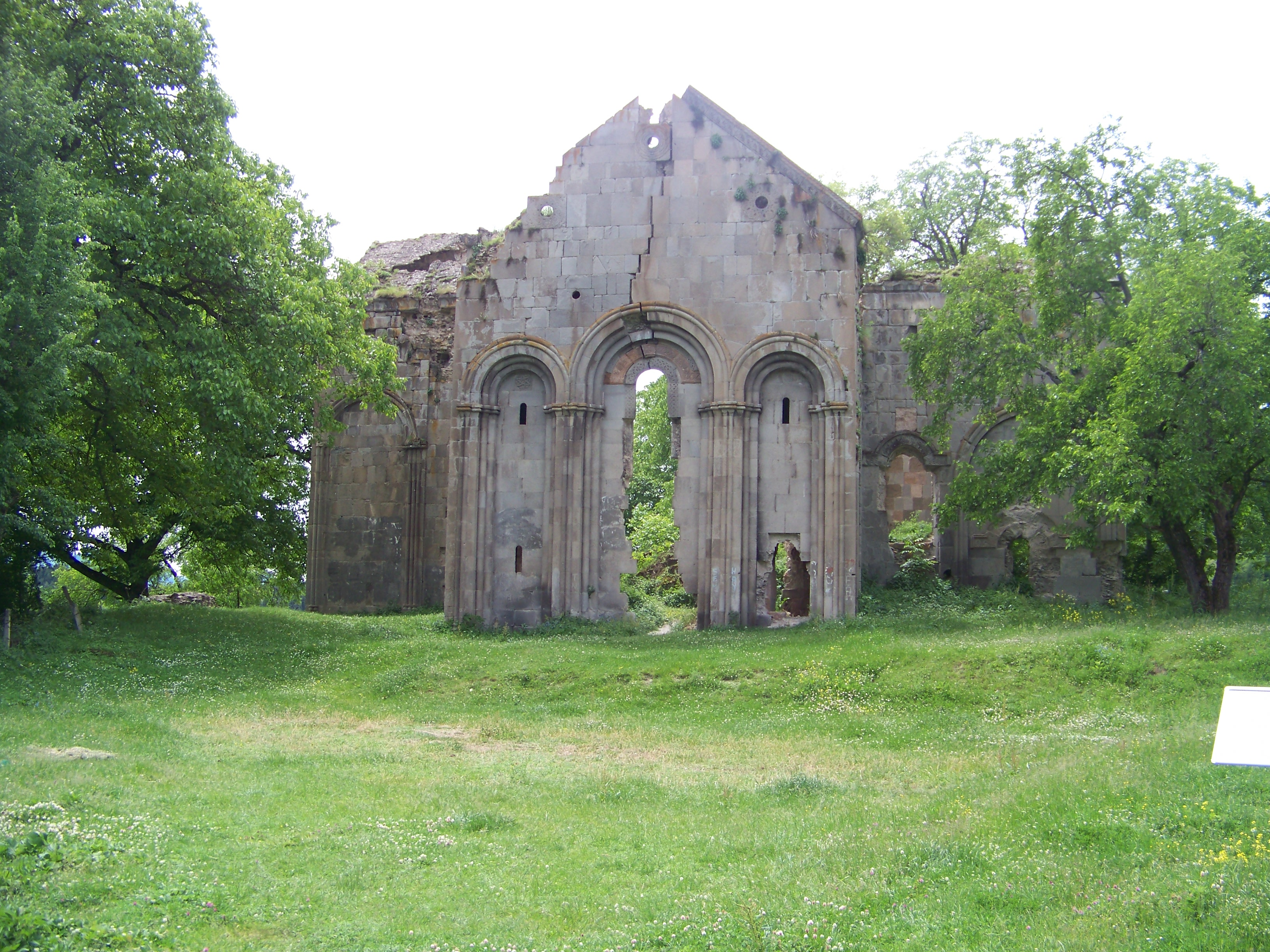
- Interactive map of Tbeti Monastery

Monastery information
- Denomination: Georgian Orthodox
- Dedication: Virgin Mary

Architecture
- Status: Inactive

Site
- Location: Ardahan Province, Turkey
- Coordinates: 41°18′16″N 42°23′21″E

The Monastery of the Virgin Mary of Tbeti (Georgian:ტბეთის ეკლესია) is a ruined medieval Georgian Orthodox monastery. It was built in the historical territory of Georgia, and is now found in Turkey. It is located on the banks of the Imerkhevi river, and is 15 kilometres (9.3 mi) away from the present-day city of Şavşat. The Tbeti Monastery was an important cultural and literary center of medieval Georgia, where many hagiographic works were written by the monks living in the monastery. The monastery was made up of several buildings, of which only the ruins of the main temple remain to this day. A Muslim mosque was also operated within the temple grounds, until the end of the 19th century.

== History ==
=== Construction ===
The first church of Tbeti was constructed in the early 10th century by Ashot Kukhi, a Georgian Bagratid prince. He then appointed the first bishop, Stepane Mtbevari as the Bishop of the Diocese of Tbeti (the Diocese of Tbeti included Shavsheti and some parts of Adjara).

The cathedral was of cross-domed architectural type. It is not clear whether the cathedral was initially dedicated to Saint George or to the Virgin Mary.

Plan of the eight-nave temple (Second Construction) Remains Reconstructed

The second construction occurred after the founding of the original cathedral by Ashot Kukhi in 918 AD. The church was rebuilt in 960 AD with eight segments in the form of an octagon. This is considered as the second stage of the construction of the monastery. There are only some remains of the eight-nave church left, as it was quickly replaced by the third church.

At the end of the 10th century, the third construction was carried out in the church. As a result, a new, domed church was erected in place of the eight-nave church. It is currently unknown whether this construction was preceded by the destruction of the old church or whether the old church was reconstructed during the construction of the new church to expand the space. This church is the third among the churches of Tbeti, despite significant damage and subsequent numerous reconstructions, its basic forms have been preserved to this day.

The fourth construction was carried out in the 11th century. It aimed to increase the volume of the church and decorate the facades more richly.

The fifth construction took place in the 13th century. During this period, the southern wing of the church was restored.

The sixth construction work in the Tbeti Cathedral was carried out in the 14th century. During this construction, the dome was restored. The dome no longer exists today, but is visible in the photographs of A. Pavlinov and Nikolai Marr

=== Frescoes ===
The interior of the cathedral was frescoed. Fragments of the image of the enthroned Savior can still be distinguished in the upper register of the apse of the altar. Angels and cherubims are depicted on both sides of it. In the middle register of the apse, on either side of the window, the Holy Mother of God and Saint John the Baptist were depicted, followed by the apostles. (Note: The heads of several figures have survived.)

=== Later history ===
Services were held in the Tbeti Cathedral even after the conquest of Shavsheti by the Turks. The episcopal see existed here until at least the second half of the 17th century. Later, the see was abolished and the monastery was taken over by Muslims and was converted into a mosque by the locals. It operated until the end of the 19th century. It is said that the Turks did not carry out any repair and left the building unchanged.

In 1889, a new mosque was built in Tbeti. It's facades were entirely made of stones that had fallen from the temple. In 1961, the cathedral was badly damaged by an explosion, which destroyed the dome and the upper parts of the arms of the church building. The explosion provided the villagers with a huge supply of ready made building materials. The stones from the ruins of the temple was used by the villagers for the construction of their own houses.

== Other buildings of the monastery ==
Today, no other buildings survive on the territory of the Tbeti Monastery, except for the ruins of the main temple. Information about other buildings is provided by records, sketches, drawings and a small number of photographs, such as by Pavlinov.

=== Bell tower ===
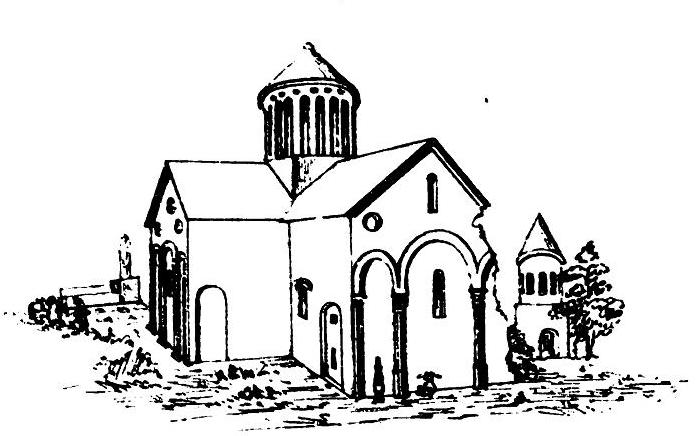
Giorgi Kazbegi's 1874 sketch of the Tbeti Cathedral. The drawing shows the bell tower which is to the right of the cathedral and the stele on the left.

The Tbeti bell tower was located about 10 metres (33 ft) southwest of the Tbeti temple. The bell tower is depicted on Giorgi Kazbegi's drawing. The date of the demolition of the bell tower has occurred on c. 1887 .

The Tbeti bell tower was a two-story building. The lower floor was a square- shaped building which was open on all four sides with arches. The second floor was an octagonal window with an eight-bay arch. Giorgi Kazbegi and Countess Praskovya Uvarova spoke about the low quality of the building's construction and decoration.

==== Bell tower inscriptions ====
Two inscriptions are known from the Tbeti bell tower. Nikolai Marr discovered one of these inscriptions in the house of one of the villagers, where it was placed. The heads of several figures have survived along with other stones taken from the ruins of the bell tower. The upper three lines of the seven-line inscription were completely torn off, along with the fourth and the beginning of the seventh lines . The rest (from the fourth line) read as follows:

...R mos(a)vsa
...itos mtbev
...q(o)r(o)nik(o)nsa sie

This fragment confirmed that the inscription is from the bell tower and the date of its construction was established in 1527. Nikolai Marr saw another better preserved inscription, which, according to local residents, was also removed from the ruins of the bell tower. It read:

Christ is above this,
the
one who is

Nikolai Marr considered this inscription to be a tombstone.

=== Stele ===
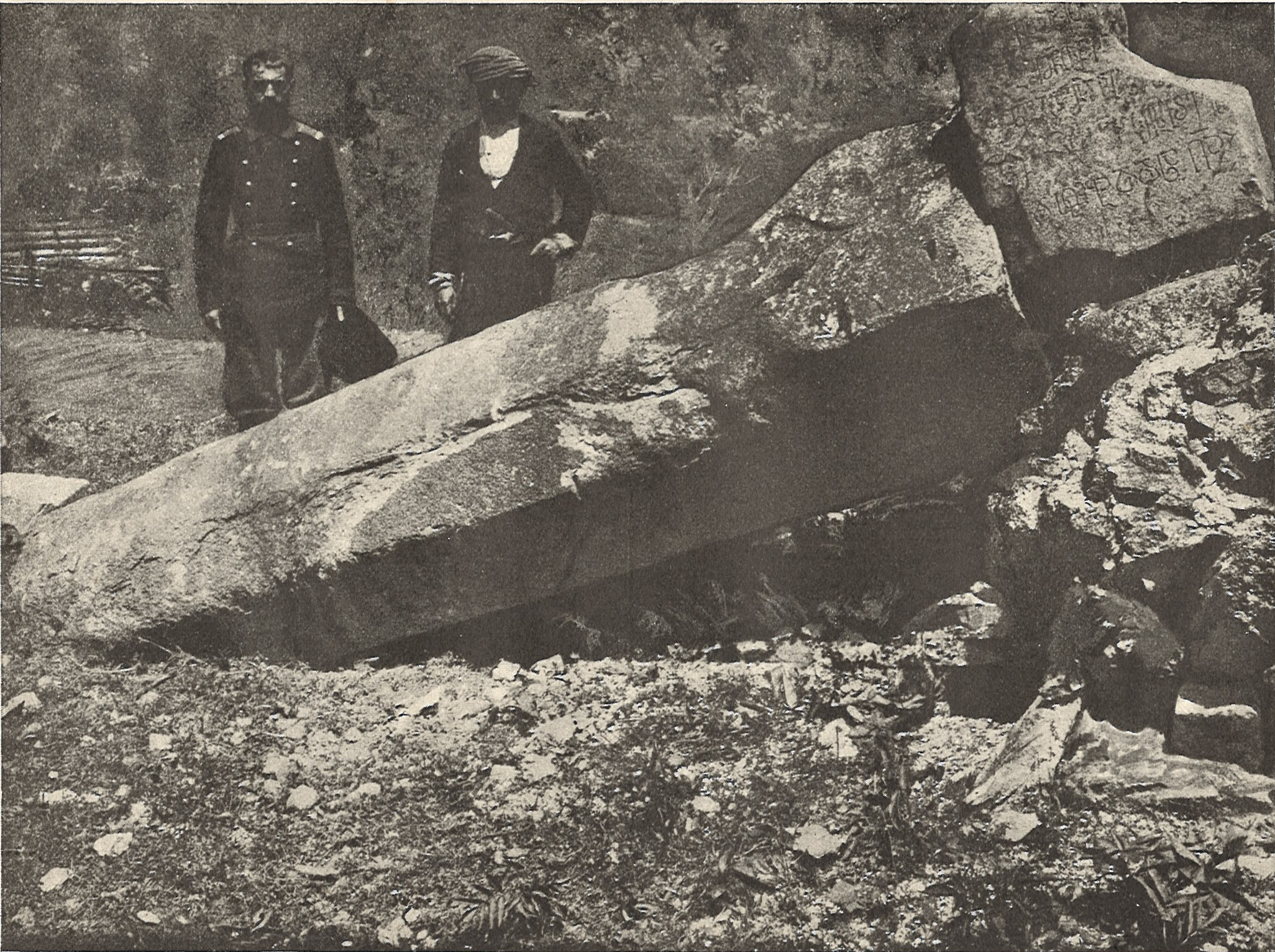
The Stele was found to be fallen by Nikolai Marr

A large stone stele stood to the southeast of the temple. The stele was of 4.25-meter height and was made of reddish volcanic stone. It had an octagonal shape and narrowed towards the top. It was seen in good condition by Pr. Uvarova and A. Pavlinov. Nikolai Marr found that the stele had already fallen and was broken in two and founded that both fragments are missing. The pedestal of the stele, which was still in place during Nikolai Marr's trip, is also not visible.

=== Tomb of the Mother of God ===
The existence of a so-called Tomb of the Mother of God, on the territory of the Tbeti monastery is only an assumption and is based on a heavily damaged six-line large slab found by Nikolai Marr a few meters away from the temple.

== Gallery ==
- Pavlinov's photographs taken in 1888
  Southern facade
  Tbeti Temple in 1888
  Eastern facade
  Column of the temple
  An altar painting
  A column of the Temple
  The windows of the southern facade of the temple
  Interior
  Northern facade

== See also ==
- Christianity in Turkey
