= Arpalı, Şavşat =

Arpalı
- Village
- Location within Turkey
- Coordinates: 41.2305°N 42.3057°E
- Country: Turkey
- Province: Artvin
- District: Şavşat
- Population (2021): 198
- Time zone: UTC+3 (TRT)

Arpalı is a village in the Şavşat District, Artvin Province, Turkey. Its population is 198 (2021).
