= Karaağaç, Şavşat =

Karaağaç
- Village
- Location within Turkey
- Coordinates: 41°10′51″N 42°17′47″E
- Country: Turkey
- Province: Artvin
- District: Şavşat
- Population (2021): 104
- Time zone: UTC+3 (TRT)

Karaağaç is a village in the Şavşat District, Artvin Province, Turkey. Its population is 104 (2021).
