= Otluca HES =

- Location within Turkey
- Country: Turkey
- Location: Sugözü, Anamur, Mersin Province
- Coordinates: 36°18′14″N 32°46′36″E

Dam and spillways
- Impounds: Dragon Creek

Power Station
- Installed capacity: 47.7 MWe
- Annual generation: 224 GWh

Otluca HES is a three-stage hydroelectric plant of Turkey.

It is in Anamur ilçe (district) of Mersin Province. It is to the north of Anamur and on Dragon Creek. The main unit is at 36°18′14″N 32°46′36″E

== Technical details ==
The technical details are as follows;

Name of the plant	Hydraulic head	Power
Otluca 1	208 metres (682 ft)	36.9 MWe
Otluca 2	28 metres (92 ft)	5.8 MWe
Boğuntu	65 metres (213 ft)	3.3 MWe

The total annual energy production capacity is 224 GW-hr. But currently the last unit hasn't been put into operation yet . The plant is being operated by the company Beyobası ( a subdiary of Akfen) .
