= Meşeli, Şavşat =

Meşeli
- Village
- Location within Turkey
- Coordinates: 41.3131°N 42.4670°E
- Country: Turkey
- Province: Artvin
- District: Şavşat
- Population (2021): 274
- Time zone: UTC+3 (TRT)

Meşeli is a village in the Şavşat District, Artvin Province, Turkey. Its population is 274 (2021).
