= Yoncalı, Şavşat =

Yoncalı
- Village
- Location within Turkey
- Coordinates: 41.3431°N 42.4480°E
- Country: Turkey
- Province: Artvin
- District: Şavşat
- Population (2021): 233
- Time zone: UTC+3 (TRT)

Yoncalı is a village in the Şavşat District, Artvin Province, Turkey. Its population is 233 (2021).
