= Kurudere, Şavşat =

Kurudere
- Village
- Location within Turkey
- Coordinates: 41.2551°N 42.3334°E
- Country: Turkey
- Province: Artvin
- District: Şavşat
- Population (2021): 115
- Time zone: UTC+3 (TRT)

Kurudere is a village in the Şavşat District, Artvin Province, Turkey. Its population is 115 (2021).
