= Çiftlik, Şavşat =

Çiftlik
- Village
- Location within Turkey
- Coordinates: 41.2331°N 42.2643°E
- Country: Turkey
- Province: Artvin
- District: Şavşat
- Population (2021): 162
- Time zone: UTC+3 (TRT)

Çiftlik is a village in the Şavşat District, Artvin Province, Turkey. Its population is 162 (2021).
