= Çamlıca, Şavşat =

Çamlıca
- Village
- Location within Turkey
- Coordinates: 41.1848°N 42.3425°E
- Country: Turkey
- Province: Artvin
- District: Şavşat
- Population (2021): 88
- Time zone: UTC+3 (TRT)

Çamlıca is a village in the Şavşat District, Artvin Province, Turkey. Its population is 88 (2021).
