= Elmalı, Şavşat =

Elmalı
- Village
- Location within Turkey
- Coordinates: 41.2623°N 42.3195°E
- Country: Turkey
- Province: Artvin
- District: Şavşat
- Population (2021): 98
- Time zone: UTC+3 (TRT)

Elmalı is a village in the Şavşat District, Artvin Province, Turkey. Its population is 98 (2021).
