= Veliköy, Şavşat =

Veliköy
- Village
- Location within Turkey
- Coordinates: 41.3153°N 42.4325°E
- Country: Turkey
- Province: Artvin
- District: Şavşat
- Population (2021): 229
- Time zone: UTC+3 (TRT)

Veliköy is a village in the Şavşat District, Artvin Province, Turkey. Its population is 229 (2021).
