= Kayabaşı, Şavşat =

Kayabaşı
- Village
- Location within Turkey
- Coordinates: 41.3196°N 42.3047°E
- Country: Turkey
- Province: Artvin
- District: Şavşat
- Population (2021): 24
- Time zone: UTC+3 (TRT)

Kayabaşı is a village in the Şavşat District, Artvin Province, Turkey. Its population is 24 (2021).
