= Çayağzı, Şavşat =

Çayağzı
- Village
- Location within Turkey
- Coordinates: 41.2674°N 42.2262°E
- Country: Turkey
- Province: Artvin
- District: Şavşat
- Population (2021): 169
- Time zone: UTC+3 (TRT)

Çayağzı is a village in the Şavşat District, Artvin Province, Turkey. Its population is 169 (2021).
