= Yavuzköy, Şavşat =

Yavuzköy
- Village
- Location in Turkey
- Coordinates: 41.2297°N 42.3920°E
- Country: Turkey
- Province: Artvin
- District: Şavşat
- Population (2021): 454
- Time zone: UTC+3 (TRT)

Yavuzköy is a village in the Şavşat District, Artvin Province, Turkey. Its population is 454 (2021).
