= Otluca, Şavşat =

Otluca
- Village
- Location within Turkey
- Country: Turkey
- Province: Artvin
- District: Şavşat
- Population (2021): 82
- Time zone: UTC+3 (TRT)

Otluca is a village in the Şavşat District, Artvin Province, Turkey. Its population is 82 (2021).
