= Şavşat =

- Municipality
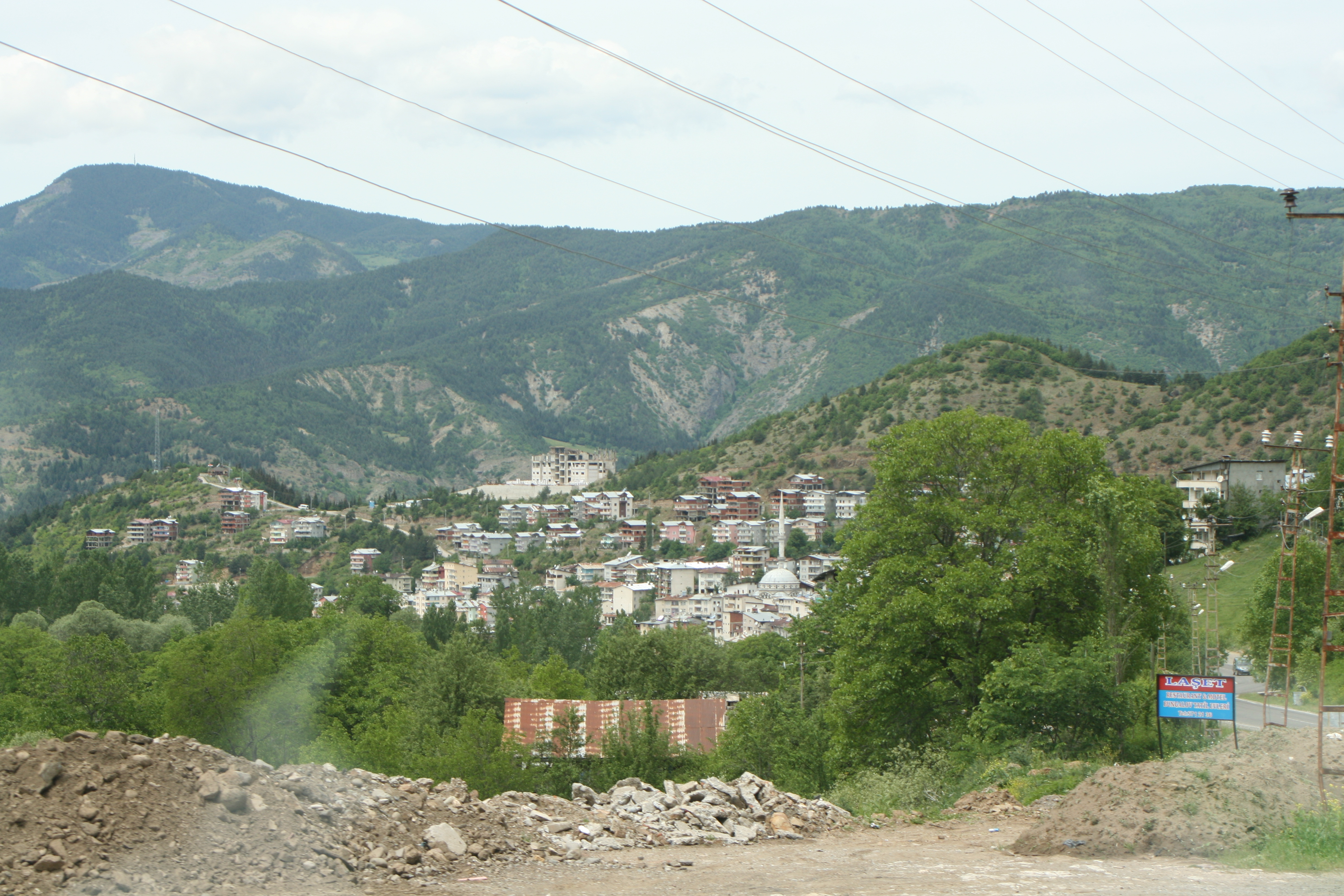
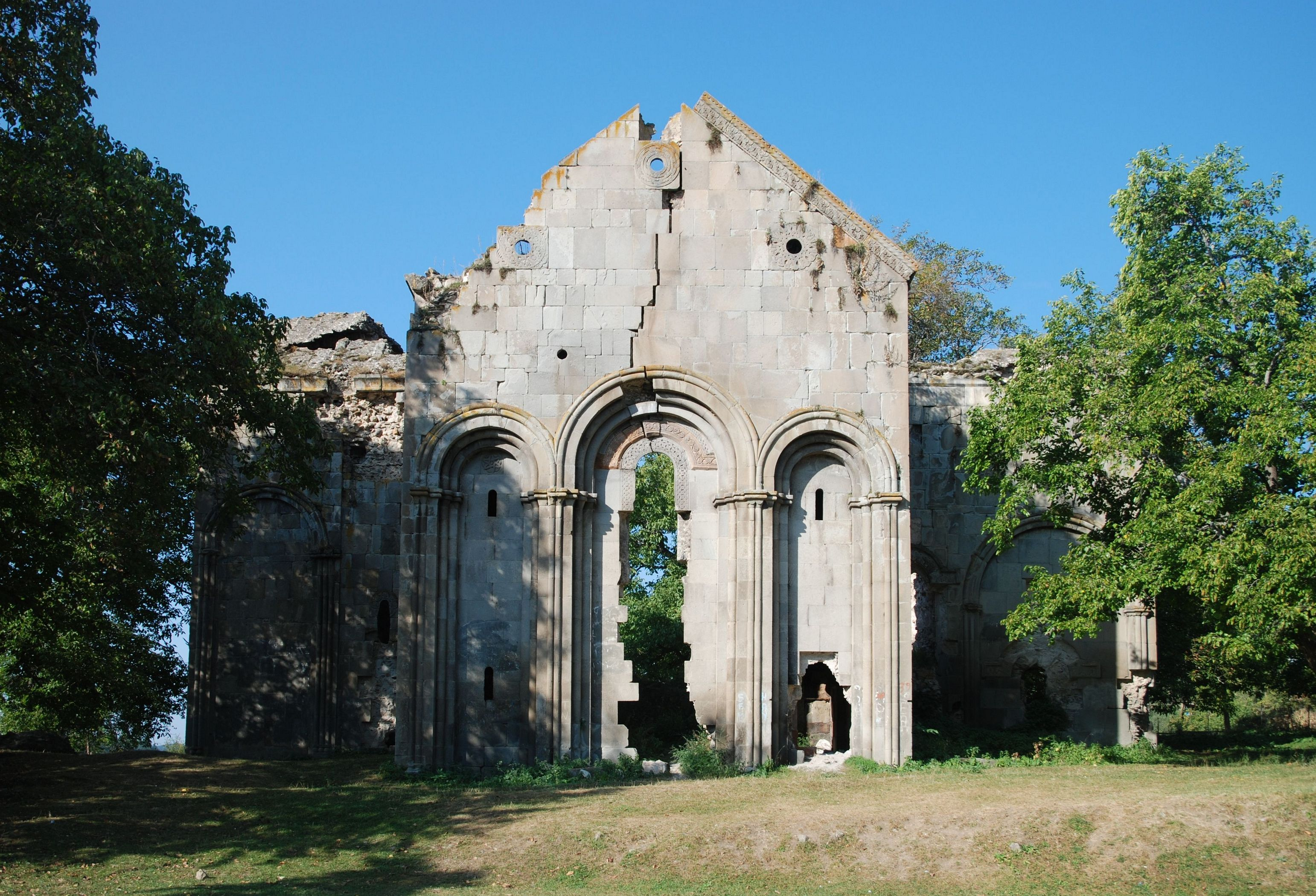
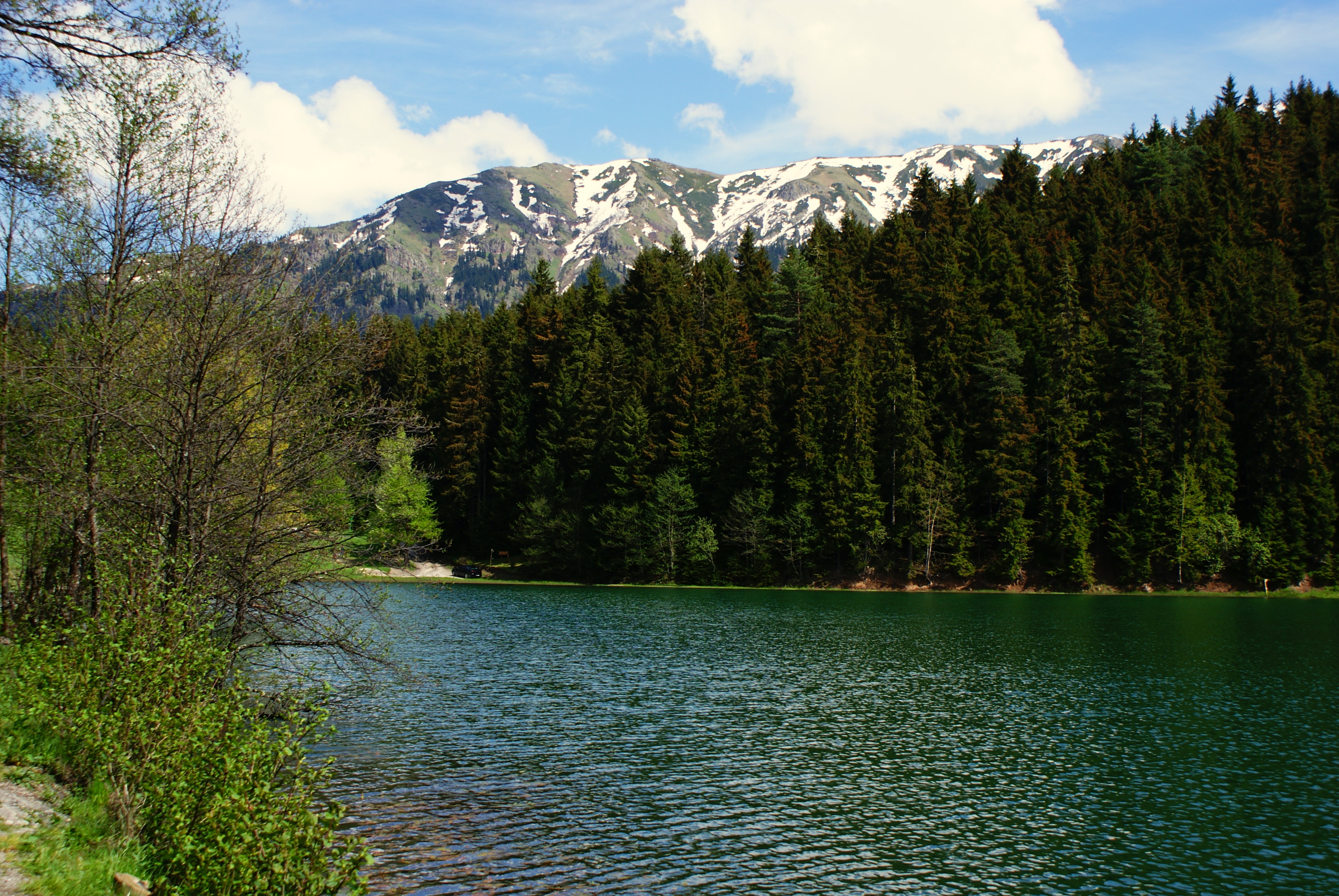
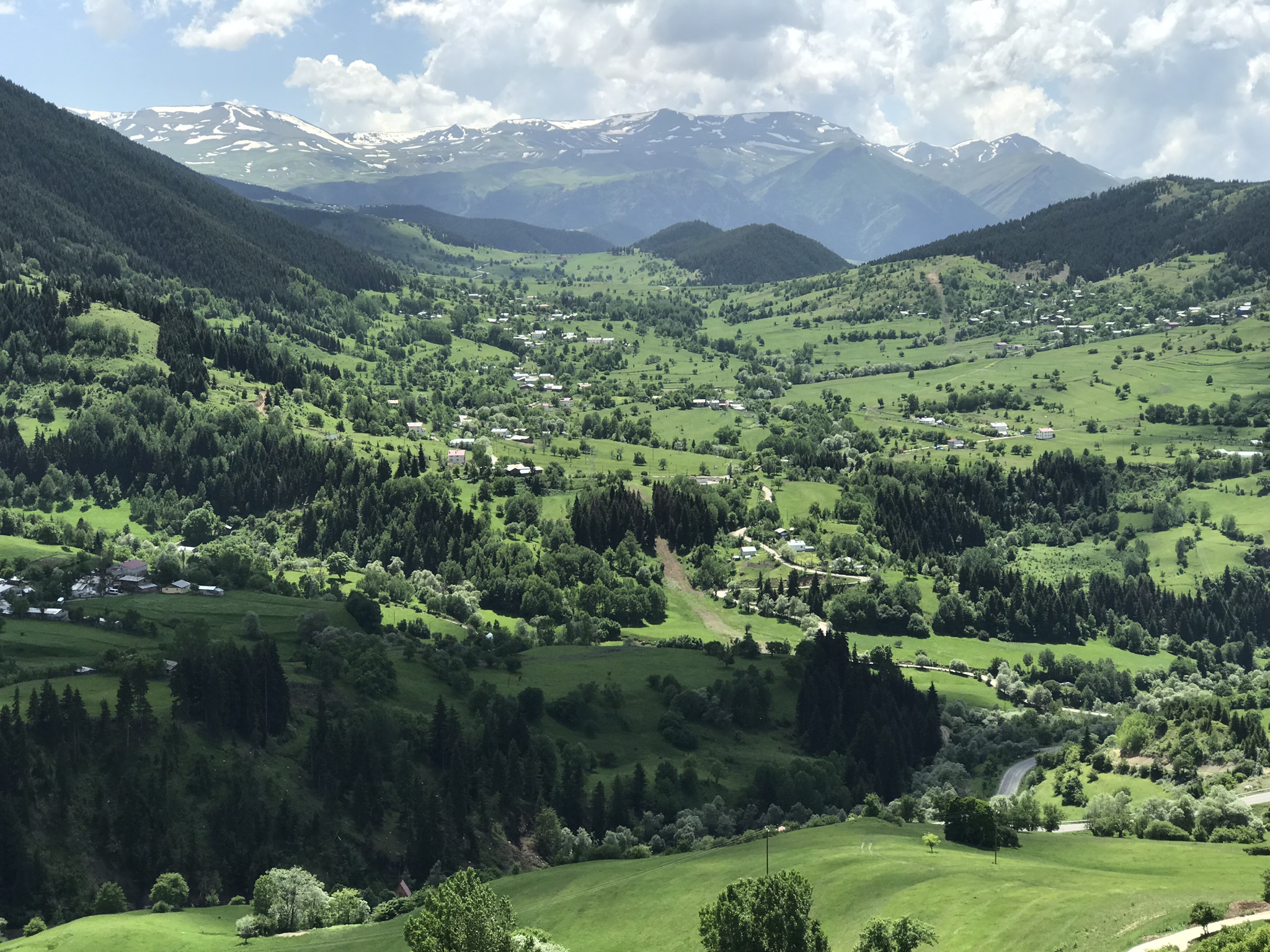
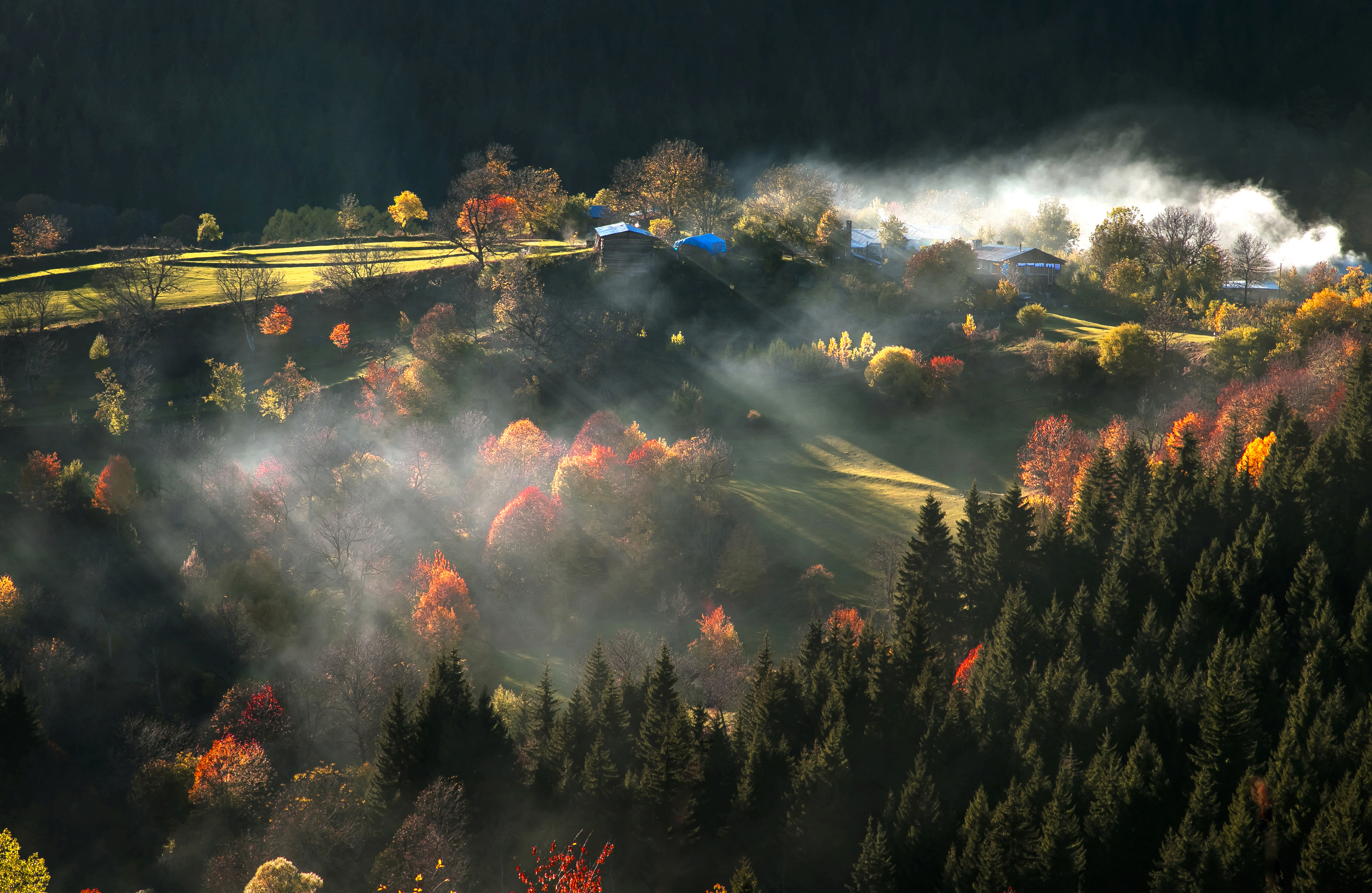
- A view of Şavşat Tbeti Monastery in Cevizli Karagöl-Sahara National Park Yavuzköy and Düzenli Şavşat in autumn

- Location within Turkey
- Coordinates: 41°14′36″N 42°21′50″E
- Country: Turkey
- Province: Artvin
- District: Şavşat

Government
  - Mayor: Durmuş Aydin (AKP)
- Elevation: 1,174 m (3,852 ft)
- Population (2021): 6,048
- Time zone: UTC+3 (TRT)
- Postal code: 08700
- Climate: Dfb
- Website: www.savsat.bel.tr

Historical Shavsheti region in the 8th-10th centuries

Şavşat (Georgian: შავშეთი, romanized: shavsheti) is a town in Artvin Province in the Black Sea region, between the cities of Artvin and Kars on the border with Georgia at the far eastern end of Turkey. It is the seat of Şavşat District. Its population is 6,048 (2021).

== History ==
According to Rayfield, in 790 BC, King Menua of Urartu invaded Shesheti in Kingdom of Diauehi, which is the Kartvelian province of Shavsheti.

In 387 this land was a part of Marzpan Iberia (vassal of Iran). After this, in IX century it was one of the Georgian princedoms in the constellation of several polities which is conventionally known as Tao-Klarjeti in Georgian. The princedom of Shavsheti included today's districts of Şavşat, Borçka, and Murgul in Turkey and Lower Machakheli in Adjara (Georgia). The fortress above the town is primarily of Georgian construction and probably dates from the 9th century A.D., when it was rebuilt by Adarnase I of Iberia. The site has an impressive circuit wall with strategically placed towers and rooms, including two small chapels. In 1983 the fortress was surveyed and three years later an accurate scaled plan and description were published.

This lasted until it was conquered by the Ottomans in 1547.

Following the Russo-Turkish War (1877-1878) Şavşat was among the territories ceded to Russia, and was returned to the new Republic of Turkey in 1921. It was briefly bounded to Ardahan Province between 27 February 1921 and 7 July 1921. People living in Şavşat and Imerkhevi are a mix of Georgians, Turkified Georgians, and ethnic Turks (both Ottoman settlers, and earlier Cuman-Kipchak Turks (settled during medieval Georgian kingdom as mercenaries).

== Geography ==
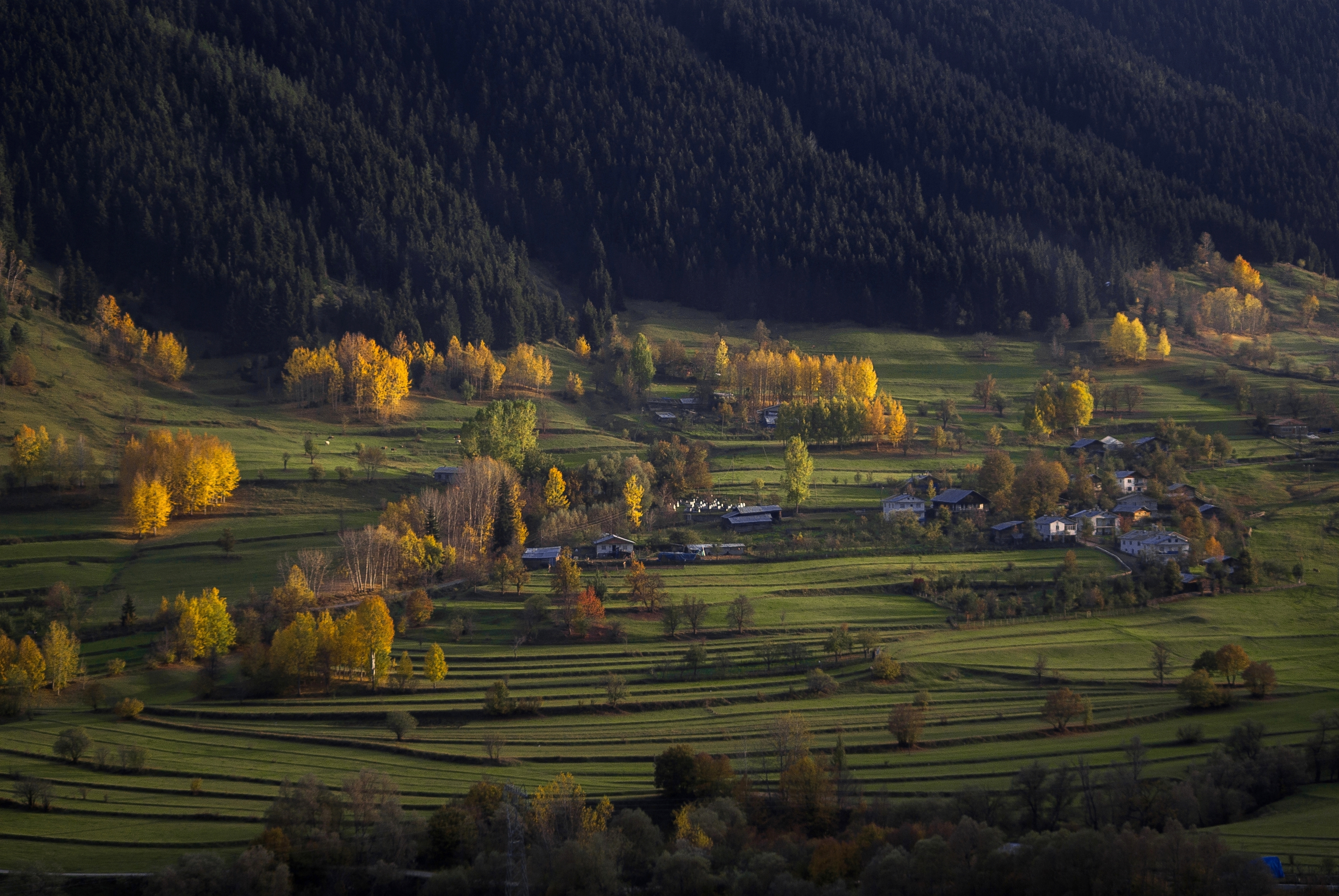
Şavşat, Artvin

Like most districts of Artvin this is a beautiful hilly area surrounded by high mountains on all sides, including the 3,537-metre (11,604 ft) Karçkal mountains to the west, and watered by many mountain streams and pools. There are trout in the largest, Şavşat Karagöl lake and a number of mineral water springs. The area has a cold inland climate, somewhat tempered by being above the Black Sea coast, but at these altitudes winter lasts a long time; it snows from November to April. The mountains are covered with pine forest, with some broadleaf forest at lower elevations.

In this landscape there is little agricultural land, no industry and the only real potential income is from tourism (people on trekking holidays), herding animals on the mountainside and beekeeping. There are some fruit trees (mainly pears and apples) and some potatoes are grown in the Çoruh River valley floor. Of the land area 13% can be planted while 27% is used for grazing, 42% is forest and 17% is high mountain.

The town of Şavşat is small (population about 6,000) and has few amenities.

== Climate ==
The climate in Şavşat is a mild/cool summer subtype (Köppen: Dfb) of the humid continental climate.

Climate data for Şavşat
| Month | Jan | Feb | Mar | Apr | May | Jun | Jul | Aug | Sep | Oct | Nov | Dec | Year |
|---|---|---|---|---|---|---|---|---|---|---|---|---|---|
| Daily mean °C (°F) | −3.6 (25.5) | −1.9 (28.6) | 2.6 (36.7) | 8.6 (47.5) | 12.9 (55.2) | 16.0 (60.8) | 19.4 (66.9) | 19.3 (66.7) | 15.8 (60.4) | 10.4 (50.7) | 4.6 (40.3) | −0.8 (30.6) | 8.6 (47.5) |
| Average precipitation mm (inches) | 45 (1.8) | 42 (1.7) | 37 (1.5) | 56 (2.2) | 71 (2.8) | 78 (3.1) | 51 (2.0) | 49 (1.9) | 49 (1.9) | 61 (2.4) | 57 (2.2) | 57 (2.2) | 653 (25.7) |
Source: Climate-Data.org

== Places of interest ==
- Papart forest
- Qenciyan Hill, overlooks the border
- Şavşat Karagöl lake, a large trout lake in the forest, and the crater lake of Kuyruklu.
- Şavşat Castle
- Satle Fortress, also known as Shavsheti Fortress, (Turkish: Şavşat) is a monument of Georgian architecture located above the town of Şavşat.
