= Düzenli, Şavşat =

Düzenli
- Village
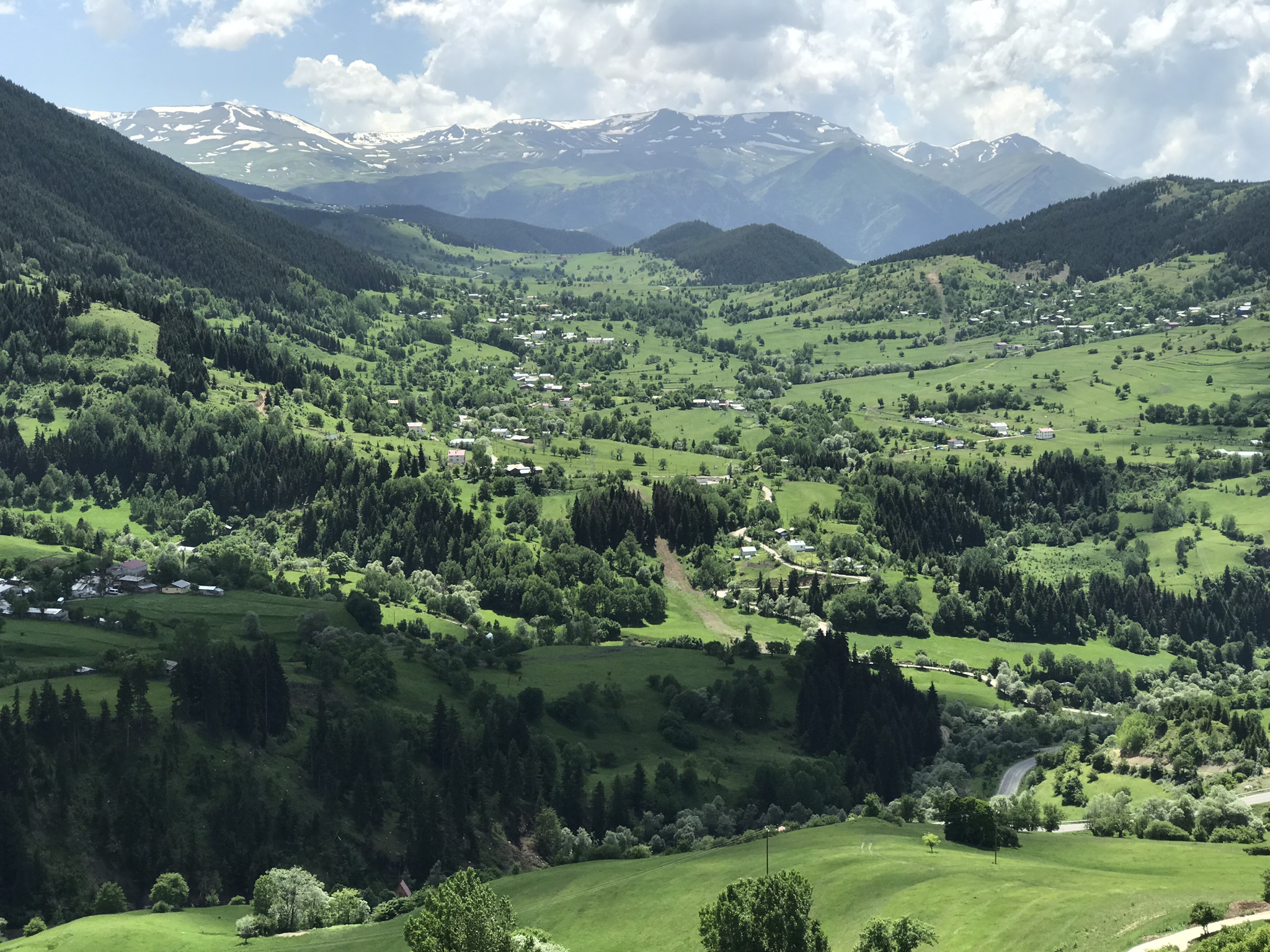
- View over Düzenli and Yavuzköy

- Location within Turkey
- Coordinates: 41.2176°N 42.3710°E
- Country: Turkey
- Province: Artvin
- District: Şavşat
- Population (2021): 148
- Time zone: UTC+3 (TRT)

Düzenli is a village in the Şavşat District, Artvin Province, Turkey. Its population is 148 (2021).
