= Şenocak, Şavşat =

Şenocak
- Village
- Location within Turkey
- Coordinates: 41.3237°N 42.2864°E
- Country: Turkey
- Province: Artvin
- District: Şavşat
- Population (2021): 73
- Time zone: UTC+3 (TRT)

Şenocak is a village in the Şavşat District, Artvin Province, Turkey. Its population is 73 (2021).
