= Yamaçlı, Şavşat =

Yamaçlı
- Village
- Location within Turkey
- Coordinates: 41°22′14″N 42°28′11″E
- Country: Turkey
- Province: Artvin
- District: Şavşat
- Population (2021): 79
- Time zone: UTC+3 (TRT)

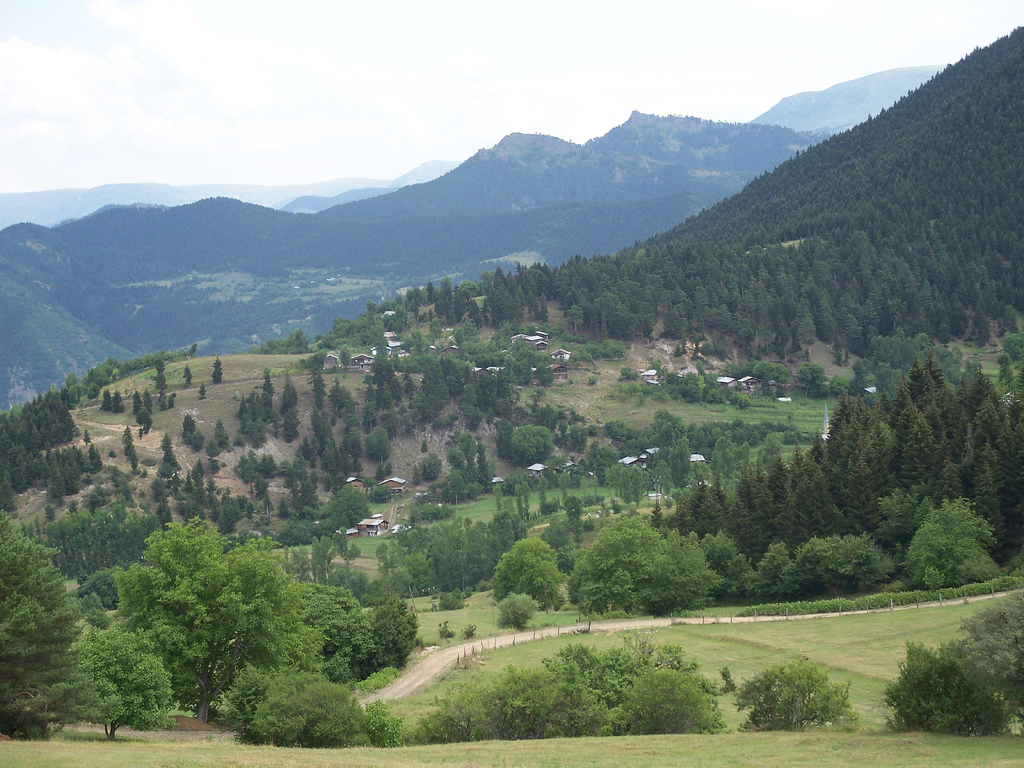
Yamaçlı village, 2007

Yamaçlı is a village in the Şavşat District, Artvin Province, Turkey. Its population is 79 (2021).
