= Çavdarlı, Şavşat =

Çavdarlı
- Village
- Location within Turkey
- Country: Turkey
- Province: Artvin
- District: Şavşat
- Population (2021): 99
- Time zone: UTC+3 (TRT)

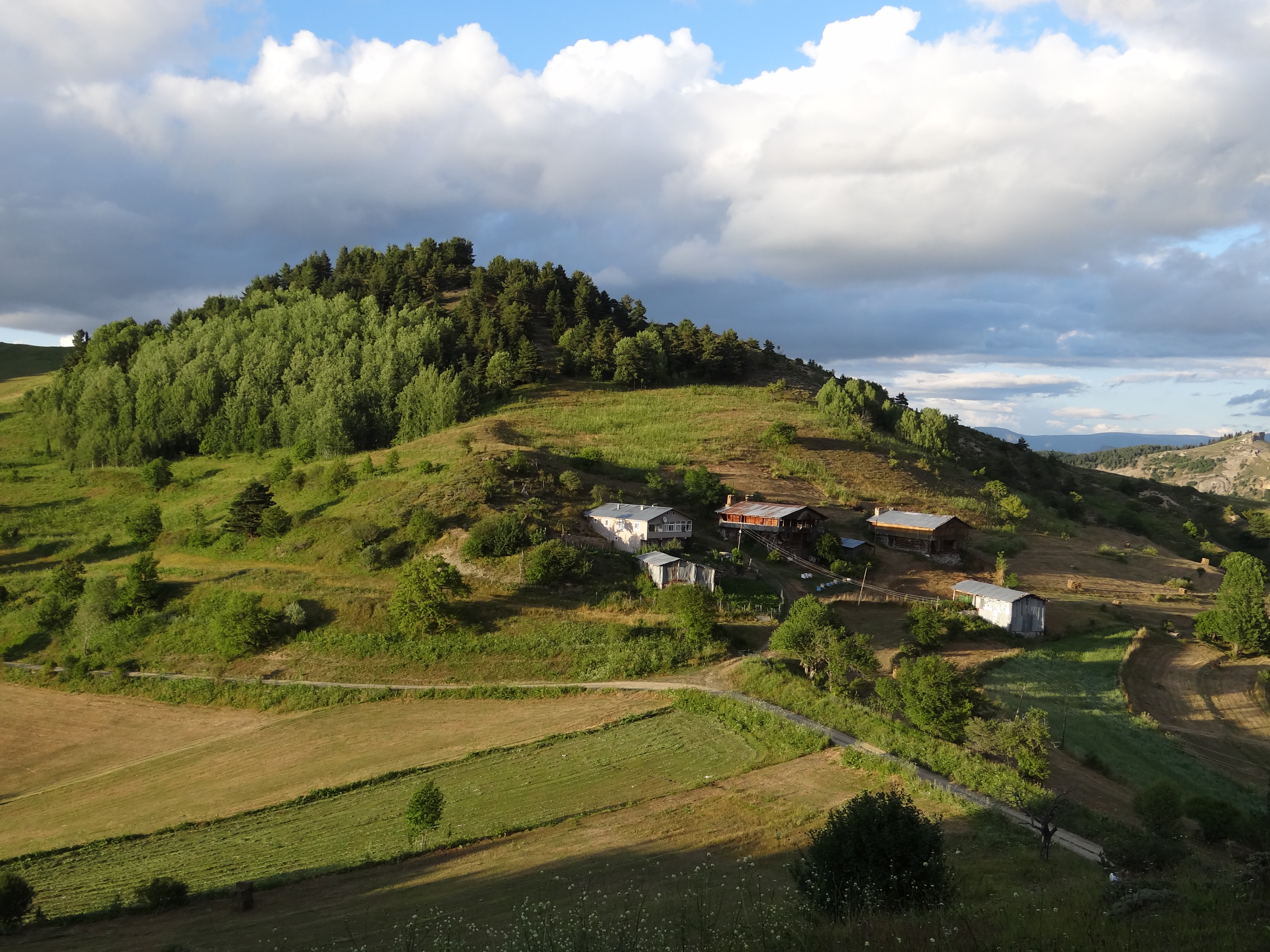
A picture of Çavdarlı

Çavdarlı is a village in the Şavşat District, Artvin Province, Turkey. Its population is 99 (2021).
