= Küplüce, Şavşat =

Küplüce
- Village
- Location within Turkey
- Coordinates: 41.2967°N 42.2586°E
- Country: Turkey
- Province: Artvin
- District: Şavşat
- Population (2021): 153
- Time zone: UTC+3 (TRT)

Küplüce is a village in the Şavşat District, Artvin Province, Turkey. Its population is 153 (2021).
