= Meydancık, Şavşat =

Meydancık
- Village
- Location within Turkey
- Coordinates: 41°24′42″N 42°14′50″E
- Country: Turkey
- Province: Artvin
- District: Şavşat
- Population (2021): 382
- Time zone: UTC+3 (TRT)

Meydancık (original Georgian name დიობანი, Diobani) is a village in Imerkhevi in Şavşat District, Artvin Province, Turkey. Its population is 382 (2021). Before the 2013 reorganisation, it was a town (belde). Meydancık is the official name given by Turkish authorities in 1925, it literally means "the small square / field".

== Name ==
The former name of Meydancık village was Diobani. The toponym is Georgian in origin (დიობანი) and means "large place". In Turkish the name entered as Diyoban. The 1835 Ottoman population register and a 1927 source on Artvin vilayet both record the village as Diyoban (دییوبان).

Meydancık is also a name of vicinity which includes thirteen villages:

- Maden (Badzgireti)
- Demirci (Daba)
- Dereiçi (Dasamoba)
- Erikli (Agara)
- Çukur (Chikhori)
- Sebzeli (Jvariskhevi)
- Çağlayan (Khevtsvirili)
- Çağlıpınar (Khokhlevi)
- Yeşilce (Manatba)
- Oba (Ube)
- Dutlu (Surevani)
- Yağlı (Zakieti)
- Tepebaşı (Ziosi)

== History ==
Diobani was one of the villages of Şavşat, a region in southwestern historical Georgia. The Ottomans took this area from the Georgians in the mid-16th century. The village, a Georgian settlement, was recorded as Georgian in both the 1886 and 1922 population counts.

In the 1835 Ottoman register of Muslim male population, Diyoban was recorded as one of the villages of the İmerhev area of Çıldır District. The register, compiled for tax and conscription purposes, lists 127 men in 44 households; assuming an equal number of women, the total population can be estimated at 254.

Following the Russo-Turkish War (1877–1878) and the Treaty of Berlin (1878), the village was ceded by the Ottomans to the Russian Empire, which registered it as Dioban (Диобанъ). It became part of the Şavşet-İmerhevi subdistrict of Artvin Okrug. In 1886 the population was 527, all Georgians, living in 72 households. The settlement then consisted of six hamlets: Abnadze, Zialidze, Zikrieti, Koklidze, Kumaşidze, and Çir-ogli (Çiradze). Georgian historian Zakaria Çiçinadze visited Şavşeti in the 1890s and counted Diobani among the Georgian-speaking villages of the İmerhev region, noting the remains of a church on a nearby hill. He also recorded that 20 households had emigrated to Ottoman territory before the 1886 census.

During World War I, after the Russian withdrawal, Diobani became part of the Democratic Republic of Georgia. By the Treaty of Moscow (1920) Soviet Russia recognized Artvin, including Diobani, as Georgian territory, but following the Red Army invasion of Georgia and the Treaty of Moscow (1921) it was ceded to Turkey.

In the 1922 census conducted in Artvin liva, Diyoban was recorded as a village of the İmerhev subdistrict of Şavşat, with 699 residents in 103 households, all listed as Georgian. Because the name Diobani/Diyoban was not Turkish, it was changed in 1925 to Meydancık. In the 1940 general census Meydancık was listed in Çoruh Province's Şavşat district, with a population of 1,065. By 1965 it had grown to 1,301, with 580 literates recorded. At that time Meydancık was the center of a subdistrict of the same name, which included 14 villages with a combined population of 10,039.

In 1993 Meydancık (Diobani) was merged with the nearby villages of Balıklı (Tzkalsimeri), Mısırlı (İveti), and Taşköprü (İphrevi) to form the municipality of Meydancık. The municipality was dissolved in 2013 and Meydancık reverted to village status.

A church is known to have existed at Meydancık. In the former hamlet of Koklieti, now part of the village, ruins of a rectangular church survive. When cultural historian Nikolay Marr visited in 1904 he noted that a walnut tree had grown in the middle of the ruined structure.

== Geography ==
Meydancık village is 98 km from Artvin city center and 33 km from Şavşat.

== Population ==
Population by year
2020	391
2019	404
2018	490
2017	498
2016	540
2015	554
2014	520
2013	1,278
2012	1,184
2011	1,378
2010	1,229
2009	1,199
2008	1,060
2007	1,174
2000	2,059
1990	2,412
