= Kayadibi, Şavşat =

Kayadibi
- Village
- Location within Turkey
- Coordinates: 41.3217°N 42.3536°E
- Country: Turkey
- Province: Artvin
- District: Şavşat
- Population (2021): 267
- Time zone: UTC+3 (TRT)

Kayadibi is a village in the Şavşat District, Artvin Province, Turkey. Its population is 267 (2021).
