= Şavşat District =

District of Artvin Province, Turkey

- District
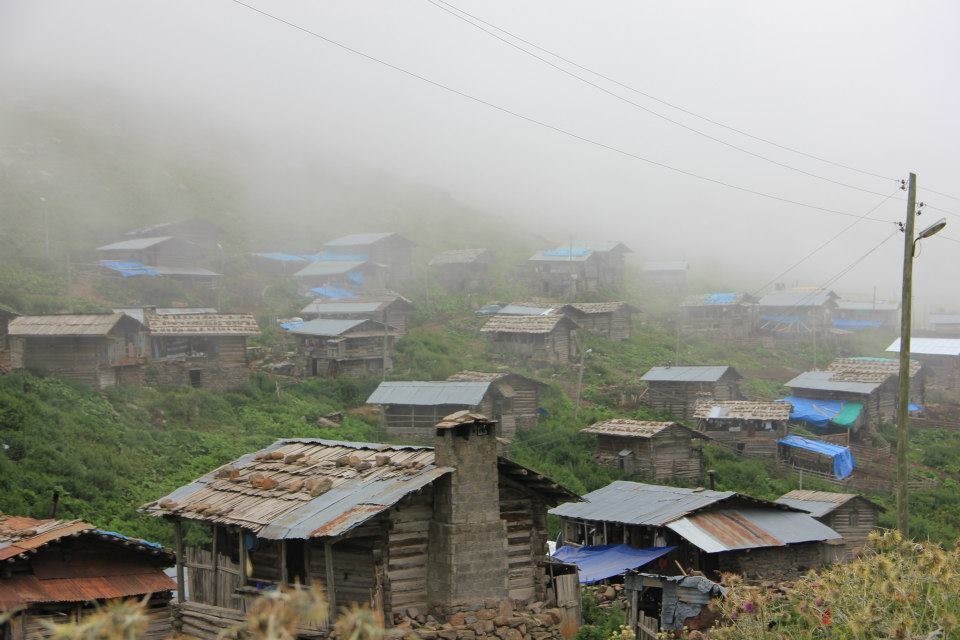
- yayla, Şavşat

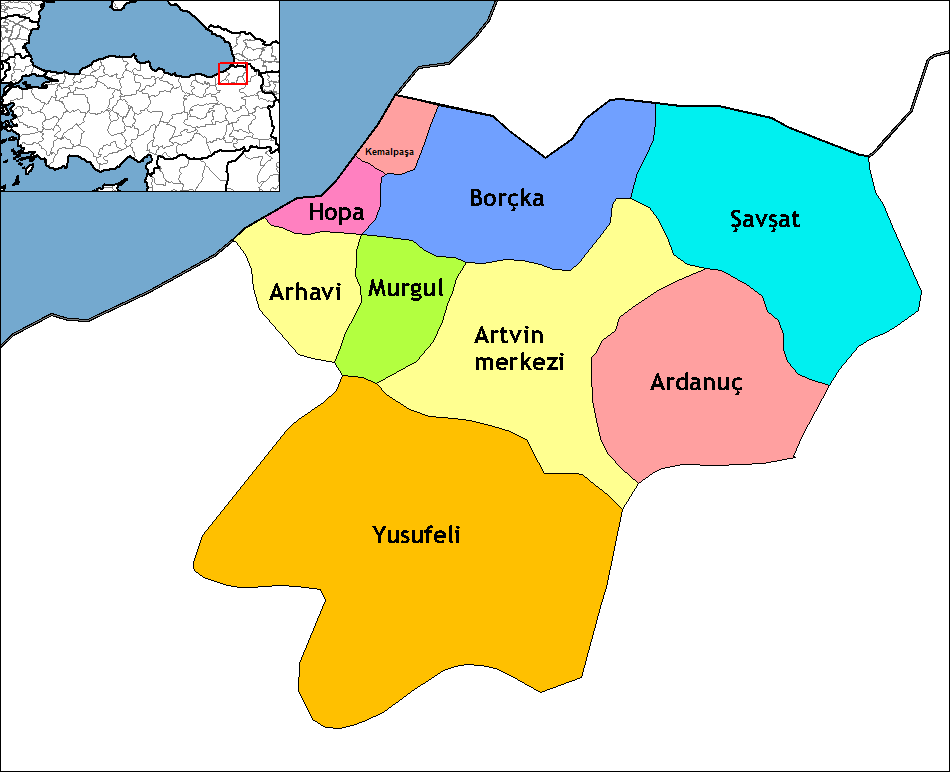
- Map showing Şavşat District in Artvin Province

- Location within Turkey
- Coordinates: 41°15′N 42°22′E
- Country: Turkey
- Province: Artvin
- Seat: Şavşat

Government
  - Kaymakam: Yusuf Akın
- Area: 1,316 km^{2} (508 sq mi)
- Population (2021): 16,975
  - Density: 12.90/km^{2} (33.41/sq mi)
- Time zone: UTC+3 (TRT)
- Website: www.savsat.gov.tr

Şavşat District is a district of Artvin Province of Turkey. Its seat is the town Şavşat. Its area is 1,316 km^{2}, and its population is 16,975 (2021).

== Composition ==
There is one municipality in Şavşat District:

- Şavşat

There are 65 villages in Şavşat District:

- Akdamla
- Arpalı
- Aşağıkoyunlu
- Atalar
- Balıklı
- Çağlıpınar
- Çağlıyan
- Çamlıca
- Çavdarlı
- Çayağzı
- Çermik
- Cevizli
- Çiftlik
- Ciritdüzü
- Çoraklı
- Çukur
- Dalkırmaz
- Demirci
- Demirkapı
- Dereiçi
- Dutlu
- Düzenli
- Elmalı
- Erikli
- Eskikale
- Hanlı
- Ilıca
- Karaağaç
- Karaköy
- Kayabaşı
- Kayadibi
- Kirazlı
- Kireçli
- Kocabey
- Köprülü
- Köprüyaka
- Küplüce
- Kurudere
- Maden
- Meşeli
- Meydancık
- Mısırlı
- Oba
- Otluca
- Pınarlı
- Şalcı
- Savaş
- Saylıca
- Sebzeli
- Şenköy
- Şenocak
- Susuz
- Taşköprü
- Tepebaşı
- Tepeköy
- Üzümlü
- Veliköy
- Yağlı
- Yamaçlı
- Yaşar
- Yavuzköy
- Yeşilce
- Yoncalı
- Yukarıkoyunlu
- Ziyaret
