= Kireçli, Şavşat =

Kireçli
- Village
- Location within Turkey
- Coordinates: 41.2194°N 42.3544°E
- Country: Turkey
- Province: Artvin
- District: Şavşat
- Population (2021): 333
- Time zone: UTC+3 (TRT)

Kireçli is a village in the Şavşat District, Artvin Province, Turkey. Its population is 333 (2021).
