= Eskikale, Şavşat =

Eskikale
- Village
- Location within Turkey
- Coordinates: 41.2833°N 42.1833°E
- Country: Turkey
- Province: Artvin
- District: Şavşat
- Population (2021): 374
- Time zone: UTC+3 (TRT)

Eskikale is a village in the Şavşat District, Artvin Province, Turkey. Its population is 374 (2021).
