= Demirkapı, Şavşat =

Demirkapı
- Village
- Location within Turkey
- Coordinates: 41.4264°N 42.4391°E
- Country: Turkey
- Province: Artvin
- District: Şavşat
- Population (2021): 39
- Time zone: UTC+3 (TRT)

Demirkapı is a village in the Şavşat District, Artvin Province, Turkey. Its population is 39 (2021).
