= Ilıca, Şavşat =

Ilıca
- Village
- Location within Turkey
- Coordinates: 41.4223°N 42.4168°E
- Country: Turkey
- Province: Artvin
- District: Şavşat
- Population (2021): 178
- Time zone: UTC+3 (TRT)

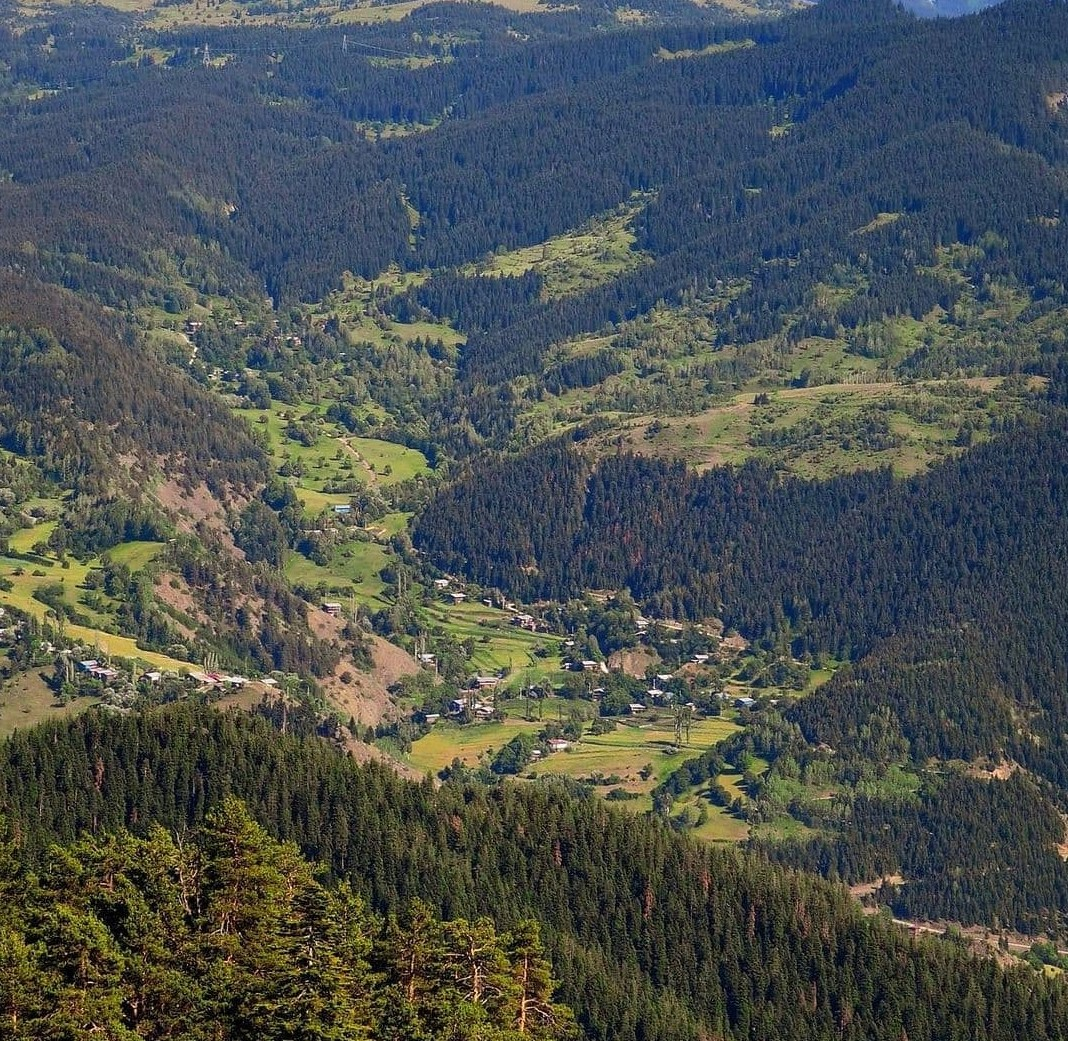
Aerial view of Ilıca

Ilıca is a village in the Şavşat District, Artvin Province, Turkey. Its population is 178 (2021).
