= Kocabey, Şavşat =

Kocabey
- Village
- Location within Turkey
- Coordinates: 41.2557°N 42.4240°E
- Country: Turkey
- Province: Artvin
- District: Şavşat
- Population (2021): 392
- Time zone: UTC+3 (TRT)

Kocabey is a village in the Şavşat District, Artvin Province, Turkey. Its population is 392 (2021).
