= Sebzeli, Şavşat =

Sebzeli
- Village
- Location within Turkey
- Coordinates: 41°21′N 42°17′E
- Country: Turkey
- Province: Artvin
- District: Şavşat
- Population (2021): 93
- Time zone: UTC+3 (TRT)

Sebzeli is a village in the Şavşat District, Artvin Province, Turkey. Its population is 93 (2021).
