= Oba, Şavşat =

Oba
- Village
- Location within Turkey
- Coordinates: 41.3813°N 42.2369°E
- Country: Turkey
- Province: Artvin
- District: Şavşat
- Population (2021): 90
- Time zone: UTC+3 (TRT)

Oba is a village in the Şavşat District, Artvin Province, Turkey. Its population is 90 (2021).
