= Çukur, Şavşat =

Çukur
- Village
- Location within Turkey
- Coordinates: 41.3096°N 42.1966°E
- Country: Turkey
- Province: Artvin
- District: Şavşat
- Population (2021): 244
- Time zone: UTC+3 (TRT)

Çukur is a village in the Şavşat District, Artvin Province, Turkey. Its population is 244 (2021).
