= Yağlı, Şavşat =

Yağlı
- Village
- Location within Turkey
- Coordinates: 41.3859°N 42.1826°E
- Country: Turkey
- Province: Artvin
- District: Şavşat
- Population (2021): 74
- Time zone: UTC+3 (TRT)

Yağlı is a village in the Şavşat District, Artvin Province, Turkey. Its population is 74 (2021).
