= Dutlu, Şavşat =

Dutlu
- Village
- Location within Turkey
- Coordinates: 41.3708°N 42.2507°E
- Country: Turkey
- Province: Artvin
- District: Şavşat
- Population (2021): 211
- Time zone: UTC+3 (TRT)

Dutlu is a village in the Şavşat District, Artvin Province, Turkey. Its population is 211 (2021).
