= Tepebaşı, Şavşat =

Tepebaşı
- Village
- Location within Turkey
- Coordinates: 41.3698°N 42.2069°E
- Country: Turkey
- Province: Artvin
- District: Şavşat
- Population (2021): 85
- Time zone: UTC+3 (TRT)

Tepebaşı is a village in the Şavşat District, Artvin Province, Turkey. Its population is 85 (2021).
