= Erikli, Şavşat =

Erikli
- Village
- Location within Turkey
- Coordinates: 41.4346°N 42.2802°E
- Country: Turkey
- Province: Artvin
- District: Şavşat
- Population (2021): 152
- Time zone: UTC+3 (TRT)

Erikli is a village in the Şavşat District, Artvin Province, Turkey. Its population is 152 (2021).
