= Yeşilce, Şavşat =

Village in the Artvin Province of Turkey

Yeşilce
- Village
- Location within Turkey
- Coordinates: 41.4026°N 42.3195°E
- Country: Turkey
- Province: Artvin
- District: Şavşat
- Population (2021): 79
- Time zone: UTC+3 (TRT)

Yeşilce is a village in the Şavşat District, Artvin Province, Turkey. Its population is 79 (2021).
