= Dereiçi, Şavşat =

Dereiçi
- Village
- Location within Turkey
- Coordinates: 41°19′36″N 42°14′12″E
- Country: Turkey
- Province: Artvin
- District: Şavşat
- Population (2021): 155
- Time zone: UTC+3 (TRT)

Dereiçi is a village in the Şavşat District, Artvin Province, Turkey. Its population is 155 (2021).
