= Dragon Creek =

Creek in the country of Canada

Coordinates: 53°6′59″N 121°45′10″W

Dragon Creek is a creek located in the Cariboo region of British Columbia. The creek was discovered in the 1860s by a Frenchman nicknamed The Dragon because of his fighting abilities. The creek has been mined using drifting, sluicing, hydraulicking and drilling.
