= Demirci, Şavşat =

Demirci
- Village
- Location within Turkey
- Coordinates: 41.3814°N 42.2009°E
- Country: Turkey
- Province: Artvin
- District: Şavşat
- Population (2021): 58
- Time zone: UTC+3 (TRT)

Demirci is a village in the Şavşat District, Artvin Province, Turkey. Its population is 58 (2021).
