= Adjarians =

Ethnographic group of Georgians

აჭარლები, Ačarlebi
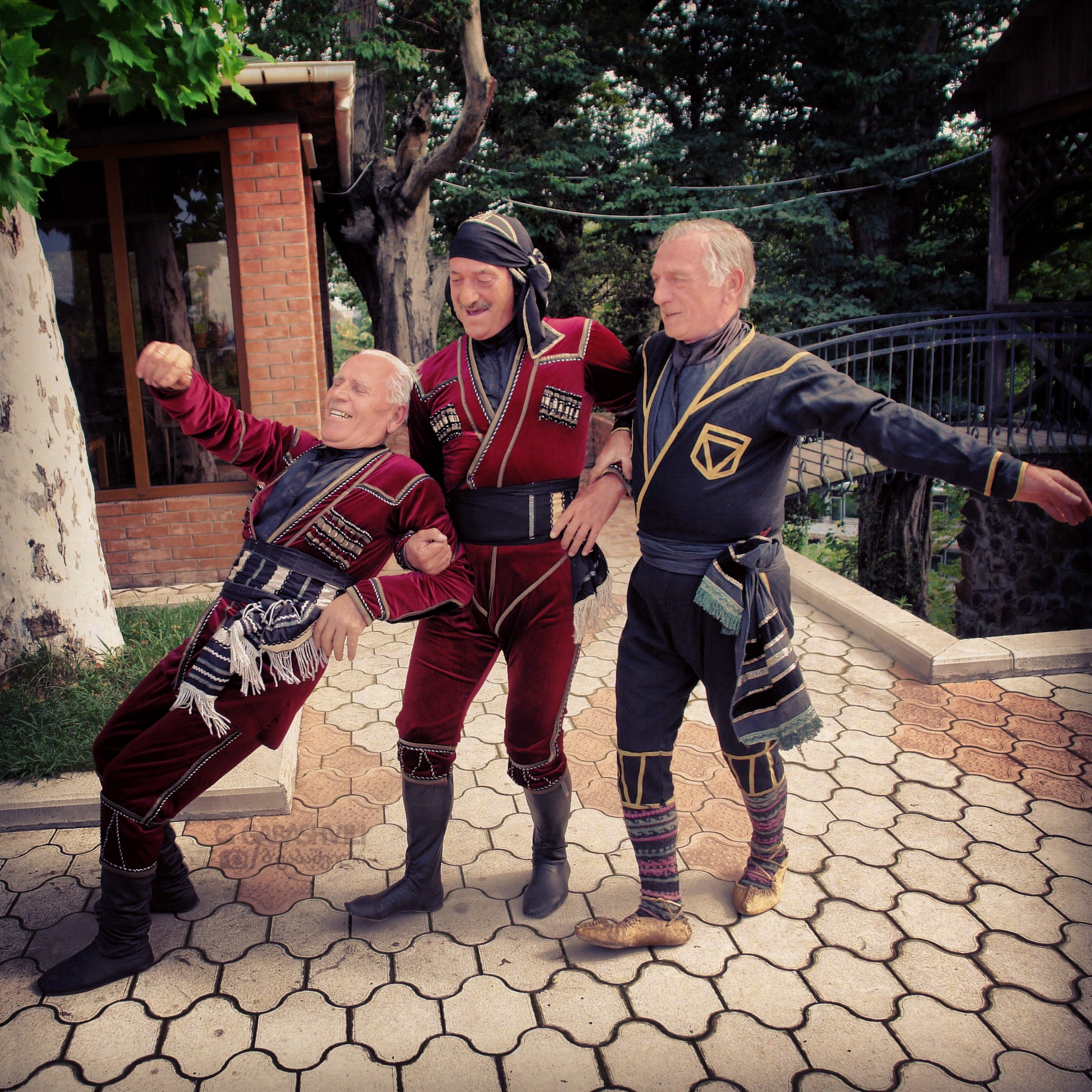
- Adjarians dancing

Regions with significant populations
- Georgia (mainly Adjara), Turkey

Languages
- Adjaran dialect of the Georgian language.

Religion
- Majority Orthodox Christian, minority Sunni Muslim and etc. (Note: Adjara region (2024 census): 59.54% Orthodox Christianity 33.85% Islam 5.43% Others)

The Adjarians (Georgian: აჭარლები, romanized: ach'arlebi), (Note: Also spelled Adjars, Adjarans, Achars, Acharans, Acharians, Ajars, Ajarians, Adzhars, etc.) are an ethnographic group of Georgians indigenous to Adjara in southwestern Georgia. Adjarian settlements are also found in the Georgian provinces of Guria, Kvemo Kartli, and Kakheti, as well as in several areas of neighbouring Turkey.

Under the lengthy Ottoman rule, which actively favored Muslims over Christians, many Adjarians converted to Islam; however, most of them have since reverted back to Christianity following their reunification with the Georgian mainland. Despite an extended period under Turkish rule, Adjarians have kept the Georgian language (with their own dialect) and traditions. In the 1926 census, Adjarians were categorised as a distinct ethnic group. In the 1939 census, they were included in the same category as Georgians. Since Georgian independence, most Adjarians consider themselves Georgians, but some segments of the Georgian society continue to view Muslim Adjarians as second-class "Turkicized" Georgians.

== History ==
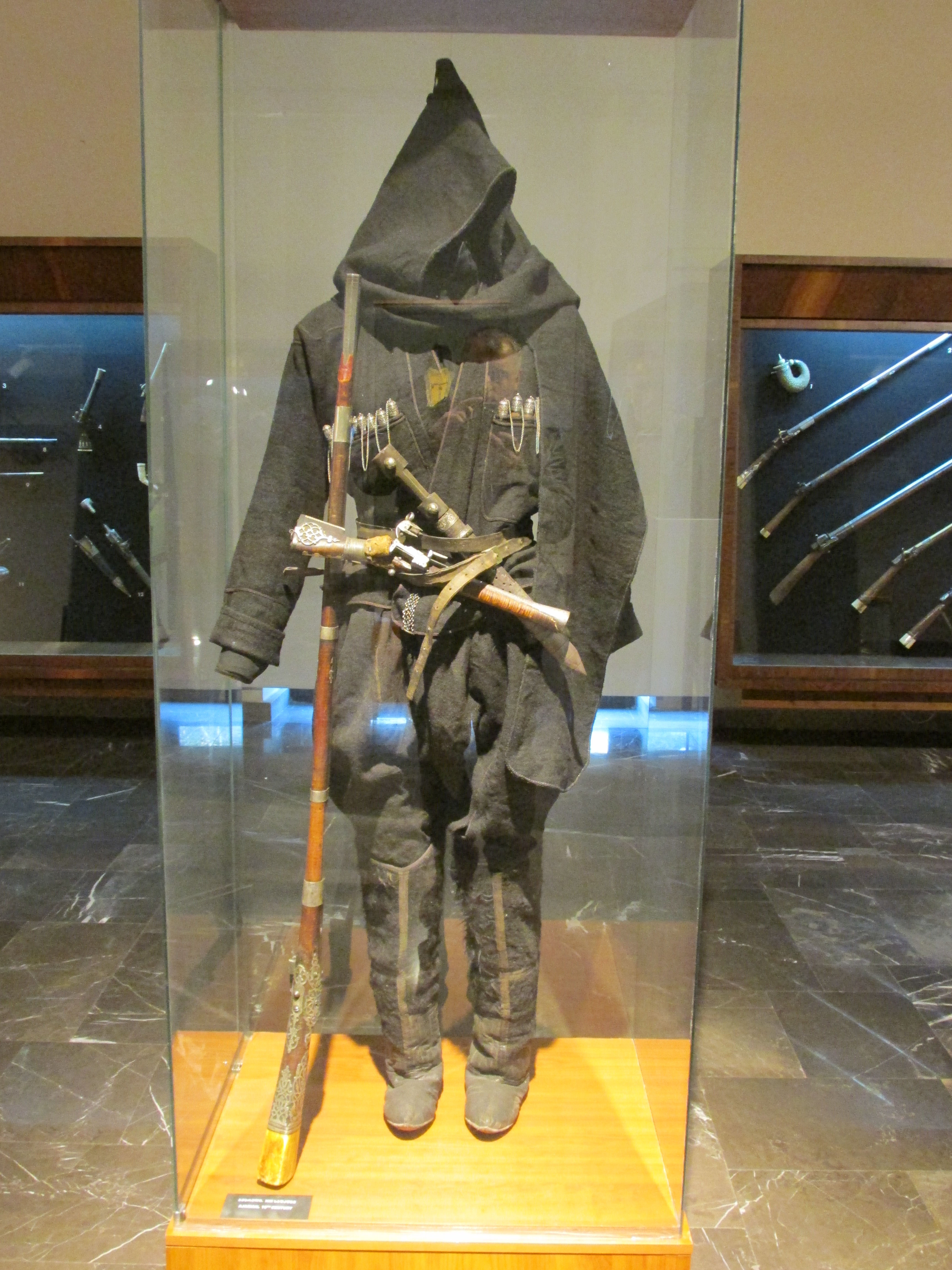
Historical Adjarian men's clothing and weapons.

Adjarians, like other ethnographic groups of Georgians, have historically followed Christianity. However, in the course of the 200 years of Ottoman rule, which pursued discriminatory policies against Christians, Adjarians gradually converted to Islam. The nobility converted first. Adjarians were fully Islamized by the end of the eighteenth century.

During the 1853–1856 Crimean War and the 1877–1878 Russo-Turkish War, as other Ottoman subjects many Adjarians fought on the side of the Turks. The Ottomans were forced to cede Adjara to the expanding Russian Empire in 1878 under the Treaty of Berlin. Russian authorities initially promoted emigration, allowing Muslims to sell their property and leave the country, as a result of which many Muslims moved to the Ottoman Empire. However, Russian authorities then tried to win the loyalty of local Muslims by building mosques and madrassas, reasoning that it was better to operate these religious establishments under strict supervision of the state, while prohibiting locals from studying in Muslim countries. As a result, many muhacir came back to Adjara.

Adjara became part of the independent Georgian Democratic Republic in 1918. However, in April 1918, the Ottoman Empire invaded Georgia and captured Batumi. On 4 June 1918, the Treaty of Batum was signed, under which Georgia was forced to cede Adjara to the Ottoman Empire. However, due to the Ottoman defeat in the First World War and the Treaty of Mudros, the Ottomans soon withdrew from the territory, and Adjara fell under the temporary occupation of Great Britain. During this time, under the leadership of prominent Adjarian activist Memed Abashidze, the Congress of the Representatives of Muslim Georgians was held on 31 August 1919. It passed a resolution supporting reunification with Georgia and elected Majlis of Georgian Muslims, which represented Muslim Georgians in relation to the British administration.

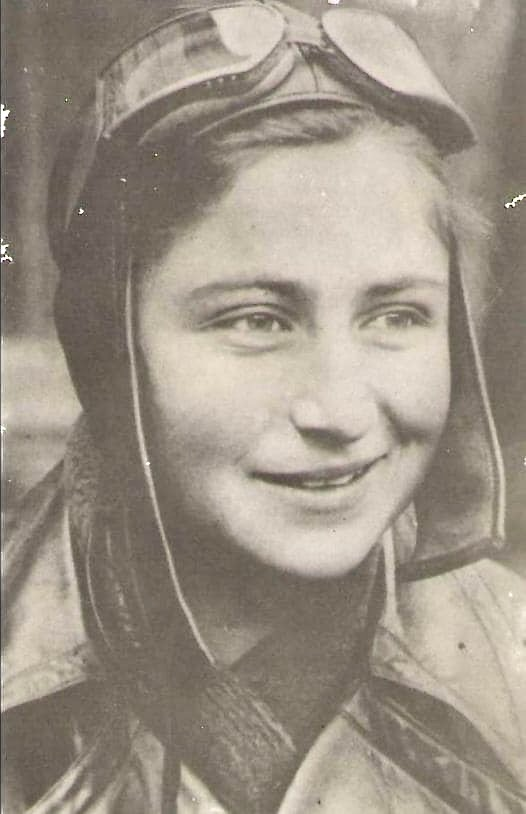
Fadiko Gogitidze, a Adjarian female aviator

The British administration ceded Adjara to the Democratic Republic of Georgia on July 20, 1920. It was granted autonomy under the Georgian constitution adopted in February 1921 when the Red Army invaded Georgia. Achara joined the territory of Soviet Georgia under the 1921 Treaty of Kars, between the Ottoman Empire and the USSR. The treaty required that Achara would have "administrative autonomy and the right to develop its own culture, its own religion, and its own agrarian regime". However, the Soviet atheist ideology dampened religious practice in the region, thus diminishing the Adjarian legitimation for autonomy within the Soviet system. In the 1920s, the Achars rebelled against the Soviet anti-Islamic activities and collectivization reforms. The armed uprising began in the mountainous regions of Adjara in April 1929. Soviet troops were deployed in response and swiftly quelled the revolt.

The Georgian population of Adjara had been generally known as Muslim Georgians until the 1926 Soviet census listed them as Adjarians, separate from the rest of Georgians, counting 71,426 of them. In subsequent Soviet censuses, they were listed with other Georgians, and the question of religion was completely dropped from Soviet censuses after 1937.

There was a resurgence of the Adjarian religious identity during the dissolution of the USSR. Islamic religious practice became the cultural norm, madrassas reopened and the call to prayer sounded from mosques. Local leader Aslan Abashidze leveraged the ongoing Islamic revival to advance his political goals. After the Georgian independence, the first Georgian president Zviad Gamsakhurdia appointed Abashidze as the chairman of Ajaria's parliament in 1991. Taking advantage of the turmoil caused by the Georgian Civil War, War in Abkhazia and South Ossetia, he unilaterally took power without formal agreement and started to withhold tax revenue and capture Adjara's considerable wealth. The Head Mufti of Achara, Haji Mahmud Kamashidze, supported Abashidze in his power struggle. However, after Abashidze reached his goals, he stopped using the Muslim movement for his political goals. The 2004 Adjara crisis led to Aslan Abashidze stepping down from his post after thousands of Adjarians protested against his rule in Batumi in May 2004, with Georgian President Mikheil Saakashvili symbolically proclaiming "Abashidze has fled, Adjara is free".

== Religion ==
In the sixteenth century, the majority of Adjara's population was Christian. By the end of the eighteenth century, the majority of Adjarians were Muslim. After Adjara was ceded to the Russian Empire in 1878 under the Treaty of Berlin, Adjarians, who were Muslims, were allowed to leave for Turkey. This was followed by an influx of Christians from Kakheti, resulting in a change of the religious landscape.

While the Russian authorities supported the Russian Orthodox Church's missionary efforts, they also tried to win the loyalty of Adjarians by building mosques and madrassas and supporting the local Muslim clergy. As a result, some Adjarians emigrants, called Muhacir, came back to Adjara.

The collapse of the Soviet Union and Georgian independence led to renewed interest in religion, including Islam. There was a new push for Christianization of remaining Muslim Adjarians, especially among the youth, during the government of Zviad Gamsakhurdia.

According to the 2014 census, 54.5% of Adjarians are Orthodox Christian. In select municipalities, Muslims make up the majority, with 94.6% of the population in Khulo Municipality, 74.4% in Shuakhevi Municipality, 62.1% in Keda Municipality and 56.3% in Khelvachauri Municipality. In Batumi and Kobuleti Municipality Muslims make up a minority with 25.4% and 28.8%.

== Language ==
Adjarians speak Adjarian, a Georgian dialect related to the one spoken in the neighboring northern province of Guria, but with a number of Turkish loanwords. Adjarian also possesses many features in common with the Zan languages (Mingrelian and Laz), which are sisters to Georgian and are included in the Kartvelian language group.

== See also ==
- Chveneburi, ethnic Georgians in Turkey many of whom are of Adjarian heritage
- Laz people, Kartvelian-speaking ethnic subgroup of Georgians

== Sources ==
- George, Julie A. (2009). The Politics of Ethnic Separatism in Russia and Georgia. Palgrave Macmillan. doi:10.1057/9780230102323. ISBN 978-0-230-61359-1.
- Hoch, Tomáš; Kopeček, Vincent (2011). "Transforming Identity of Ajarian Population". ALPPI Annual of Language & Politics and Politics of Identity. V (5): 57–72. ISSN 1803-1757.
- Sanikidze, George (1 April 2018). "Muslim Communities of Georgia: Old Problems and New Challenges". Islamophobia Studies Journal. 4 (2): 247–265. doi:10.13169/islastudj.4.2.0247. ISSN 2325-8381.
