= Çağlıyan, Şavşat =

Çağlıyan
- Village
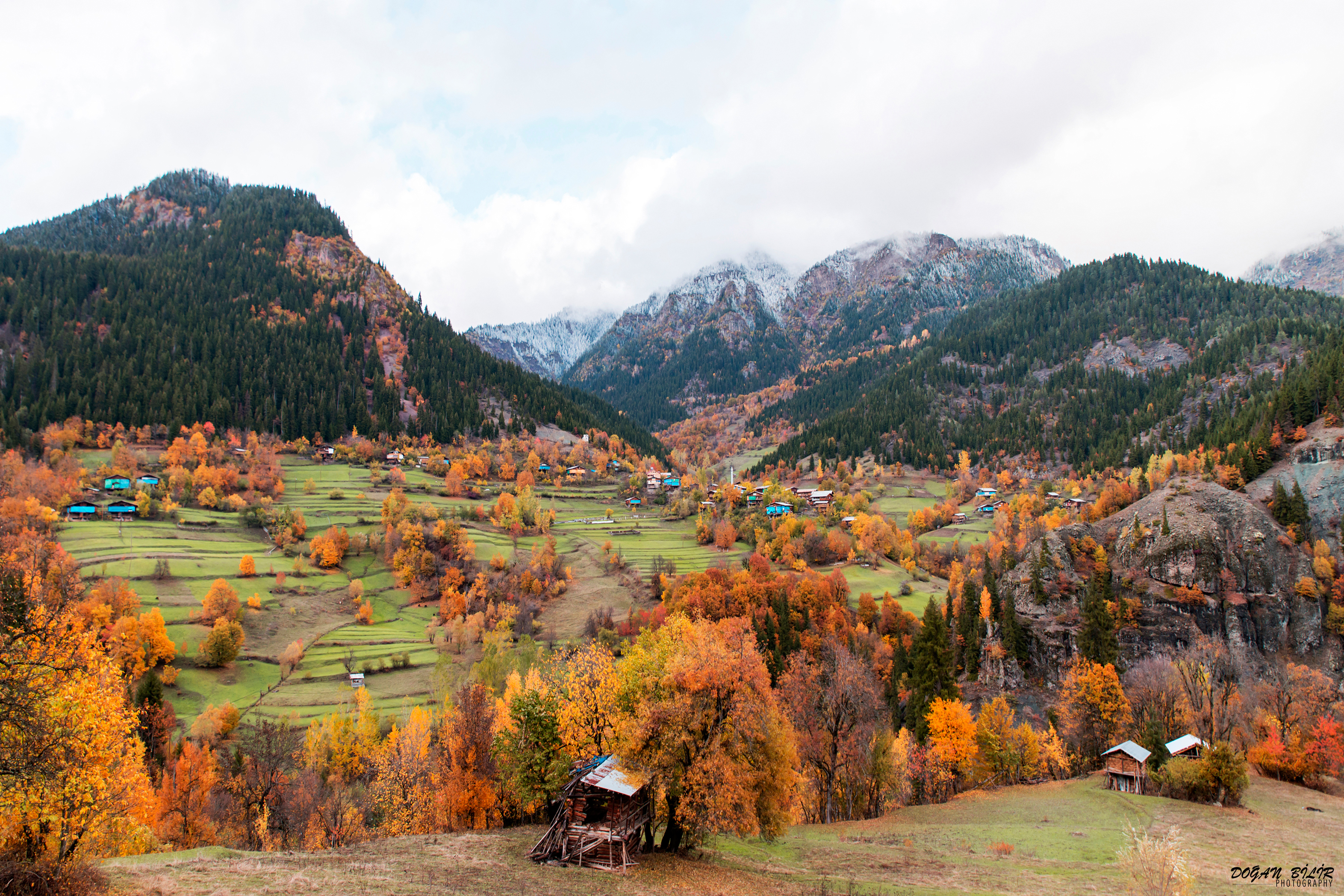

- Location within Turkey
- Coordinates: 41.399°N 42.170°E
- Country: Turkey
- Province: Artvin
- District: Şavşat
- Population (2021): 87
- Time zone: UTC+3 (TRT)

Çağlıyan is a village in the Şavşat District, Artvin Province, Turkey. Its population is 87 (2021).
