= Maden, Şavşat =

Maden
- Village
- Location within Turkey
- Coordinates: 41.3809°N 42.1506°E
- Country: Turkey
- Province: Artvin
- District: Şavşat
- Population (2021): 144
- Time zone: UTC+3 (TRT)

Maden is a village in the Şavşat District, Artvin Province, Turkey. Its population is 144 (2021).
