= Çağlıpınar, Şavşat =

Çağlıpınar
- Village
- Location within Turkey
- Coordinates: 41°25′N 42°20′E
- Country: Turkey
- Province: Artvin
- District: Şavşat
- Population (2021): 63
- Time zone: UTC+3 (TRT)

Çağlıpınar is a village in the Şavşat District, Artvin Province, Turkey. Its population is 63 (2021).
