= Adjaran dialect =

One of the Georgian dialects

Adjaran
- Native to: Georgia, Turkey
- Region: Adjara
- Ethnicity: Georgians
- Language family: Kartvelian: Karto-Zan; Georgian; Southwestern; Adjaran
- Dialects: Upper; Lower; Kobuletian

Language codes
- ISO 639-3: –
- Glottolog: adzh1238 Adzhar

The Adjaran dialect is one of the Georgian dialects. It is primarily spoken within the borders of the Autonomous Republic of Adjara, Georgia, in two villages of the adjacent region of Guria and the ethnic Georgian-inhabited areas of Turkey. Adjaran, like Gurian and Imerkhevian, belongs to the Southwestern group of Georgian dialects and is derived from the Meskhet-Klarjetian and surrounding Gurian dialects.

== Subdialects and accents ==
The Adjaran dialect has several subdialects and is spoken with different accents in different locations. Upper Adjaran and Lower Adjaran are the most common subdialects. In addition, a separate Kobuletian dialect is sometimes distinguished as well. The Upper Adjaran subdialect is found in Khulo and Shuakhevi, and the Lower Adjaran subdialect is found in the Keda, Khelvachauri and Kobuleti regions.

Adjaran is spoken with Khuloan, Shuakhevian, Kobuletian accents. The Kobuletian accent shows less evidence of Turkish influence than the other two. Some distinguish between Ghorjomian and Khikhadzirian variants of the Khuloan accent. The Kirnat-Maradid region also has a unique accent.

Georgian dialect map, with Adjaran in light-blue/turquoise

There are western and eastern varieties of Adjaran. The Upper Adjaran subdialect is similar to Meskhet-Javakhian and resembles Iberian. The Lower Adjaran subdialect (particularly the Kobuletian-accented version), is similar to western Georgian speech.

== References and external links ==
- Acharuli dialect
- Qartuli (Acharuli) Zghaprebi, Batumi 1973.
- S. Nizharadze, Acharuli Dialeqti, Batumi 1975.
- P. Jajanidze, Acharuli Leqsikuri Masalebi, qpi Sr., XXIII, 1961.
- T. Pukaradze, Msazghvrel-Sazghvrulis Brunebisatvis Samkhret Saqartvelos Dialeqtebshi, Acharuli Dialeqtis Dargoblivi Leqsika, VI, Tbilisi, 1986.
- AdjaraInfo.Com
