= List of populated places in Artvin Province =

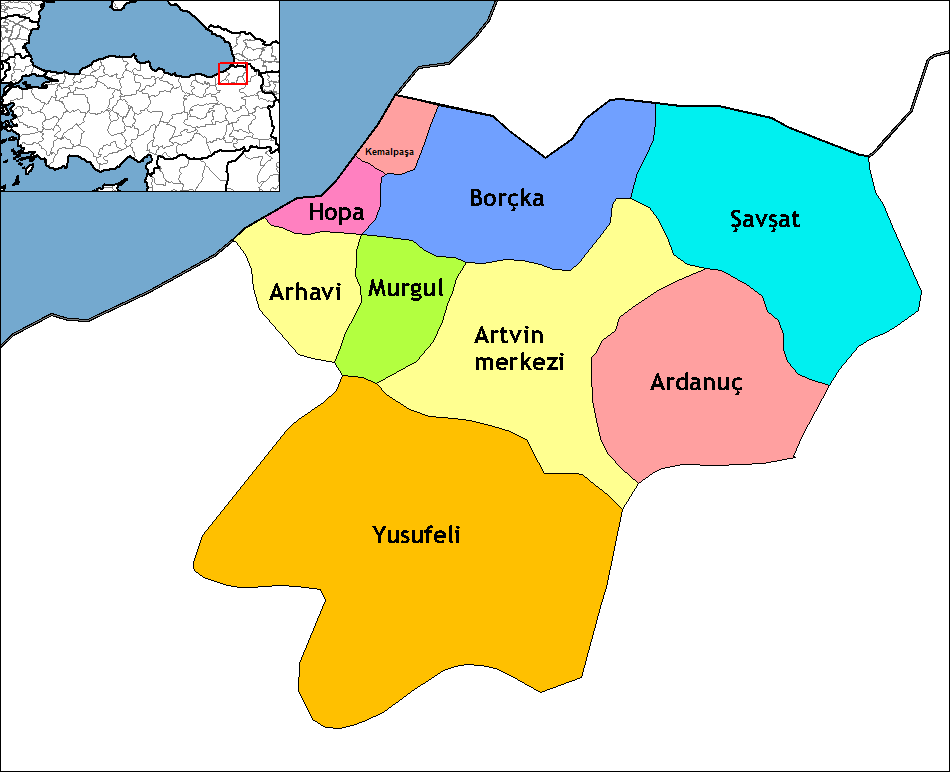
Artvin Province

Below is the list of populated places in Artvin Province, Turkey by the districts. In the following lists, first place in each list is the administrative center of the district.

== Artvin ==
- Artvin
- Ağıllar, Artvin
- Ahlat, Artvin
- Alabalık, Artvin
- Aşağımaden, Artvin
- Bağcılar, Artvin
- Bakırköy, Artvin
- Ballıüzüm, Artvin
- Beşağıl, Artvin
- Çimenli, Artvin
- Derinköy, Artvin
- Dikmenli, Artvin
- Dokuzoğul, Artvin
- Erenler, Artvin
- Fıstıklı, Artvin
- Hamamlı, Artvin
- Hızarlı, Artvin
- Kalburlu, Artvin
- Köseler, Artvin
- Okumuşlar, Artvin
- Ormanlı, Artvin
- Ortaköy, Artvin
- Oruçlu, Artvin
- Pırnallı, Artvin
- Sakalar, Artvin
- Salkımlı, Artvin
- Sarıbudak, Artvin
- Seyitler, Artvin
- Sünbüllü, Artvin
- Şehitlik, Artvin
- Taşlıca, Artvin
- Tütüncüler, Artvin
- Varlık, Artvin
- Vezirköy, Artvin
- Yanıklı, Artvin
- Yukarımaden, Artvin
- Zeytinlik, Artvin

== Ardanuç ==
- Ardanuç
- Akarsu, Ardanuç
- Anaçlı, Ardanuç
- Aşağıırmaklar, Ardanuç
- Aşıklar, Ardanuç
- Avcılar, Ardanuç
- Aydınköy, Ardanuç
- Bağlıca, Ardanuç
- Ballı, Ardanuç
- Beratlı, Ardanuç
- Bereket, Ardanuç
- Boyalı, Ardanuç
- Bulanık, Ardanuç
- Cevizlik, Ardanuç
- Çakıllar, Ardanuç
- Çıralar, Ardanuç
- Ekşinar, Ardanuç
- Ferhatlı, Ardanuç
- Geçitli, Ardanuç
- Gökçe, Ardanuç
- Güleş, Ardanuç
- Gümüşhane, Ardanuç
- Hamurlu, Ardanuç
- Harmanlı, Ardanuç
- Hisarlı, Ardanuç
- İncilli, Ardanuç
- Kapıköy, Ardanuç
- Karlı, Ardanuç
- Kaşıkçı Ardanuç
- Kızılcık, Ardanuç
- Konaklı, Ardanuç
- Kutlu, Ardanuç
- Meşeköy, Ardanuç
- Müezzinler, Ardanuç
- Naldöken, Ardanuç
- Ovacık, Ardanuç
- Örtülü, Ardanuç
- Peynirli, Ardanuç
- Sakarya, Ardanuç
- Soğanlı, Ardanuç
- Tepedüzü, Ardanuç
- Torbalı, Ardanuç
- Tosunlu, Ardanuç
- Tütünlü, Ardanuç
- Ustalar, Ardanuç
- Yaylacık, Ardanuç
- Yolağzı, Ardanuç
- Yolüstü, Ardanuç
- Yukarıırmaklar, Ardanuç
- Zekeriyaköy, Ardanuç

== Arhavi ==
- Arhavi
- Aşağıhacılar, Arhavi
- Aşağışahinler, Arhavi
- Balıklı, Arhavi
- Başköy, Arhavi
- Boyuncuk, Arhavi
- Cumhuriyet, Arhavi
- Derecik, Arhavi
- Dereüstü, Arhavi
- Dikyamaç, Arhavi
- Dülgerli, Arhavi
- Güneşli, Arhavi
- Güngören, Arhavi
- Gürgencik, Arhavi
- Kavak, Arhavi
- Kemerköprü, Arhavi
- Kestanealan, Arhavi
- Kireçlik, Arhavi
- Konaklı, Arhavi
- Küçükköy, Arhavi
- Musazade, Arhavi
- Ortacalar, Arhavi
- Sırtoba, Arhavi
- Soğucak, Arhavi
- Şenköy, Arhavi
- Tepeyurt, Arhavi
- Ulaş, Arhavi
- Ulukent, Arhavi
- Üçırmak, Arhavi
- Üçler, Arhavi
- Yemişlik, Arhavi
- Yıldızlı, Arhavi
- Yolgeçen, Arhavi
- Yukarıhacılar, Arhavi
- Yukarışahinler, Arhavi

== Borçka ==
- Borçka
- Adagül, Borçka
- Akpınar, Borçka
- Alaca, Borçka
- Ambarlı, Borçka
- Aralık, Borçka
- Arkaköy, Borçka
- Atanoğlu, Borçka
- Avcılar, Borçka
- Balcı, Borçka
- Camili, Borçka
- Civan, Borçka
- Çavuşlu, Borçka
- Çaylıköy, Borçka
- Çifteköprü, Borçka
- Demirciler, Borçka
- Düzenli, Borçka
- Düzköy, Borçka
- Efeler, Borçka
- Fındıklı, Borçka
- Güneşli, Borçka
- Güreşen, Borçka
- Güzelyurt, Borçka
- İbrikli, Borçka
- Kale, Borçka
- Karşıköy, Borçka
- Kayadibi, Borçka
- Kayalar, Borçka
- Kaynarca, Borçka
- Küçükköy, Borçka
- Maralköy, Borçka
- Muratlı, Borçka
- Örücüler, Borçka
- Şerefiye, Borçka
- Taraklı, Borçka
- Uğurköy, Borçka
- Yeşilköy, Borçka
- Zorlu, Borçka

== Hopa ==
- Hopa
- Akdere, Hopa
- Balık, Hopa
- Başköy, Hopa
- Başoba, Hopa
- Bucak, Hopa
- Cumhuriyet, Hopa
- Çamlı, Hopa
- Çamurlu, Hopa
- Çavuşlu, Hopa
- Çimenli, Hopa
- Dereiçi, Hopa
- Esenkıyı, Hopa
- Eşmekaya, Hopa
- Gümüşdere, Hopa
- Güneşli, Hopa
- Güvercinli, Hopa
- Hendek, Hopa
- Karaosmaniye, Hopa
- Kaya, Hopa
- Kazimiye, Hopa
- Kemalpaşa, Hopa
- Koyuncular, Hopa
- Köprücü, Hopa
- Kuledibi, Hopa
- Liman, Hopa
- Osmaniye, Hopa
- Pınarlı, Hopa
- Sarp, Hopa
- Selimiye, Hopa
- Subaşı, Hopa
- Sugören, Hopa
- Üçkardeş, Hopa
- Yeşilköy, Hopa
- Yoldere, Hopa

== Murgul ==
- Murgul
- Akantaş, Murgul
- Ardıçlı, Murgul
- Başköy, Murgul
- Çimenli, Murgul
- Damar, Murgul
- Erenköy, Murgul
- Kabaca, Murgul
- Korucular, Murgul
- Küre, Murgul
- Özmal, Murgul
- Petek, Murgul

== Şavşat ==
- Şavşat
- Akdamla, Şavşat
- Arpalı, Şavşat
- Aşağıkoyunlu, Şavşat
- Atalar, Şavşat
- Cevizli, Şavşat
- Ciritdüzü, Şavşat
- Çağlıpınar, Şavşat
- Çağlıyan, Şavşat
- Çamlıca, Şavşat
- Çavdarlı, Şavşat
- Çayağzı, Şavşat
- Çermik, Şavşat
- Çiftlik, Şavşat
- Çoraklı, Şavşat
- Çukur, Şavşat
- Dalkırmaz, Şavşat
- Demirci, Şavşat
- Demirkapı, Şavşat
- Dereiçi, Şavşat
- Dutlu, Şavşat
- Düzenli, Şavşat
- Elmalı, Şavşat
- Erikli, Şavşat
- Eskikale, Şavşat
- Hanlı, Şavşat
- Ilıca, Şavşat
- Karaağaç, Şavşat
- Karaköy, Şavşat
- Kayabaşı, Şavşat
- Kayadibi, Şavşat
- Kirazlı, Şavşat
- Kireçli, Şavşat
- Kocabey, Şavşat
- Köprülü, Şavşat
- Köprüyaka, Şavşat
- Kurudere, Şavşat
- Küplüce, Şavşat
- Maden, Şavşat
- Meşeli, Şavşat
- Meydancık, Şavşat
- Oba, Şavşat
- Otluca, Şavşat
- Pınarlı, Şavşat
- Savaş, Şavşat
- Saylıca, Şavşat
- Sebzeli, Şavşat
- Susuz, Şavşat
- Şalcı, Şavşat
- Şenköy, Şavşat
- Şenocak, Şavşat
- Tepebaşı, Şavşat
- Tepeköy, Şavşat
- Üzümlü, Şavşat
- Veliköy, Şavşat
- Yağlı, Şavşat
- Yamaçlı, Şavşat
- Yaşar, Şavşat
- Yavuzköy, Şavşat
- Yeşilce, Şavşat
- Yoncalı, Şavşat
- Yukarıkoyunlu, Şavşat
- Ziyaret, Şavşat

== Yusufeli ==
- Yusufeli
- Alanbaşı, Yusufeli
- Altıparmak, Yusufeli
- Arpacık, Yusufeli
- Avcılar, Yusufeli
- Bademkaya, Yusufeli
- Bahçeli, Yusufeli
- Bakırtepe, Yusufeli
- Balalan, Yusufeli
- Balcılı, Yusufeli
- Bıçakçılar, Yusufeli
- Bostancı, Yusufeli
- Boyalı, Yusufeli
- Cevizlik, Yusufeli
- Çağlıyan, Yusufeli
- Çamlıca, Yusufeli
- Çeltikdüzü, Yusufeli
- Çevreli, Yusufeli
- Çıralı, Yusufeli
- Dağeteği, Yusufeli
- Darıca, Yusufeli
- Demirdöven, Yusufeli
- Demirkent, Yusufeli
- Demirköy, Yusufeli
- Dereiçi, Yusufeli
- Dokumacılar, Yusufeli
- Erenköy, Yusufeli
- Esendal, Yusufeli
- Esenyaka, Yusufeli
- Gümüşözü, Yusufeli
- Günyayla, Yusufeli
- Havuzlu, Yusufeli
- Irmakyanı, Yusufeli
- İnanlı, Yusufeli
- İşhan, Yusufeli
- Kılıçkaya, Yusufeli
- Kınalıçam, Yusufeli
- Kirazalan, Yusufeli
- Kömürlü, Yusufeli
- Köprügören, Yusufeli
- Küplüce, Yusufeli
- Morkaya, Yusufeli
- Mutlugün, Yusufeli
- Narlık, Yusufeli
- Ormandibi, Yusufeli
- Öğdem, Yusufeli
- Özgüven, Yusufeli
- Pamukçular, Yusufeli
- Sebzeciler, Yusufeli
- Serinsu, Yusufeli
- Sütlüce, Yusufeli
- Tarakçılar, Yusufeli
- Taşkıran, Yusufeli
- Tekkale, Yusufeli
- Yağcılar, Yusufeli
- Yamaçüstü, Yusufeli
- Yarbaşı, Yusufeli
- Yaylalar, Yusufeli
- Yeniköy, Yusufeli
- Yokuşlu, Yusufeli
- Yüksekoba, Yusufeli
- Yüncüler, Yusufeli
- Zeytincik, Yusufeli
