= Sarıgöl, Yusufeli =

Neighbourhood in Yusufeli District, Artvin Province, Turkey

Sarıgöl is a neighbourhood of Taşkıran, a village in Yusufeli District, Artvin Province, Turkey. In addition to being the name of a settlement, Sarıgöl was formerly also the name of a geographical region.

== History ==
Located in the historical region of Tao, Sarıgöl (صارى کول) was a neighbourhood of the village of Zğapor in the Livane Sanjak, according to an 1835 Ottoman population census. The census recorded 27 Muslim males in 13 households in the neighbourhood. The total population can be estimated at approximately twice that number.

Sarıgöl was also the name of a wider region, which was also known as Cilad (Jilad). The name "Cilad" is a corruption of the Georgian name Tchilati (ჭილათი), which derives from the word tchila (ჭილა), meaning rush mat.

In 1958, Sarıgöl was established as a subdistrict (nahiye) within Yusufeli District. The village of Zğapor, which included the neighbourhood of Sarıgöl, became the administrative centre of the subdistrict and was renamed Sarıgöl. The Sarıgöl Subdistrict comprised the villages of "Balh", "Barhal", "Hevegilivane", "Hevegikiskim", "Köbak", "Utav", "Vanishav" and "Zemevan". Shortly afterwards, the village of Sarıgöl was renamed Taşkıran, but the subdistrict retained the name Sarıgöl. Accordingly, the 1960 general census listed the village of Zğapor under the name Sarıgöl, while the 1965 census recorded it as Taşkıran.

The Sarıgöl Subdistrict ceased to exist following the abolition of the subdistrict (nahiye or bucak) administrative system in Turkey. However, the name Sarıgöl survives today as the name of a neighbourhood within the village of Taşkıran.
