= Kldistavi, Yusufeli =

Kldistavi (Georgian: კლდისთავი) is a neighborhood of Demirdöven (formerly Zemovani) village in Yusufeli District of Artvin Province in Turkey. One source states that the new name of the neighborhood is "Verimli".

== History ==
Kldistavi is a Georgian place name composed of the words "klde" (კლდე) and "tavi" (თავი), meaning "rock top". This place name is written in different forms in Turkish, such as "Kildistav" and "Kıldıztav".

Kldistavi is located in Tao, one of the regions that formed the western part of Georgia in the Middle Ages. Indeed, the Ottomans seized this region from the Georgians after the Georgian campaign of 1549. However, this settlement is not registered as a village in Ottoman registers.

In 1835, when the Ottoman administration only registered the male population, Kldistavi was a neighborhood of the village of Zemovani. Zemovani was a waqf village in the Livane district of the Livane-i Ulya sanjak of the Childir Eyalet. The neighborhood of Kldistavi, whose name in this register has been read as "Keldesa", "Kildista", and "Kelirsa" in different publications, consisted of 63 households. In the entire village of Zemovani, including other neighborhoods, 373 Muslim men were registered in 96 households.

Kldistavi, commonly spelled "Kildistav" in Turkish, currently maintains its status as one of the neighborhoods of Demirdöven village, known as Verimli.
