= Cankurtaran Tunnel =

Road tunnel in Artvin Province, Turkey

Cankurtaran Tunnel Cankurtaran Tüneli
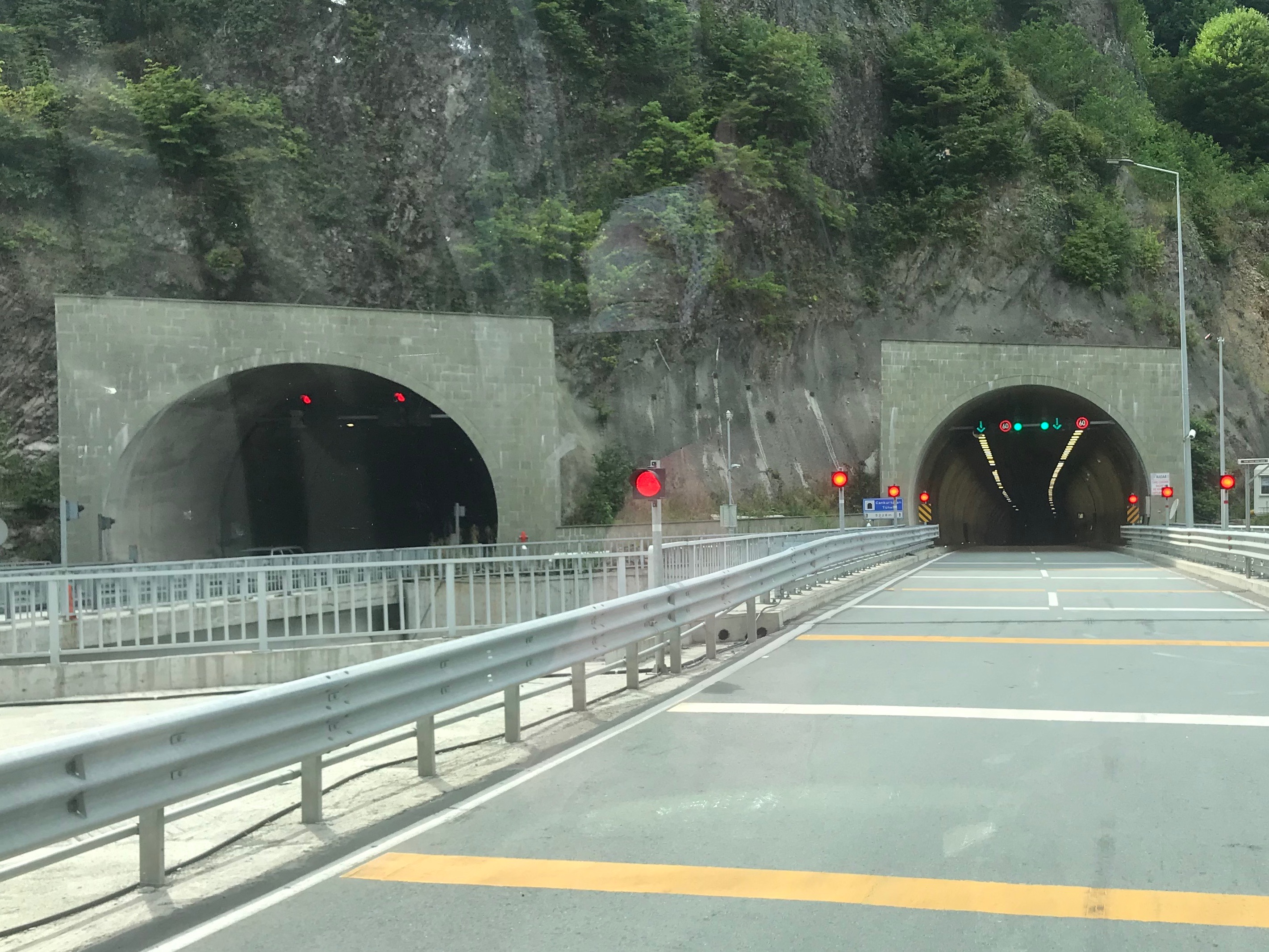
- Interactive map of Cankurtaran Tunnel; Cankurtaran Tüneli

Overview
- Location: Çavuşlu, Hopa - Çifteköprü, Borçka in Artvin Province, Turkey
- Coordinates: 41°23′00″N 41°32′16″E
- Status: Operational
- Route: D.010

Operation
- Work began: 29 October 2010
- Opened: 1 March 2018; 8 years ago
- Owner: General Directorate of Highways
- Traffic: automotive
- Character: Twin-tube highway tunnel

Technical
- Length: 5,228 m (17,152 ft)
- No. of lanes: 2 x 2

Location of Cankurtaran Tunnel in Turkey

The Cankurtaran Tunnel (Turkish: Cankurtaran Tüneli), a.k.a. Hopa Cankurtaran Tunnel, is a road tunnel located in Artvin Province. It forms part of the Hopa-Borçka Highway D.010 in northeastern Turkey.

Situated on the Mount Cankurtaran of Pontic Mountains between the village Çavuşlu in the Hopa district to the west and the village of Çifteköprü in the Borçka district to the east, it is a 5,228 m (17,152 ft)-long twin-tube tunnel carrying two lanes of traffic in each direction. The cost of the construction was estimated to be ₺100 million.

It was built to bypass the Cankurtaran Pass at 690 m (2,260 ft) elevation with many hairpin turns, thus improving the connection between the Black Sea Region and Eastern Anatolia region, and thus to the Middle Eastern countries. The tunnel also eliminates weather-induced traffic congestion due to heavy snow fall, icing and fog. Finally, it shortened the existing route by about 12 km (7.5 mi).

The groundbreaking ceremony took place in the presence of Minister of Transport, Maritime and Communication Binali Yıldırım on 29 October 2010, the Republic Day. The breakthrough was achieved in presence of Minister of Customs and Trade Hayati Yazıcı on 16 March 2014; the tunnel was opened to traffic on 1 March 2018 by Turkish Minister of Transport, Maritime and Communication Ahmet Arslan.
