= Kvabikari, Yusufeli =

Kvabikari (Georgian: ქვაბიკარი) was one of the settlements in the historical Tao region. In the 19th century, it was a neighborhood of Ahoti (now Kömürlü) village in the Yusufeli District of Artvin Province in Turkey.

== History ==
Kvabikari (ქვაბიკარი), a Georgian place name, is composed of the words "kvabi" (ქვაბი) and "kari" (კარი) and means "cave door / cave passage". The name Kvabikari is still a place name in Georgia today.

Kvabikari is located in Tao, one of the regions that formed the western part of Georgia in the Middle Ages. Indeed, the Ottomans seized this region from the Georgians after the Georgian campaign of 1549. However, this settlement is not registered as a village in Ottoman registers.

In 1835, when the Ottoman administration only registered the male population for tax purposes and conscription, Kvabikari was one of the two neighborhoods of Ahoti village. The other neighborhood was called "Kölik-i Ulya". The name "Kvabkar" (كوبكار) in the register was also read as "Kübkar" and "Kodikar". At that time, Ahoti village was under the Kavkaseti district of the Livane-i Ulya sanjak of the Çıldır Province. At that time, 49 men were registered in 18 households in Kvabikari. When the number of women is added to the number of men, it can be said that the total population of the neighborhood consisted of approximately 98 people.

Taner Artvinli, who has a study on the Yusufeli district, stated that he could not locate this neighborhood today.
