= Demirkent =

Demirkent can refer to:

- Demirkent, Erzincan
- Demirkent, Yusufeli
