= Arsiats por =

Arsiats-por (Արսյաց փոր) was a canton In the province of Tayk in the kingdom of Armenia, Corresponding to the modern Kiskim Valley in the province of Yusufeli in Turkey. Settlements included the fort-town of Berdagrak (Yusufeli), The city of Arsiq in the south, and the city of Parkhar in the north. The province was part of Sassanid-Armenia and was in the possession of the Mamikonian family that ruled Tayk. It was ruled by the Islamic Caliphate as part of the Emirate of Armenia under the Bagratuni family.

later passing on to Byzantine and Georgian rule, and finally conquered by the Ottomans from the Georgian kingdom of Meshkheti. During the early 18th century much of the Armenian population converted to Islam. The village of Khewag (Yaylalar) was an Armenian Muslim village visited by Venetian Mekhitarist priest Inchichian who recorded that the population greeted him warmly and watched him curiously as he celebrated mass in the old village church and asked for him to pray for the deceased members of the village. He noted that most of the Muslim population of the province was Armenian in origin and that few stayed loyal to Christianity.
