= Ishkhani =

Former Georgian Orthodox monastery in İşhan, Turkey

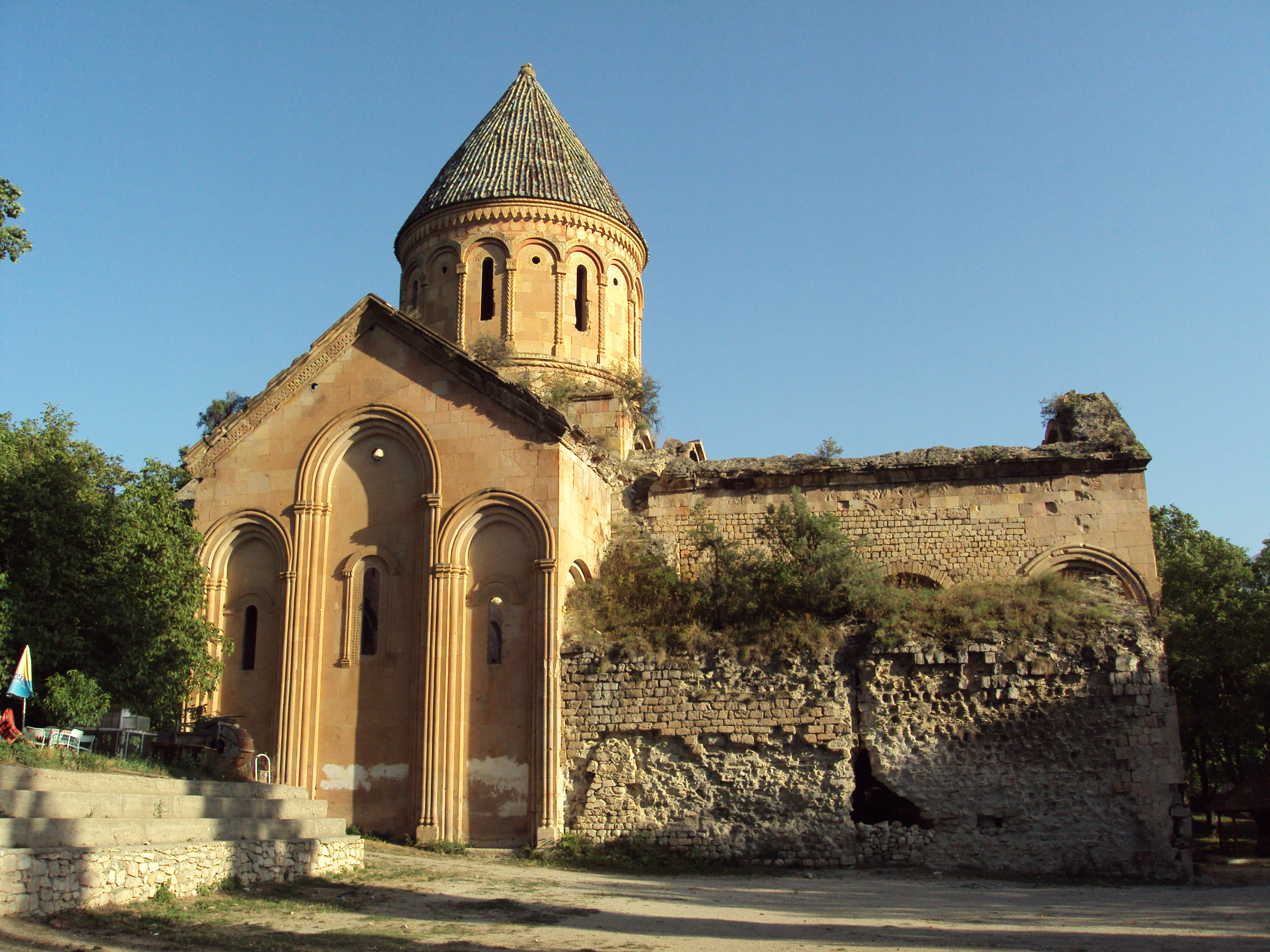
- Ishkhani monastery

- Location within Turkey

Location
- Location: İşhan, Yusufeli District, Artvin Province, Turkey
- Coordinates: 40.78565°N 41.74698°E

Ishkani Ishkhani Monastery (Georgian: იშხანი, Turkish: İşhan Kilisesi) was built in the 7th century during the early Christian period in Tao-Klarjeti (historical Georgia, today in Turkey’s Artvin province).

- The monastery was founded around 639 AD by King Adarnase III of Iberia (Kartli).
- It was further expanded and rebuilt in the 10th century by Bagrat III, the first king of united Georgia.
- Georgian chroniclers also attribute the original design to the famous architect Tiridates, though some sources suggest that local master builders worked under royal patronage.

It became one of the most important cultural and religious centers of Tao-Klarjeti, famous for its large basilica-style church, inscriptions, and as a hub of Georgian manuscript production.

== Architecture ==
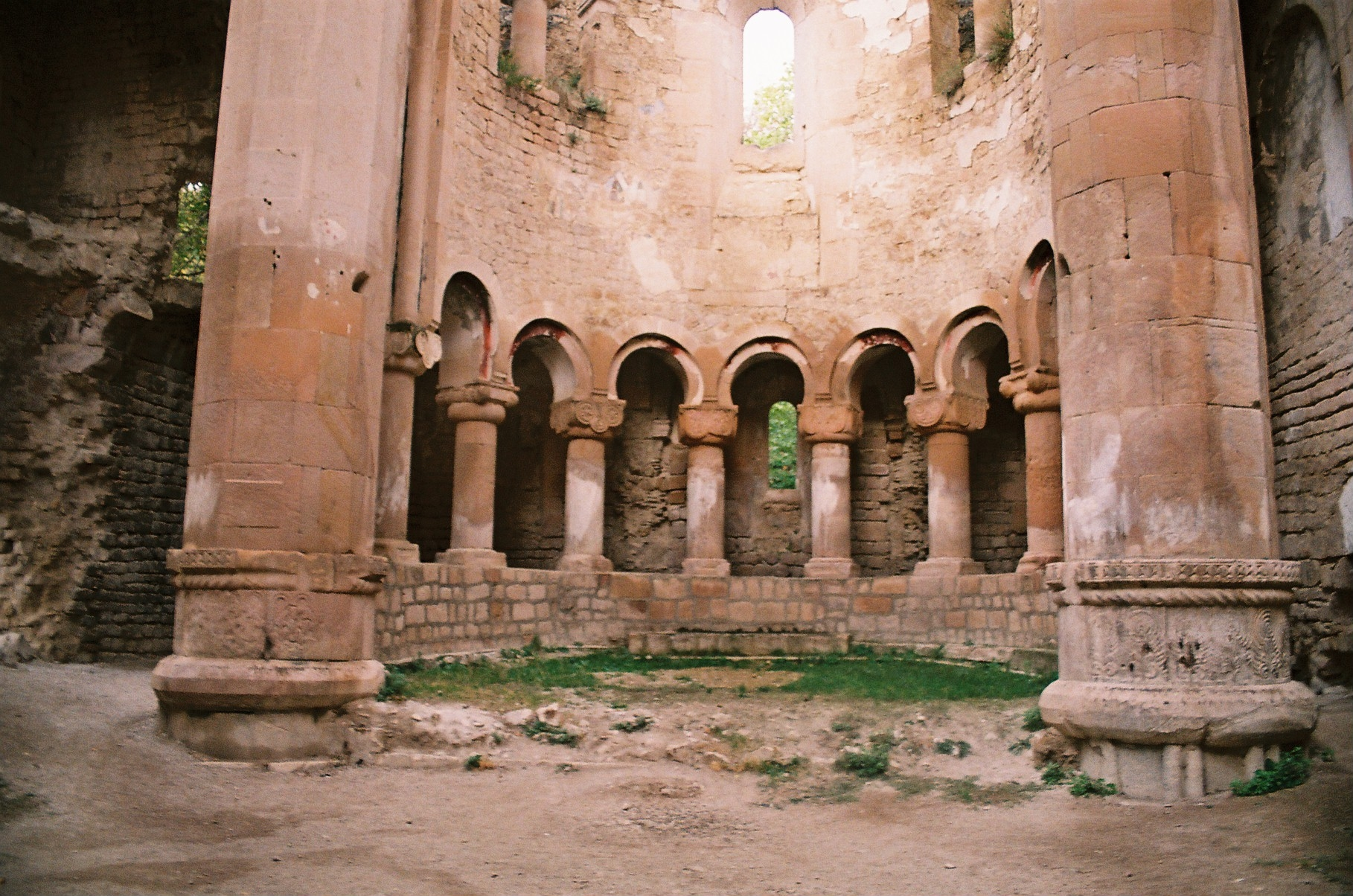
Altar columns

The church (outer dimensions 35.00 x 20.70 meters) is a domed cruciform structure. The dome over the central square bay rests on four free-standing piers, each having a diameter of about two-meters. The eastern cross-arm is extended with an apse that has a unique arrangement. A horseshoe-shaped arcade whose arches rest on eight monolithic columns with decorated cubic capitals opens on to a rectangular ambulatory. The rooms flanking the apse have upper stories. There are two-story pastophoria which were used to store priestly vestments and altar furniture.

The elongated west cross-arm is about three times deeper than the south and north cross-arms. During the conversion of the church into a mosque, a wall was constructed between the west arm and the central bay, the south and west entrances were closed, a mihrab niche facing in the direction of Mecca was constructed within the closed southern entrance, and the northern annex was converted into a prayer hall.

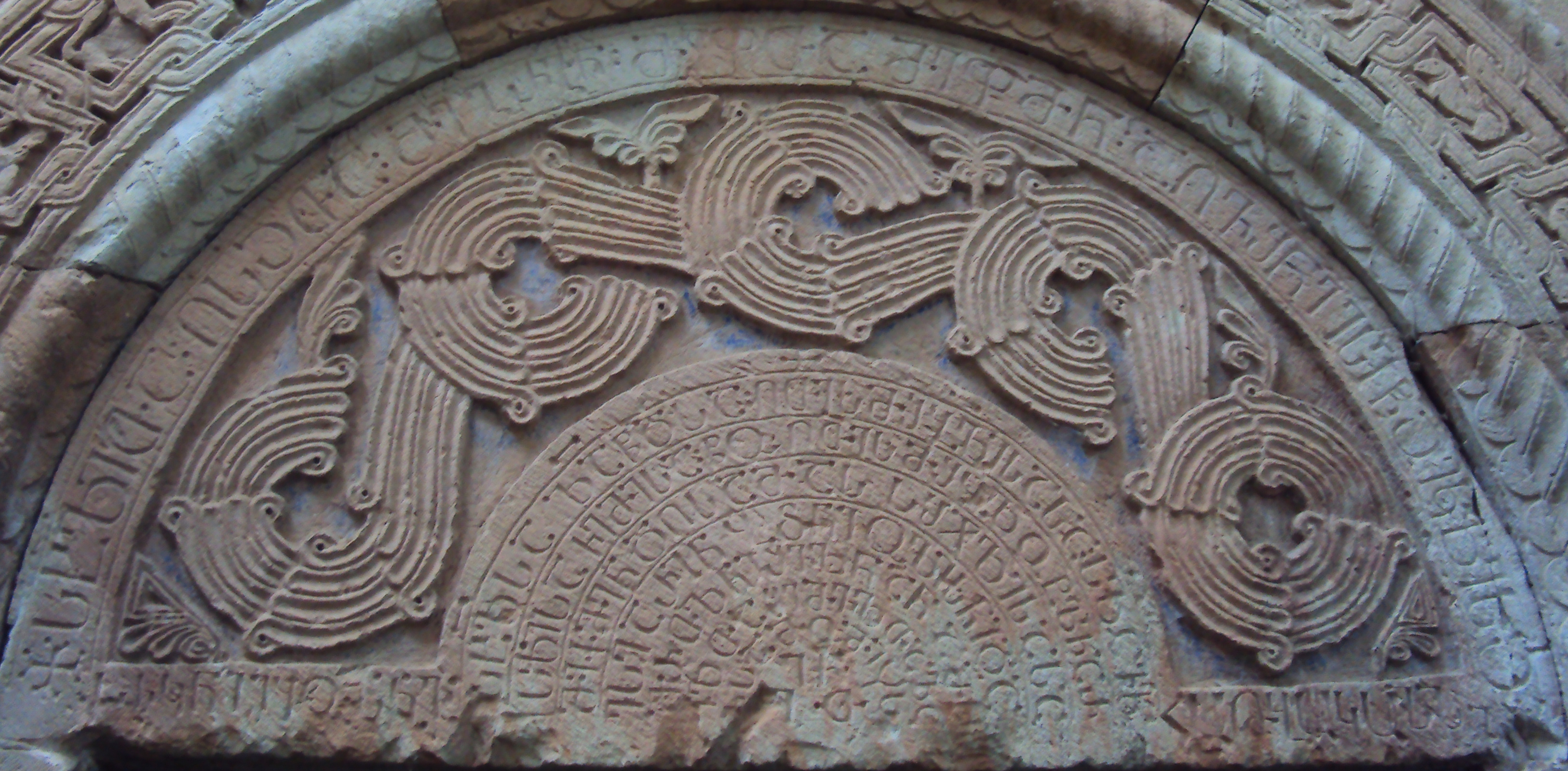
Inscription of King Gurgen of Iberia, in Georgian, with the date 1006 in both Georgian and Armenian, on the cathedral's oratory chapel

In 966, the interior walls of the church were covered with frescoes. Only the paintings in the cupola and the drum have come down to us. In the cupola the “Ascension of the Cross” is depicted, where a jeweled cross is being carried by four flying angels. Below this scene, repeated four times at each axis, is a two-wheeled chariot, drawn by four winged horses and driven by a standing figure. Above each chariot there is a Georgian inscription mentioning the colors of the horses. This repetitive scene is generally accepted as depicting the “Vision of Zachariah” (6:1-6) from the Old Testament.

Within the blind arcade of the drum, eight standing figures alternate with eight windows. During the restoration work in 1032 the heads of these figures identified as prophets by some scholars, were replaced by round openings. Above each prophet, in a circular niche, an angel holding a scepter is depicted. On the arches of the windows there are the busts of other holy figures. The rest of the frescoes found on the north, south and west walls are severely damaged and are in need of restoration. However, a female figure dressed in blue, carrying a diadem and holding a church model in her hand can still be observed on the intrado of the northwestern window. This figure has been interpreted by scholars either as the Cappadocian Saint Nino, who converted the Georgians to Christianity, or the first Christian queen of Georgia, or a symbol of the church itself.

The facades of the church constructed with well-cut, multi — coloured stones are enlivened by recessed blind arcades and deep triangular niches. The same arrangement is repeated on the dome of the drum where the blind arcades enclose rectangular and circular windows. The conícal roof of the dome is covered with alternating rows of dark red and grey coloured glazed tiles.

22 different geometric and floral motives are employed in the sculptural decoration of the church. The patterns of the capitals and bases of the columns, of the arches and window frames, of the drums and cornices do not follow a strict decorative program. The only figurative decoration, a combat between a lion and what may be a dragon or a snake, can be seen on the sill of a window on the southern façade of the west cross-arm.

According to the Georgian inscription placed on the entrance of the chapel, situated to the southwest of the cathedral, King Gurgen I (died 1008) dedicated the chapel to the Holy Mother of God. Constructed in 1006, the chapel (outer dimensions 10.30x5.70 meters) is a single-naved, vaulted structure with an apse and two windows, one to the east and the other to the west.

The arches of the entrance and windows are decorated with geometric, floral and figural motives. Animals and legendary creatures are depicted within the geometric patterns. It seems as if the interior walls of the chapel used to be covered with frescoes. However, only the figures in the apse, including a portrayal of the enthroned Christ can still be identified.

== Fortress ==
Ruins of a mediaeval fortress of the same name were found on the rocky mountain to the northwest of the church. The fortress was probably one of the most important fortifications in Tao-Klarjeti, and once served as refuge to then Prince Giorgi, the future George V of Georgia. İbrahim Peçevi is reported to suggest that the fortress was probably demolished during an Ottoman campaign in 1549.

== Gallery ==
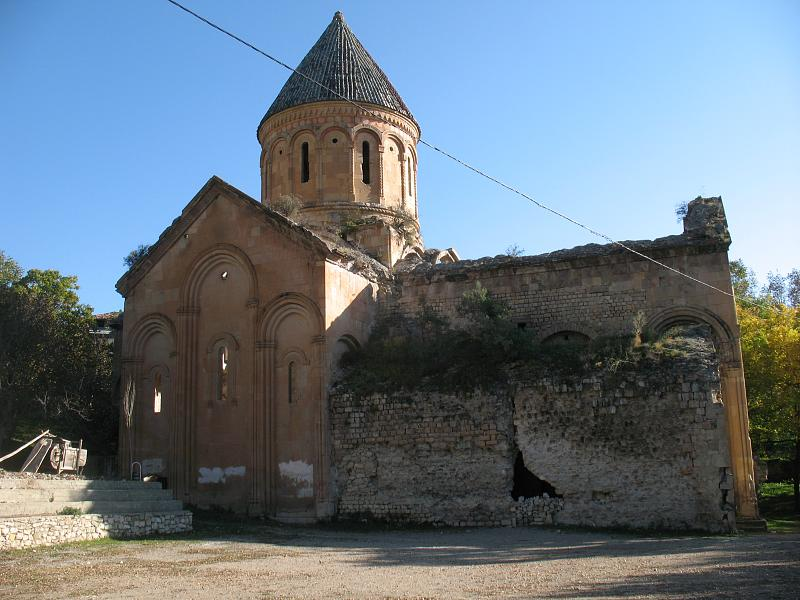
Outside of church

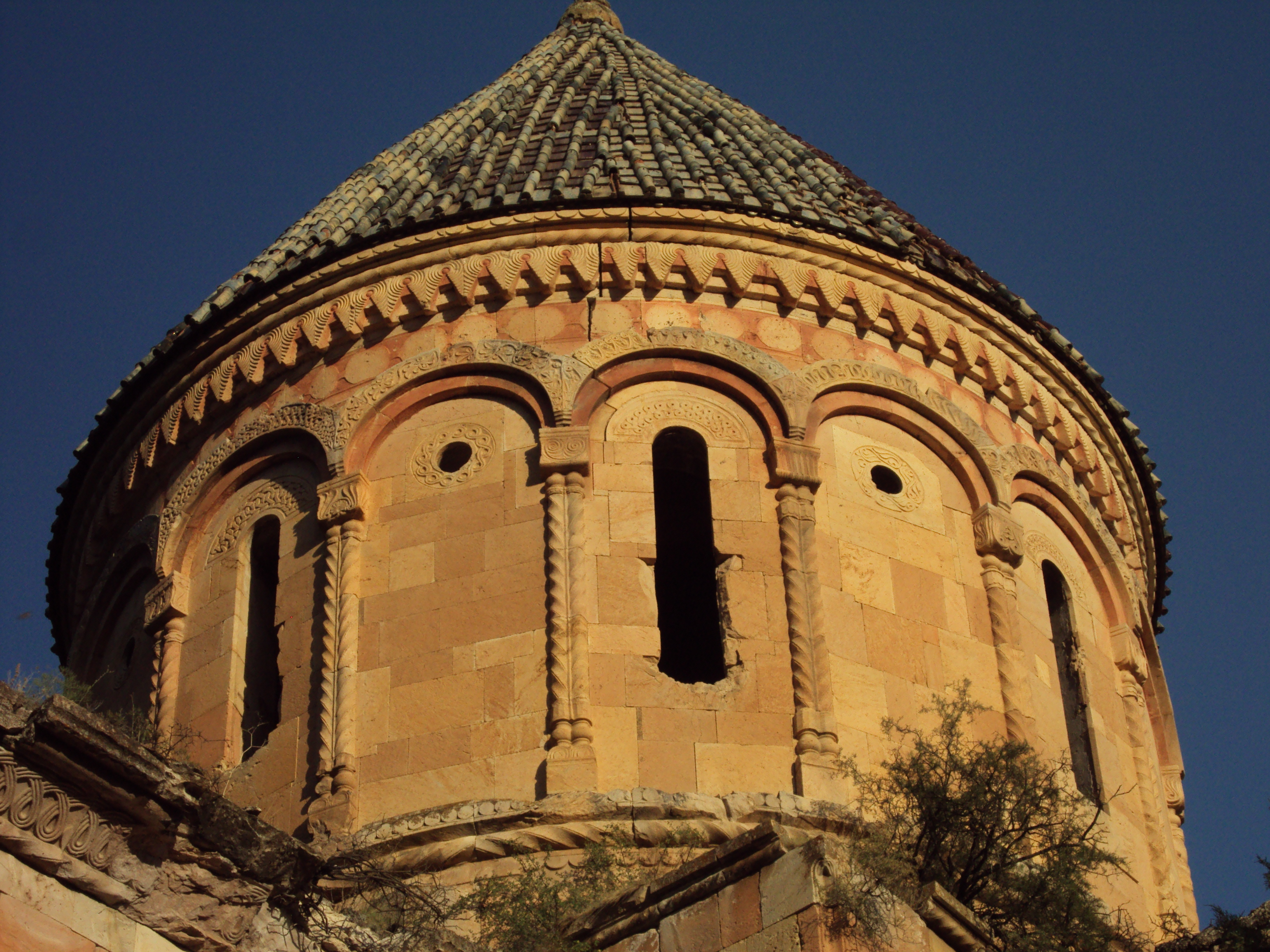
Ishkhan Monastery

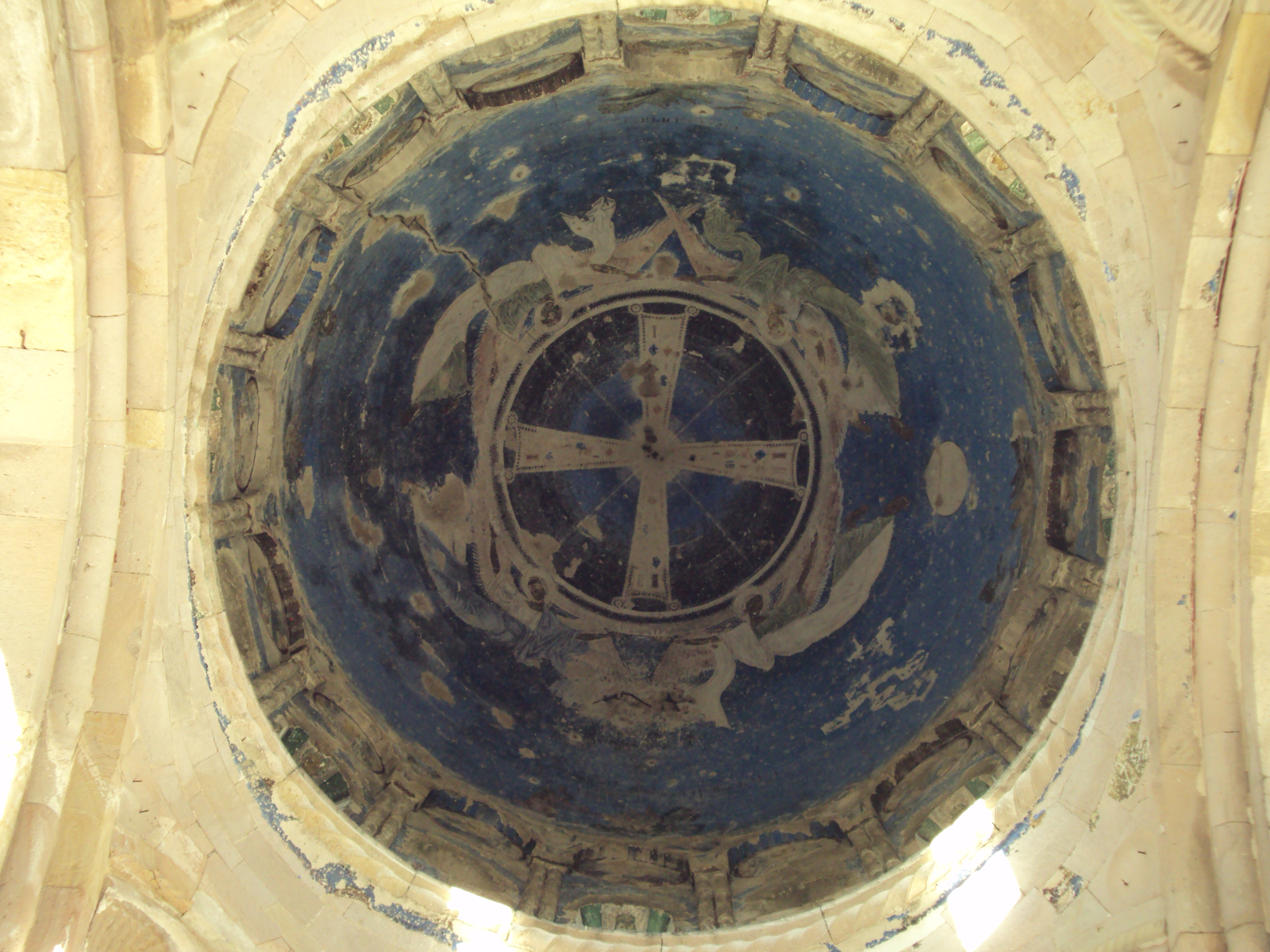
Dome of church

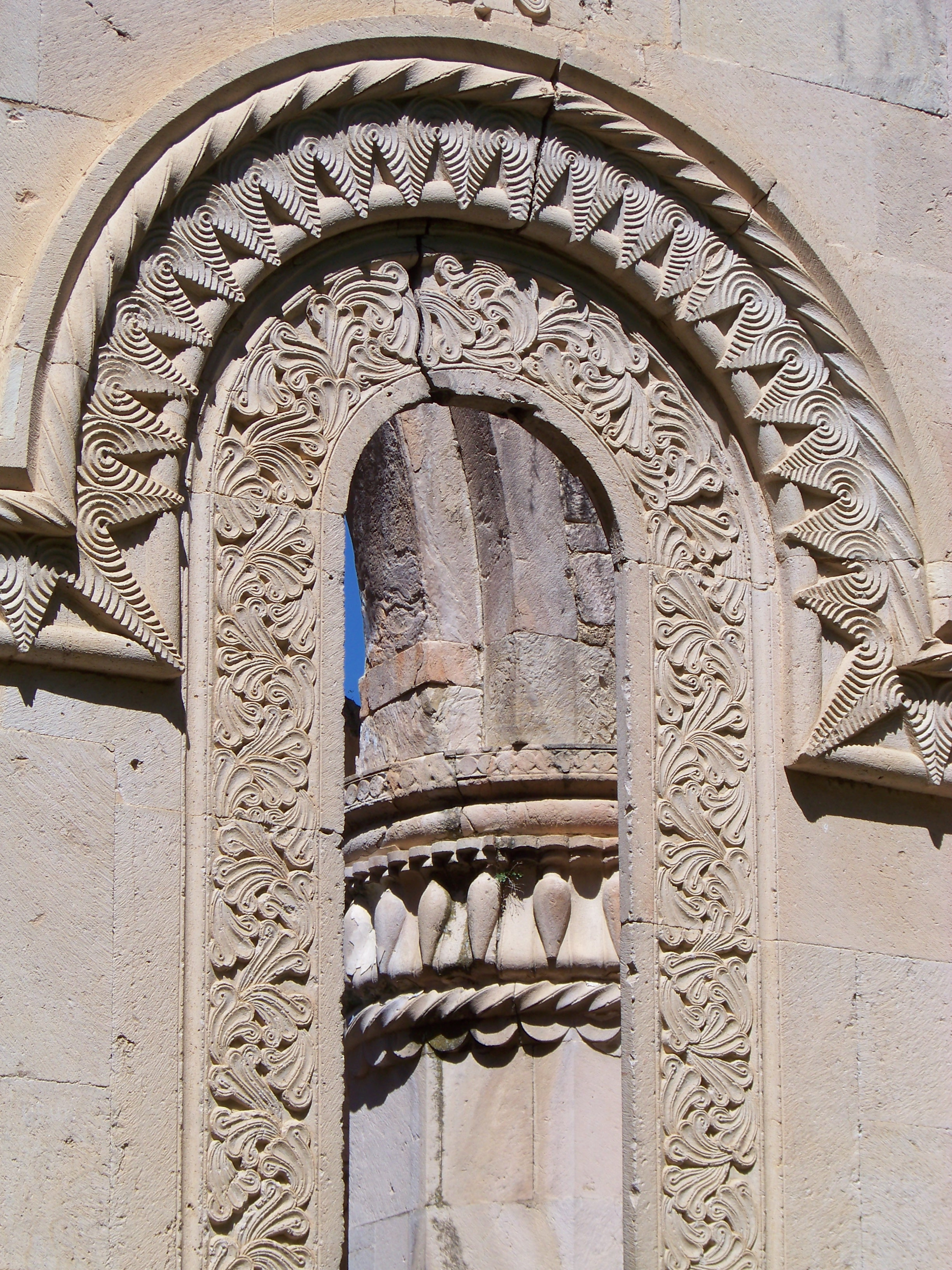
Ornamentation

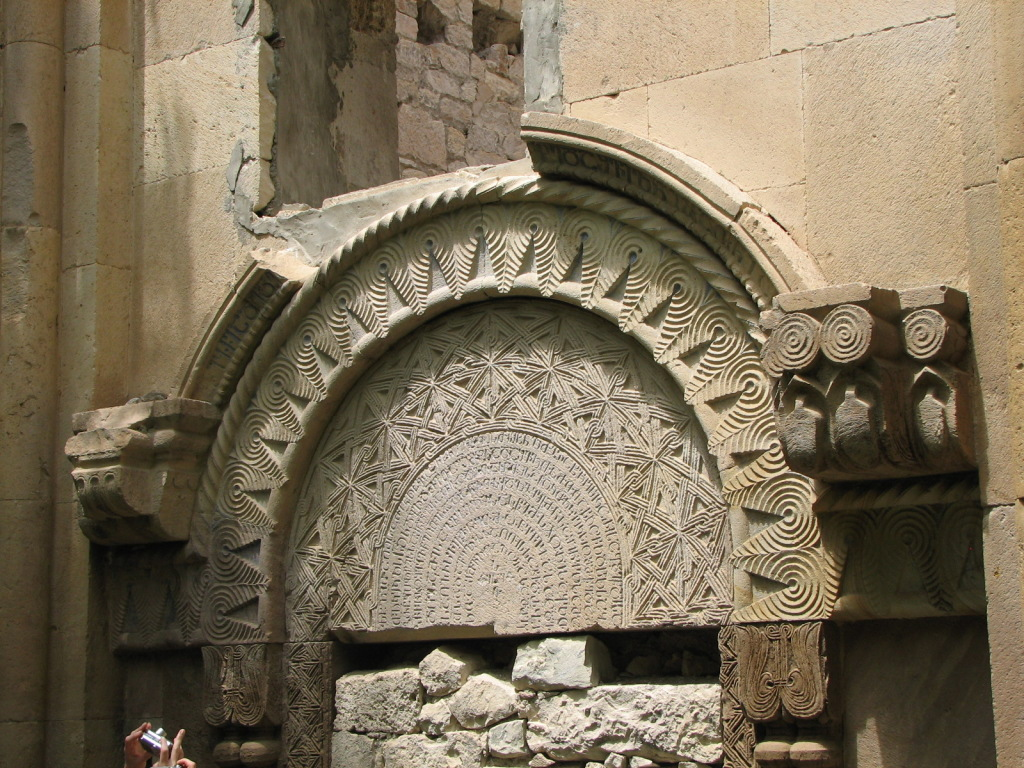
Ornamentation & inscription
