= Hopa District =

District of Artvin Province, Turkey

- District
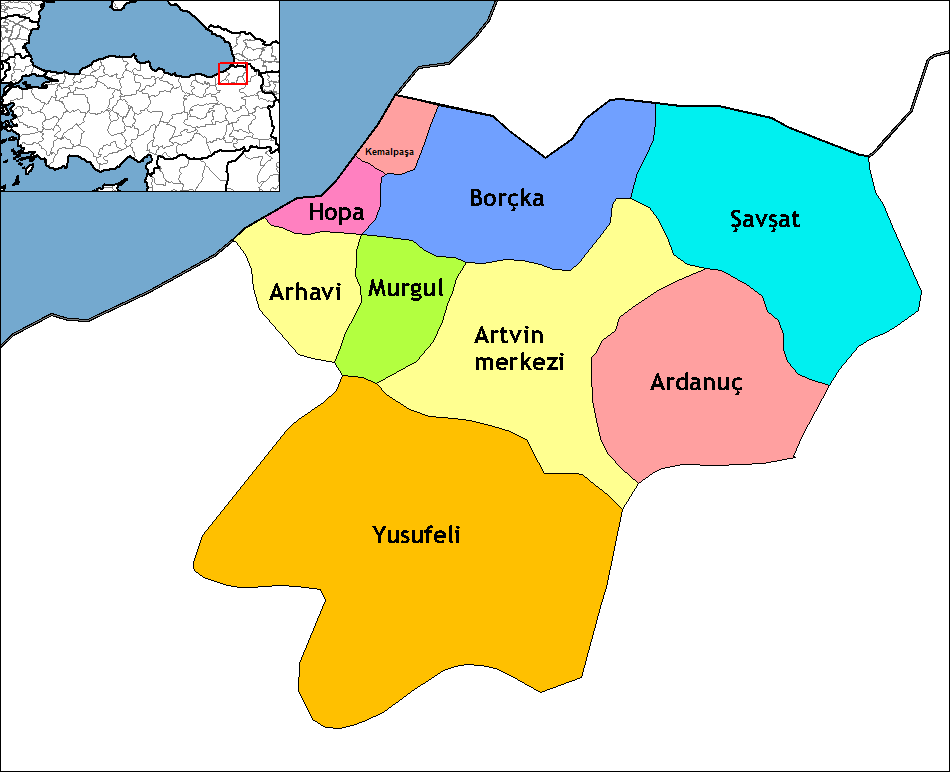
- Map showing Hopa District in Artvin Province

- Location in Turkey
- Coordinates: 41°23′N 41°25′E
- Country: Turkey
- Province: Artvin
- Seat: Hopa

Government
  - Kaymakam: Gürkan Üçüncü
- Area: 130 km^{2} (50 sq mi)
- Population (2021): 28,136
  - Density: 220/km^{2} (560/sq mi)
- Time zone: UTC+3 (TRT)
- Website: www.hopa.gov.tr

Hopa District is a district of Artvin Province of Turkey. Its seat is the town Hopa. Its area is 130 km^{2}, and its population is 28,136 (2021). In 2017, the Kemalpaşa District was created from part of Hopa District.

== Composition ==
There is one municipality in Hopa District:

- Hopa

There are 16 villages in Hopa District:

- Balıkköy
- Başköy
- Başoba
- Çamlı
- Çavuşlu
- Çimenli
- Esenkıyı
- Eşmekaya
- Güneşli
- Güvercinli
- Hendek
- Koyuncular
- Pınarlı
- Subaşı
- Yeşilköy
- Yoldere
