= Esenyaka, Yusufeli =

Esenyaka
- Village
- Location within Turkey
- Coordinates: 40°54′48″N 41°43′08″E
- Country: Turkey
- Province: Artvin
- District: Yusufeli
- Population (2021): 216
- Time zone: UTC+3 (TRT)

Esenyaka is a village in the Yusufeli District, Artvin Province, Turkey. Its population is 216 (2021).

== Geography ==
Esenyaka is located 76 km from the city centre of Artvin and 29 km from the district centre of Yusufeli.

== Population ==
Population by year
Year	Population
2021	216
2020	222
2019	229
2018	220
2017	190
2016	215
2015	243
2014	268
2013	290
2012	292
2011	287
2010	286
2009	307
2008	323
2007	314
2000	441
