= Çağlıyan, Yusufeli =

Çağlıyan
- Village
- Location within Turkey
- Country: Turkey
- Province: Artvin
- District: Yusufeli
- Population (2021): 40
- Time zone: UTC+3 (TRT)

Çağlıyan is a village in the Yusufeli District, Artvin Province, Turkey. Its population is 40 (2021).

== History ==
The village of Çağlıyan was formerly known as "Hostapor" in Turkish sources and "Khostapori" (ხოსტაპორი) in Georgian sources. Formerly a neighborhood of Tsklispiri, Khostapori became an independent village in 1956 under the name Çağlayan. According to the 1965 general population census, Çağlıyan had a population of 147, of whom 85 were literate.
