= Boyalı, Yusufeli =

Boyalı
- Village
- Location within Turkey
- Coordinates: 40.9882°N 41.5658°E
- Country: Turkey
- Province: Artvin
- District: Yusufeli
- Population (2021): 66
- Time zone: UTC+3 (TRT)

Boyalı is a village in the Yusufeli District, Artvin Province, Turkey. Its population is 66 (2021).

== History ==
The village's former name was Sacvareti. The Georgian place name Sacvareti (საჯვარეთი) comes from sacvare (საჯვარე), which is derived from cvari (ჯვარი, "cross"). Sacvare referred to places where crosses were erected. Georgian historian and archaeologist Ekvtime Takaishvili wrote that old churches and sacvare areas became places of pilgrimage after the local population converted to Islam.

Sacvareti entered Turkish as Sacvaret and Sacveret. It appears as Sacvaret (ساجوارت) in the 1876 Trabzon Vilayeti Salnamesi and as Sacveret (ساجورت) in the 1928 Ottoman Turkish village list.

The village was located in Tao, one of the regions that made up medieval Georgia. The Ottomans captured the region and the village from the Georgians in the mid-16th century. The village's fortress probably dates from this period.

Sacvareti does not appear in Ottoman records until late in the period. According to the 1876 Trabzon Vilayeti Salnamesi, it was one of the villages of Livana district in the Lazistan sanjak of Trabzon Vilayet. The village had 21 households and a population of 107. The same yearbook also records 3 donkeys, 20 oxen, 40 cows, 273 goats, and 200 sheep as taxable livestock.

In the 1928 Ottoman Turkish village list, Sacvareti belonged to the central *nahiye* of Yusufeli district in Artvin Province. In the 1940 census, the village, written as "Saçveret", was in the same administrative position within Çoruh Province and had a population of 356. Because Sacvereti or Sacveret was not Turkish, the village name was changed to Boyalı in 1959 under Law No. 7267. In the 1965 general census, Boyalı had a population of 494, of whom 142 were literate.

The area of present-day Boyalı consisted of two separate villages during the Ottoman period: Kosketi, at a higher elevation, and Sacvereti, lower down by the Balalan Stream. These two nearby villages were united under a single muhtarlık in the Republican period. The village was named Boyalı in reference to a nearby red dye.

The only surviving historical structure in the village is Sacvreti Fortress. It was built on a difficult-to-access rock. Only a wall fragment about 2 metres long and a cistern survive today.

== Geography ==
Boyalı is 140 km from Artvin and 35 km from Yusufeli.

== Population ==
Population history of the village
2021	66
2020	86
2019	87
2018	90
2017	77
2016	80
2015	82
2014	94
2013	99
2012	93
2011	95
2010	113
2009	110
2008	118
2007	130
2000	191
1990	359
1985	460
