= Savangin =

Cave in Turkey

Savangin is a prehistoric natural cave with an inscription written in an unknown or unsolved alphabet. It was found in 1995 near the village Bakırtepe, part of Artvin Province, Turkey. Along with the inscriptions, researchers found cave paintings of deer.
