= Yüncüler, Yusufeli =

Yüncüler
- Village
- Location within Turkey
- Coordinates: 40.781°N 41.351°E
- Country: Turkey
- Province: Artvin
- District: Yusufeli
- Population (2021): 308
- Time zone: UTC+3 (TRT)

Yüncüler is a village in the Yusufeli District, Artvin Province, Turkey. Its population is 308 (2021).
