= Esenkıyı, Hopa =

Esenkıyı
- Village
- Location within Turkey
- Coordinates: 41.4397°N 41.4634°E
- Country: Turkey
- Province: Artvin
- District: Hopa
- Population (2021): 404
- Time zone: UTC+3 (TRT)

Esenkıyı (formerly: Abuisla) is a village in the Hopa District, Artvin Province, Turkey. Its population is 404 (2021).
