= Yamaçüstü, Yusufeli =

Yamaçüstü
- Village
- Location within Turkey
- Coordinates: 40°36′N 41°24′E
- Country: Turkey
- Province: Artvin
- District: Yusufeli
- Population (2021): 257
- Time zone: UTC+3 (TRT)

Yamaçüstü is a village in the Yusufeli District, Artvin Province, Turkey. Its population is 257 (2021).
