= Bahçeli, Yusufeli =

Bahçeli
- Village
- Location within Turkey
- Coordinates: 40.8442°N 41.5038°E
- Country: Turkey
- Province: Artvin
- District: Yusufeli
- Population (2021): 102
- Time zone: UTC+3 (TRT)

Bahçeli (historically Kisporeti) is a village in the Yusufeli District, Artvin Province, Turkey. Its population is 102 (2021).

== History ==
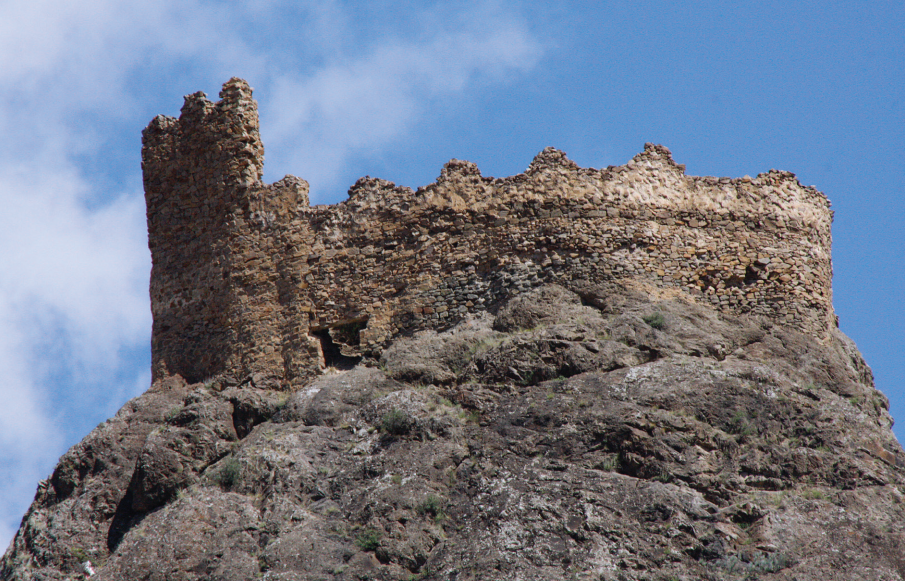
Kisporeti Castle, dating from the Early Middle Ages

The village's historical name was Kisporeti. The Georgian place name Kisporeti (ქისპორეთი) entered Turkish as Kisporot.

During the Early and Late Middle Ages, Kisporeti was part of the Georgian political sphere. The Ottomans captured the village from the Principality of Samtskhe during the first half of the 16th century.

According to the Ottoman tax register of 1574, Kisporeti was part of the Pertekrek nahiye of Tortum sanjak and contained 18 households. The entire population was recorded as Christian. The village had a mill, and its inhabitants cultivated wheat, barley, grapes, and alfalfa. They also engaged in beekeeping and raised sheep and pigs.

According to the Ottoman population survey of 1835, Kisporeti was a village of Kiskim sanjak with 38 households and 127 male inhabitants. Since Ottoman population registers traditionally recorded only males, the village's total population is estimated to have been approximately 252 people, with an average household size of about 6.6 persons. In 1848, Kisporeti belonged to Pertekrek kaza of Erzurum Eyalet and had a population of 100 people living in 20 households.

Kisporeti was recorded as Kisporut in the population censuses conducted during the first half of the 20th century. Its appearance as Avcılı (Kisperit) in the 1960 census indicates that the village's name had been changed to Avcılı in 1959 on the grounds that it was considered to be of foreign origin. In the 1980 census, the village was recorded as Bahçeli (Avcılı-Kisport), indicating that the name Bahçeli replaced Avcılı sometime between 1975 and 1980.

The only known historical structure in the village is Kisporeti Castle. The castle stands 2.4 km northeast of the village on a high rock overlooking the right bank of the Barhal River. Built with lime mortar, the fortress measures 17.10 × 14.60 m and is believed to date from the Early Middle Ages. It was later used by the Ottomans. A nearly square tower measuring 3.32 × 3.10 m stands at its southwestern corner. Much of the fortification wall has survived to the present day.

== Geography ==
Bahçeli is located 115 km from Artvin and 10 km from Yusufeli.

== Population ==
Year	Population
2021	102
2020	114
2019	113
2018	98
2017	87
2016	81
2015	80
2014	88
2013	107
2012	119
2011	110
2010	106
2009	100
2008	105
2007	108
2000	202
1990	490
1985	482
