= Balıkköy, Hopa =

Balıkköy
- Village
- Location within Turkey
- Coordinates: 41.3670°N 41.4601°E
- Country: Turkey
- Province: Artvin
- District: Hopa
- Population (2021): 200
- Time zone: UTC+3 (TRT)

Balıkköy (also: Balık, Laz language: Zendidi) is a village in the Hopa District, Artvin Province, Turkey. Its population is 200 (2021).
