= Başoba, Hopa =

Başoba
- Village
- Location within Turkey
- Coordinates: 41°25′N 41°29′E
- Country: Turkey
- Province: Artvin
- District: Hopa
- Population (2021): 482
- Time zone: UTC+3 (TRT)

Başoba is a village in the Hopa District, Artvin Province, Turkey. Its population is 482 (2021).
