= Arpacık, Yusufeli =

Arpacık
- Village
- Location within Turkey
- Coordinates: 40.7529°N 41.7416°E
- Country: Turkey
- Province: Artvin
- District: Yusufeli
- Population (2021): 123
- Time zone: UTC+3 (TRT)

Arpacık is a village in the Yusufeli District, Artvin Province, Turkey. Its population is 123 (2021).

== History ==
The former name of the village was Osha (اوسخە), as recorded in Turkish sources. The name is derived from the Georgian Otsha (ოცხა). A village of the same name in the Akhaltsikhe region was likewise recorded as Osha in the 1595 Ottoman detailed register of the Province of Georgia.

The village lay in the historical region of Tao, one of the regions that formed medieval Georgia. The Ottomans conquered the area during the sixteenth century following the Georgian campaign of 1549. The ruined church located near the village is believed to date from this period.

In 1555, Otsha was one of the villages of the İşhan nahiye in the Tortum sanjak of Erzurum Province. The population consisted of 20 Christian households. According to the 1574 Ottoman tax register Defter-i Mufassal-i Vilayet-i Gürcistan, the village belonged to the Anzavi nahiye of Oltu and contained 16 households, one of which had converted to Islam.

The village was also recorded as Osha (اسخە) in the Ottoman cebe defteri of Çıldır Province covering the period 1694–1732. Its revenue was recorded as 5,000 akçe in the Hijri year 1121 (1709/1710) and 6,000 akçe in 1127 (1715).

At the time of the 1835 population survey, Otsha belonged to the Oltu sanjak of Çıldır Province. Because the survey was conducted for taxation and conscription purposes, only the male population was recorded. The village contained 14 males in 8 households.

In the 1928 Ottoman Turkish village list, Osha (اوسخە) was listed as a village of the Erkinis nahiye in the Yusufeli kaza of Artvin Province. In the 1933 village list, it was recorded as a village of Yusufeli district in Erzurum Province.

The settlement was later incorporated into İşhan as a neighbourhood and regained separate village status in 1995. During the same period, the name Osha was changed to Arpacık.

The remains of the village church associated with Otsha's former Christian population are situated approximately 1.5 km south of the present settlement. Surviving remains consist of fragments of roof tiles and sections of lime-mortared walls.

== Geography ==
Arpacık is located 121 km from Artvin and 25 km from Yusufeli.
