= Eşmekaya, Hopa =

Eşmekaya
- Village
- Location within Turkey
- Coordinates: 41.3822°N 41.4723°E
- Country: Turkey
- Province: Artvin
- District: Hopa
- Population (2021): 229
- Time zone: UTC+3 (TRT)

Eşmekaya is a village in the Hopa District, Artvin Province, Turkey. Its population is 229 (2021).
