= Başköy, Hopa =

Başköy
- Village
- Location within Turkey
- Coordinates: 41.4160°N 41.4625°E
- Country: Turkey
- Province: Artvin
- District: Hopa
- Population (2021): 175
- Time zone: UTC+3 (TRT)

Başköy (Laz language: Mxigi) is a village in the Hopa District, Artvin Province, Turkey. Its population is 175 (2021).
