= Koyuncular, Hopa =

Koyuncular
- Village
- Location within Turkey
- Coordinates: 41.4027°N 41.5047°E
- Country: Turkey
- Province: Artvin
- District: Hopa
- Population (2021): 418
- Time zone: UTC+3 (TRT)

Koyuncular (Laz language: Zalona) is a village in the Hopa District, Artvin Province, Turkey. Its population is 418 (2021).
