= Serinsu, Yusufeli =

Serinsu
- Village
- Location within Turkey
- Coordinates: 41.0237°N 41.5725°E
- Country: Turkey
- Province: Artvin
- District: Yusufeli
- Population (2021): 14
- Time zone: UTC+3 (TRT)

Serinsu is a village in the Yusufeli District, Artvin Province, Turkey. Its population is 14 (2021).
