= Yarbaşı, Yusufeli =

Yarbaşı
- Village
- Location within Turkey
- Coordinates: 40.9677°N 41.7386°E
- Country: Turkey
- Province: Artvin
- District: Yusufeli
- Population (2021): 107
- Time zone: UTC+3 (TRT)

Yarbaşı is a village in the Yusufeli District, Artvin Province, Turkey. Its population is 107 (2021).
