= Yağcılar, Yusufeli =

Yağcılar
- Village
- Location within Turkey
- Coordinates: 40.9437°N 41.7450°E
- Country: Turkey
- Province: Artvin
- District: Yusufeli
- Population (2021): 154
- Time zone: UTC+3 (TRT)

Yağcılar is a village in the Yusufeli District, Artvin Province, Turkey. Its population is 154 (2021).
