= Yeşilköy, Hopa =

Yeşilköy
- Village
- Location within Turkey
- Country: Turkey
- Province: Artvin
- District: Hopa
- Population (2021): 106
- Time zone: UTC+3 (TRT)

Yeşilköy (Laz language: Pancholi; პანჭოლი) is a village in the Hopa District, Artvin Province, Turkey. Its population is 106 (2021).
