= Hendek, Hopa =

Hendek
- Village
- Location within Turkey
- Coordinates: 41.3660°N 41.4487°E
- Country: Turkey
- Province: Artvin
- District: Hopa
- Population (2021): 245
- Time zone: UTC+3 (TRT)

Hendek (Laz language: Gvarci) is a village in the Hopa District, Artvin Province, Turkey. Its population is 245 (2021).
