= Günyayla, Yusufeli =

Günyayla
- Village
- Location within Turkey
- Coordinates: 40°55′3″N 41°52′29″E
- Country: Turkey
- Province: Artvin
- District: Yusufeli
- Population (2021): 56
- Time zone: UTC+3 (TRT)

Günyayla is a village in the Yusufeli District, Artvin Province, Turkey. Its population is 56 (2021).
