= Cevizlik, Yusufeli =

Cevizlik
- Village
- Location within Turkey
- Coordinates: 41.0272°N 41.7107°E
- Country: Turkey
- Province: Artvin
- District: Yusufeli
- Population (2021): 160
- Time zone: UTC+3 (TRT)

Cevizlik is a village in the Yusufeli District, Artvin Province, Turkey. Its population is 160 (2021).
