= Yokuşlu, Yusufeli =

Yokuşlu
- Village
- Location within Turkey
- Country: Turkey
- Province: Artvin
- District: Yusufeli
- Population (2021): 126
- Time zone: UTC+3 (TRT)

Yokuşlu is a village in the Yusufeli District, Artvin Province, Turkey. Its population is 126 (2021).
