= Dereiçi, Yusufeli =

Dereiçi
- Village
- Location within Turkey
- Coordinates: 40.8710°N 41.5127°E
- Country: Turkey
- Province: Artvin
- District: Yusufeli
- Population (2021): 424
- Time zone: UTC+3 (TRT)

Dereiçi is a village in the Yusufeli District, Artvin Province, Turkey. Its population is 424 (2021).
