= Avcılar, Yusufeli =

Avcılar
- Village
- Location within Turkey
- Coordinates: 40.6366°N 41.3958°E
- Country: Turkey
- Province: Artvin
- District: Yusufeli
- Population (2021): 56
- Time zone: UTC+3 (TRT)

Avcılar is a village in the Yusufeli District, Artvin Province, Turkey. Its population is 56 (2021). This village has an agriculturally and husbandry based economy.

== History ==
The former name of Avcılar was Kahnes. This place name appears in Georgian sources as Kahnesi (კახნესი).

The settlement was part of the historical Tao region within Tao-Klarceti, a medieval Georgian cultural and political area. The Ottomans took control of the region from Georgian administration in the mid-16th century. In Ottoman tax registers dated 1555 and 1574, the settlement appears as "Kaknis" and is recorded not as an independent village but as a hamlet of Oşnak.

In a later period, Kahnes became a neighbourhood of Çorgenis village. In 1956, it was reorganized as an independent village under the name Avcılar. In the 1960 general population census, Avcılar was recorded as a village in the Ersis subdistrict of Yusufeli district with a population of 326. By 1965, the population had increased to 338, of which 185 people were literate.

== Geography ==
Avcılar is located 159 km from Artvin city centre and 54 km from Yusufeli district centre.

== Population ==
Population history of the village
| 2021 | 56 |
| 2020 | 66 |
| 2019 | 81 |
| 2018 | 95 |
| 2017 | 95 |
| 2016 | 101 |
| 2015 | 115 |
| 2014 | 117 |
| 2013 | 120 |
| 2012 | 140 |
| 2011 | 146 |
| 2010 | 154 |
| 2009 | 148 |
| 2008 | 164 |
| 2007 | 163 |
| 2000 | 160 |
| 1990 | 273 |
| 1985 | 294 |
