= Sütlüce, Yusufeli =

Sütlüce
- Village
- Location within Turkey
- Country: Turkey
- Province: Artvin
- District: Yusufeli
- Population (2021): 57
- Time zone: UTC+3 (TRT)

Sütlüce is a village in the Yusufeli District, Artvin Province, Turkey. Its population is 57 (2021).
