= Çimenli, Hopa =

Çimenli
- Village
- Location within Turkey
- Coordinates: 41.3759°N 41.4796°E
- Country: Turkey
- Province: Artvin
- District: Hopa
- Population (2021): 151
- Time zone: UTC+3 (TRT)

Çimenli is a village in the Hopa District, Artvin Province, Turkey. Its population is 151 (2021).
