= Darıca, Yusufeli =

Darıca
- Village
- Location within Turkey
- Coordinates: 40.7373°N 41.7974°E
- Country: Turkey
- Province: Artvin
- District: Yusufeli
- Population (2021): 217
- Time zone: UTC+3 (TRT)

Darıca is a village in the Yusufeli District, Artvin Province, Turkey. Its population is 217 (2021).
