= Sebzeciler, Yusufeli =

Sebzeciler
- Village
- Location within Turkey
- Coordinates: 40°50′N 41°40′E
- Country: Turkey
- Province: Artvin
- District: Yusufeli
- Population (2021): 40
- Time zone: UTC+3 (TRT)

Sebzeciler is a village in the Yusufeli District, Artvin Province, Turkey. Its population is 40 (2021).
