= Ormandibi, Yusufeli =

Ormandibi
- Village
- Location within Turkey
- Coordinates: 40.7224°N 41.5656°E
- Country: Turkey
- Province: Artvin
- District: Yusufeli
- Population (2021): 113
- Time zone: UTC+3 (TRT)

Ormandibi is a village in the Yusufeli District, Artvin Province, Turkey. Its population is 113 (2021).
