= Erenköy, Yusufeli =

Erenköy
- Village
- Location within Turkey
- Coordinates: 40.9007°N 41.8429°E
- Country: Turkey
- Province: Artvin
- District: Yusufeli
- Population (2021): 149
- Time zone: UTC+3 (TRT)

Erenköy is a village in the Yusufeli District, Artvin Province, Turkey. Its population is 149 (2021).
