= Kınalıçam, Yusufeli =

Kınalıçam
- Village
- Location within Turkey
- Coordinates: 40°43′N 41°37′E
- Country: Turkey
- Province: Artvin
- District: Yusufeli
- Population (2021): 485
- Time zone: UTC+3 (TRT)

Kınalıçam is a village in the Yusufeli District, Artvin Province, Turkey. Its population is 485 (2021).
