= Dağeteği, Yusufeli =

Dağeteği
- Village
- Location within Turkey
- Coordinates: 40.7047°N 41.7763°E
- Country: Turkey
- Province: Artvin
- District: Yusufeli
- Population (2021): 100
- Time zone: UTC+3 (TRT)

Dağeteği is a village in the Yusufeli District, Artvin Province, Turkey. Its population is 100 (2021).
