= Pınarlı, Hopa =

Pınarlı
- Village
- Location within Turkey
- Coordinates: 41.3561°N 41.4253°E
- Country: Turkey
- Province: Artvin
- District: Hopa
- Population (2021): 84
- Time zone: UTC+3 (TRT)

Pınarlı (old name: Anchorox) is a village in the Hopa District, Artvin Province, Turkey. Its population is 84 (2021).
