= Yeniköy, Yusufeli =

Yeniköy
- Village
- Location within Turkey
- Coordinates: 40.7934°N 41.6725°E
- Country: Turkey
- Province: Artvin
- District: Yusufeli
- Population (2021): 182
- Time zone: UTC+3 (TRT)

Yeniköy is a village in the Yusufeli District, Artvin Province, Turkey. Its population is 182 (2021).
