= Irmakyanı, Yusufeli =

Irmakyanı
- Village
- Location within Turkey
- Coordinates: 40°49′N 41°36′E
- Country: Turkey
- Province: Artvin
- District: Yusufeli
- Population (2021): 139
- Time zone: UTC+3 (TRT)

Irmakyanı is a village in the Yusufeli District, Artvin Province, Turkey. Its population is 139 (2021).
