= Balalan, Yusufeli =

Balalan
- Village
- Location within Turkey
- Coordinates: 41°02′13″N 41°32′28″E
- Country: Turkey
- Province: Artvin
- District: Yusufeli
- Elevation: 2,044 m (6,706 ft)
- Population (2024): 73
- Time zone: UTC+3 (TRT)
- Postal code: 08820
- Area code: 0466

Balalan is a village in the Yusufeli District, Artvin Province, Turkey. Its population is 73 (2024).

== History ==
The former name of Balalan was Arcevani. This Georgian place name (არჯევანი) is thought to derive from the Georgian family name Arcevanidze (არჯევანიძე). According to the Georgian chronicle Matiane Kartlisai, the man who surrendered the Tzepta Fortress in Shavsheti to the Byzantines in 1028 was likewise named Arcevani. Arcevani still exists today in Georgia as the name of both a village and a mountain. The name entered Turkish as Arcevan; it appears as such (ارجوان) in an 1835 Ottoman population register and in the 1876 yearbook (salname) of Trabzon Province.

The historical Tao region, in which Arcevani is located, lay within the borders of Georgia in the Middle Ages. The Ottomans took the region and the village from the Georgians during the 1549 Georgian campaign. The two completely ruined churches in the village likely date from this period.

Under Ottoman administration, Arcevani was first attached to the sanjak of Livane and was later attached to the Çıldır Eyalet. According to the 1835 Ottoman population register, it belonged to the Kavkaseti nahiye of the Livane-i Ulya sanjak within this eyalet. In this census, in which the Ottoman administration recorded only the male population, the village—recorded as "Arcevan nahiye" (ارجوان ناحیە)—had 81 men in 34 households. In its dependent quarter of Zeviskal (زوسقال), 69 men were recorded in 16 households, while the central quarter, "Nefs-i Arcevan" (نفس آرجوان), had 110 men in 28 households. In total, 260 men were recorded in 78 households; adding an equal number of women, the village's total population is estimated at 520.

According to the 1876 yearbook of Trabzon Province, Arcevani was attached to the Livana kaza of the Lazistan Sanjak. Its population consisted of 85 people in 26 households; since the Ottoman administration recorded only the male population at this time as well, adding an equal female population indicates that around 170 people lived in Arcevani. Taxable livestock recorded in the village included 40 oxen, 50 cows, 470 goats, and 300 sheep. In this record, Zeviskal was listed as a separate village. After the Livana kaza was ceded to Russia in 1878 under the treaty that followed the Russo-Turkish War (1877–1878), Arcevani was attached to the Kiskim kaza of Erzurum Province.

In the 1928 Ottoman village list, the village was written as Arcevan (آرجوان); at that time it was attached to the central nahiye of the Yusufeli kaza of Artvin Province. In the 1940 general census, the village—recorded as "Arcivan"—held the same administrative position within Çoruh Province, with a population of 336. Because Arcevani or Arcivan was not Turkish, the village's name was changed to Balalan in 1959 under Law No. 7267. In the 1965 general census, the population of Balalan was 413, of whom 113 were literate.

Two churches are known to have existed in Arcevani: one in the Konalar quarter, and another at a site called "Kilise Sırtı" ("Church Ridge"). At the site called "Kilise Sırtı" in the village's Cami quarter, only small wall fragments and a few dressed stones remain of the church. Of the other church, in the Konalar quarter, only small remains survive today; from these remains it can be determined that the church was built using mortar.

== Geography ==
Balalan is 150 km from the provincial centre of Artvin and 45 km from the district centre of Yusufeli.

== Population ==
Village population by year
2024	73
2023	78
2022	88
2021	96
2020	97
2019	105
2018	123
2017	82
2016	86
2015	85
2014	104
2013	99
2012	79
2011	87
2010	94
2009	99
2008	106
2007	113
2000	115
1990	301
1985	334
