= Kirazalan, Yusufeli =

Kirazalan
- Village
- Location within Turkey
- Coordinates: 40°55′N 41°51′E
- Country: Turkey
- Province: Artvin
- District: Yusufeli
- Population (2021): 129
- Time zone: UTC+3 (TRT)

Kirazalan is a village in the Yusufeli District, Artvin Province, Turkey. Its population is 129 (2021).
