= Yusufeli =

- Municipality
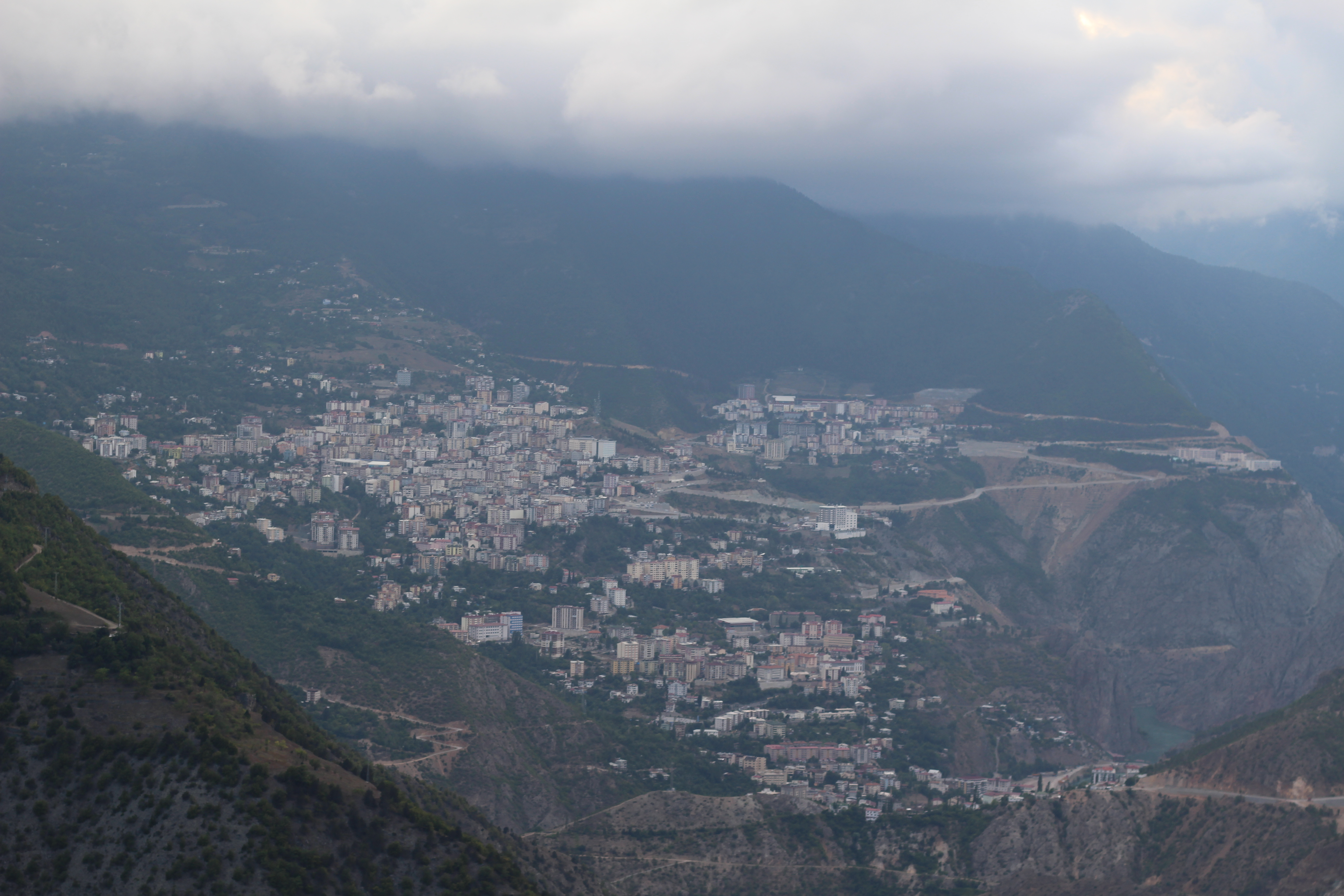
- Çoruh Valley, Yusufeli

- Location within Turkey
- Coordinates: 40°48′38″N 41°31′37″E
- Country: Turkey
- Province: Artvin
- District: Yusufeli

Government
  - Mayor: Barış Demirci (CHP)
- Elevation: 741 m (2,431 ft)
- Population (2021): 7,306
- Time zone: UTC+3 (TRT)
- Postal code: 08700
- Climate: Cfb
- Website: www.yusufeli.bel.tr

Yusufeli is a town and district of Artvin Province in the Black Sea region of Turkey. It is located on the bank of Çoruh River 104 km south-west of the city of Artvin, on the road to Erzurum. It is the seat of Yusufeli District. Its population is 7,306 (2021).

The town of Yusufeli sits in a valley where the Çoruh River is joined by the Barhal. To its north are the Kaçkar Mountains running east to west, with villages in other valleys between the mountains. The micro climate allows the cultivation of olives, grapes, and citrus fruits, the driving forces of the economy in addition to tourism. The town can be reached by air via Erzurum Airport, 135 km (84 mi) away from Yusufeli or by road from Artvin, Erzurum and Trabzon (via İspir in Erzurum Province).

There is a widely criticised plan to dam the Çoruh at Yusufeli, which would submerge 15,000 homes.

== Climate ==
Yusufeli has an oceanic climate (Köppen: Cfb).

Climate data for Yusufeli
Month	Jan	Feb	Mar	Apr	May	Jun	Jul	Aug	Sep	Oct	Nov	Dec	Year
Daily mean °C (°F)	0.5 (32.9)	2.0 (35.6)	5.7 (42.3)	11.0 (51.8)	15.0 (59.0)	18.4 (65.1)	21.6 (70.9)	21.6 (70.9)	18.4 (65.1)	13.3 (55.9)	8.0 (46.4)	3.0 (37.4)	11.5 (52.7)
Average precipitation mm (inches)	80 (3.1)	68 (2.7)	59 (2.3)	63 (2.5)	65 (2.6)	67 (2.6)	49 (1.9)	54 (2.1)	68 (2.7)	96 (3.8)	94 (3.7)	95 (3.7)	858 (33.7)
Source: Climate-Data.org

== History ==
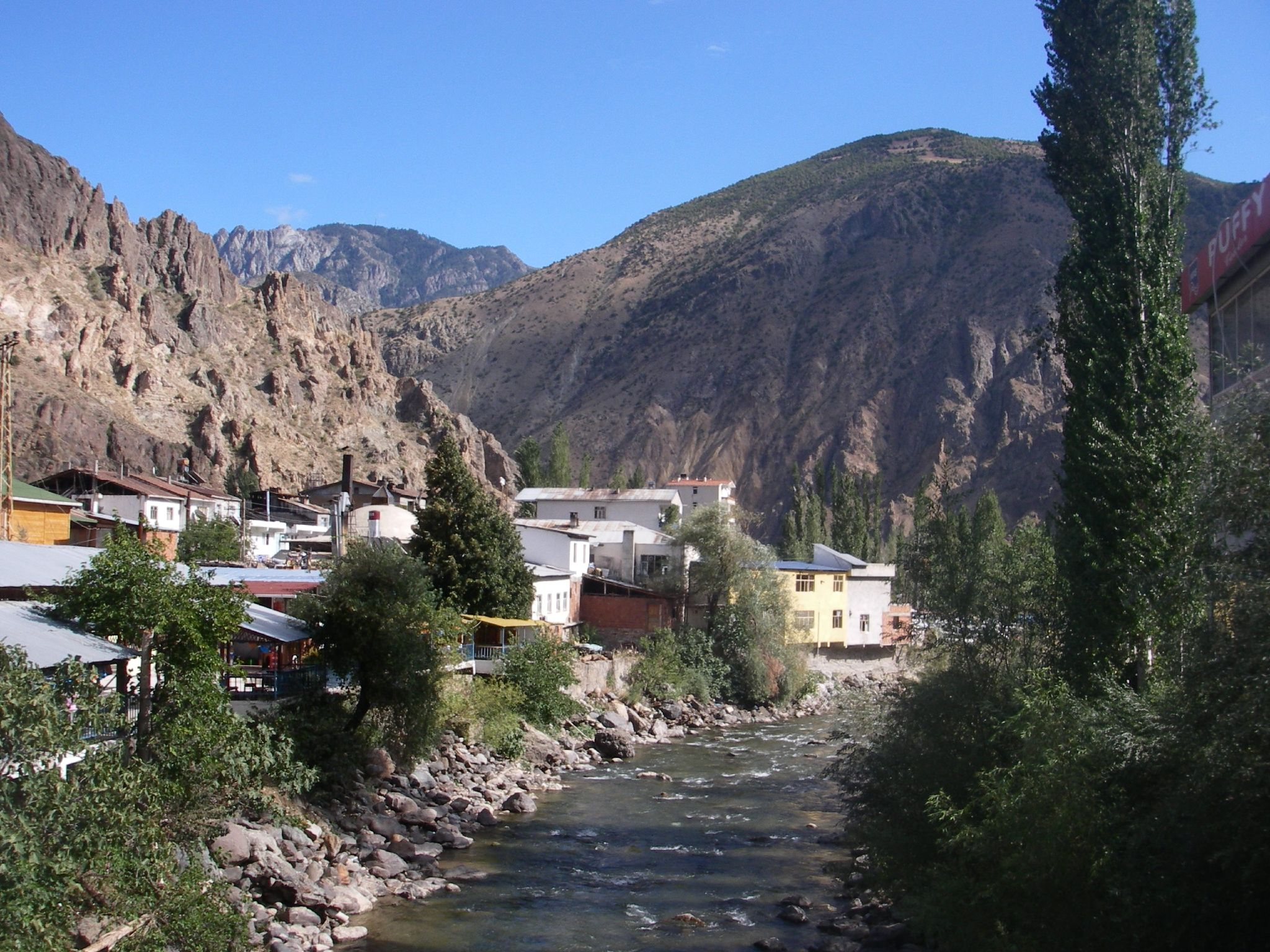

The history of Yusufeli, formerly Perterek or Pertarek, is traced to 3000 BC, the Bronze Age. The area has since been inhabited by Hurri, Urartu, Persians, Armenians, Ancient Romans, Byzantines and Georgians. In the Turkish era the area has been settled by Seljuks, Saltukids, Ilkhanids, Tamerlan, Akkoyunlu, Safavids and the Ottoman Empire. In the Kingdom of Armenia in antiquity it was part of Tayk province, known as the Canton of Arsiats por. In 1879 the area was the district of Kiskim in the eyalet of Çıldır. Then following the war between the Ottoman Empire and Russia it became a county of Erzurum. Most of the population is descended from Armenians or Georgians who converted to Islam in the 1700s.

Because of the rocky geography it was difficult for people from all villages to reach the city center, so a local district was established centred on Ögdem, but this was still inaccessible so Kılıçkaya (Ersis) became the center of county. Ersis means "a place where no boys live", so-called because so many sons of the district were lost in the Russo-Turkish War of 1878 and First World War. In the year 1912 the county name became Yusuf İli, i.e. "province of Yusuf" so the name Kiskim should not be confused with the name Keskin which was a county of Ankara at that time.

== Culture ==
The folk music and culture is typical of the Black Sea region featuring the clarinet type zurna, a drum and bagpipes.

There are a number of historical Georgian churches in the valleys of Yusufeli, including the ruins of the Four Churches (Dört Kilise) in a village off the road to İspir (Map).

== Places of interest ==
There are many medieval forts and Georgian churches in the valleys of Yusufeli. Some of them:

- Armashen fortress
- Ersis fortress
- Nihak fortress
- Oshnak fortress
- Ishan monastery
- Ogdem fortress
- Peterek fortress
- Parhal monastery
- Savangin, a pre-historical cave with an inscription written in an undeciphered writing system

== Notable natives ==
- The singer and politician Zülfü Livaneli was born into a family from Yusufeli.
- The former mayor of Istanbul, Kadir Topbaş, was born in Yusufeli.
