= Çeltikdüzü, Yusufeli =

Çeltikdüzü
- Village
- Location within Turkey
- Coordinates: 40°45′N 41°30′E
- Country: Turkey
- Province: Artvin
- District: Yusufeli
- Population (2021): 234
- Time zone: UTC+3 (TRT)

Çeltikdüzü is a village in the Yusufeli District, Artvin Province, Turkey. Its population is 234 (2021).
