= Güvercinli, Hopa =

Güvercinli
- Village
- Location within Turkey
- Coordinates: 41.3390°N 41.3782°E
- Country: Turkey
- Province: Artvin
- District: Hopa
- Population (2021): 143
- Time zone: UTC+3 (TRT)

Güvercinli (Laz language: Bucha; ბუჩა) is a village in the Hopa District, Artvin Province, Turkey. Its population is 143 (2021).
