= Çamlıca, Yusufeli =

Çamlıca
- Village
- Location within Turkey
- Coordinates: 40.9857°N 41.6482°E
- Country: Turkey
- Province: Artvin
- District: Yusufeli
- Population (2021): 86
- Time zone: UTC+3 (TRT)

Çamlıca is a village in the Yusufeli District, Artvin Province, Turkey. Its population is 86 (2021).
