= Güneşli, Hopa =

Güneşli
- Village
- Location within Turkey
- Coordinates: 41.3657°N 41.4728°E
- Country: Turkey
- Province: Artvin
- District: Hopa
- Population (2021): 118
- Time zone: UTC+3 (TRT)

Güneşli (Laz language: Tsagrina) is a village in the Hopa District, Artvin Province, Turkey. Its population is 118 (2021).
