= Çıralı, Yusufeli =

Çıralı
- Village
- Location within Turkey
- Coordinates: 40.9000°N 41.5800°E
- Country: Turkey
- Province: Artvin
- District: Yusufeli
- Population (2021): 122
- Time zone: UTC+3 (TRT)

Çıralı is a village in the Yusufeli District, Artvin Province, Turkey. Its population is 122 (2021).
