= Narlık, Yusufeli =

Narlık
- Village
- Location within Turkey
- Coordinates: 40.9926°N 41.7262°E
- Country: Turkey
- Province: Artvin
- District: Yusufeli
- Population (2021): 102
- Time zone: UTC+3 (TRT)

Narlık is a village in the Yusufeli District, Artvin Province, Turkey. Its population is 102 (2021).
