= Köprügören, Yusufeli =

Köprügören
- Village
- Location within Turkey
- Coordinates: 40°41′N 41°22′E
- Country: Turkey
- Province: Artvin
- District: Yusufeli
- Population (2021): 238
- Time zone: UTC+3 (TRT)

Köprügören is a village in the Yusufeli District, Artvin Province, Turkey. Its population is 238 (2021).
