= Gümüşözü, Yusufeli =

Gümüşözü
- Village
- Location within Turkey
- Coordinates: 40°41′N 41°46′E
- Country: Turkey
- Province: Artvin
- District: Yusufeli
- Population (2021): 42
- Time zone: UTC+3 (TRT)

Gümüşözü is a village in the Yusufeli District, Artvin Province, Turkey. Its population is 42 (2021).
