= İşhan, Yusufeli =

İşhan
- Village
- Location within Turkey
- Coordinates: 40°47′13″N 41°44′52″E
- Country: Turkey
- Province: Artvin
- District: Yusufeli
- Population (2021): 294
- Time zone: UTC+3 (TRT)

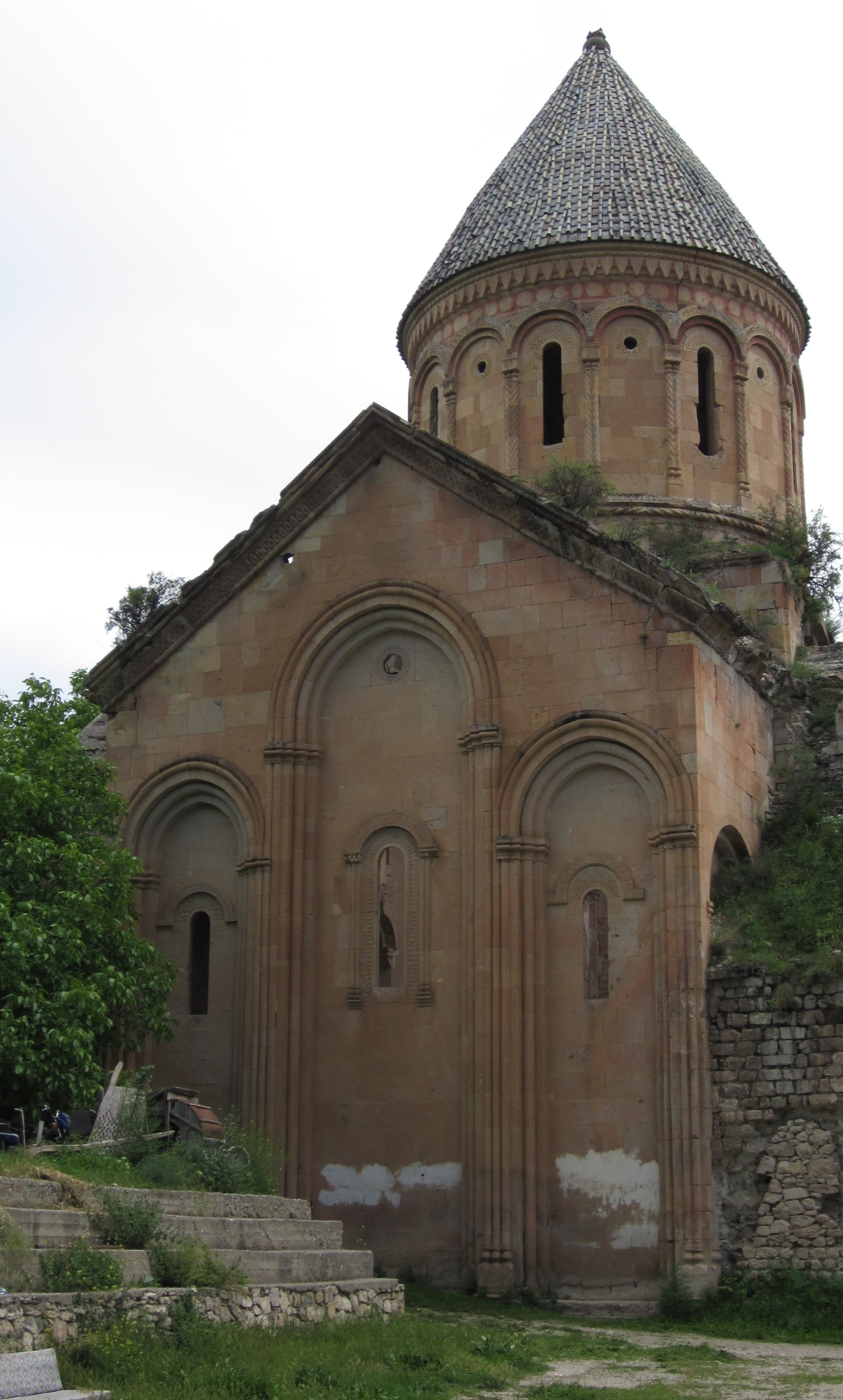
Ishkhani monastic church

İşhan is a village in the Yusufeli District, Artvin Province, Turkey. Its population is 294 (2021). The ruined Ishkhani monastery is situated in the village.
