= Demirköy, Yusufeli =

Demirköy
- Village
- Location within Turkey
- Coordinates: 40.9983°N 41.6757°E
- Country: Turkey
- Province: Artvin
- District: Yusufeli
- Population (2021): 116
- Time zone: UTC+3 (TRT)

Demirköy is a village in the Yusufeli District, Artvin Province, Turkey. Its population is 116 (2021).
