= Çamlı, Hopa =

Çamlı P̌eroniti
- Village
- Location within Turkey
- Coordinates: 41.3704°N 41.3790°E
- Country: Turkey
- Province: Artvin
- District: Hopa
- Population (2021): 496
- Time zone: UTC+3 (TRT)

Çamlı (Laz: პერონითი, romanized: P̌eroniti) is a village in the Hopa District, Artvin Province, Turkey. Its population is 496 (2021).
