= İnanlı, Yusufeli =

İnanlı
- Village
- Location within Turkey
- Coordinates: 40.8846°N 41.7140°E
- Country: Turkey
- Province: Artvin
- District: Yusufeli
- Population (2021): 21
- Time zone: UTC+3 (TRT)

İnanlı is a village in the Yusufeli District, Artvin Province, Turkey. Its population is 21 (2021).
