= Subaşı, Hopa =

Subaşı
- Village
- Location within Turkey
- Coordinates: 41°22′36″N 41°30′39″E
- Country: Turkey
- Province: Artvin
- District: Hopa
- Population (2021): 260
- Time zone: UTC+3 (TRT)

Subaşı (Laz name: İskaristi) is a village in the Hopa District, Artvin Province, Turkey. Its population is 260 (2021).
