= Bademkaya, Yusufeli =

Bademkaya
- Village
- Location within Turkey
- Coordinates: 41.0160°N 41.6943°E
- Country: Turkey
- Province: Artvin
- District: Yusufeli
- Population (2021): 62
- Time zone: UTC+3 (TRT)

Bademkaya is a village in the Yusufeli District, Artvin Province, Turkey. Its population is 62 (2021).

== History ==
The former name of Bademkaya was Zvari. This name is of Georgian origin and appears in historical sources as Zvari (ზვარი), derived from Mzvari, meaning "sunny place" or "sun-exposed area".

The settlement was part of the historical Tao region within Tao-Klarceti, a medieval Georgian cultural and political area. The Ottomans captured the region from Georgian control during the 1549 Ottoman–Georgian campaign. In Ottoman administrative records, the name appears as Zvar (زوار).

In Ottoman times, Zvari was initially part of Livane Sanjak and later included in the Çıldır Eyalet. In the 1835 Ottoman population register, it is recorded as a village of the Livane-i Ulya district, with 29 households and 75 males. Assuming an equal number of women, the total population is estimated at around 150 people.

According to the 1876 Trabzon Province yearbook, Zvari was part of the Livana district of the Lazistan Sanjak, with 20 households and 89 males (approximately 178 total inhabitants). Livestock included 16 oxen, 10 cows, 5 horses, 205 goats, and 100 sheep.

Following the 1878 Russo-Turkish War, the Livana region was ceded to Russia, and Zvari was transferred to the Kiskim district of Erzurum Province.

In 1928, the village appears in official records as part of the central subdistrict of Yusufeli, Artvin Province. In the 1935 census, it is recorded as "Zovar" in Erzurum Province with a population of 306. The name was officially changed to Bademkaya in 1959 under Law No. 7267.

In the 1965 census, Bademkaya had a population of 393, with 89 literate residents.

== Geography ==
Bademkaya is located 54 km from Artvin city centre and 51 km from Yusufeli district centre.

== Population ==
Population history of the village
2020	66
2019	65
2018	66
2017	80
2016	77
2015	81
2014	90
2013	82
2012	96
2011	96
2010	100
2009	91
2008	87
2007	90
2000	109
1990	177
1985	280
