= Havuzlu, Yusufeli =

Havuzlu
- Village
- Location within Turkey
- Coordinates: 40.8912°N 41.7061°E
- Country: Turkey
- Province: Artvin
- District: Yusufeli
- Population (2021): 35
- Time zone: UTC+3 (TRT)

Havuzlu is a village in the Yusufeli District, Artvin Province, Turkey. Its population is 35 (2021).
