= Alanbaşı, Yusufeli =

Alanbaşı
- Village
- Location within Turkey
- Coordinates: 40.6893°N 41.4111°E
- Country: Turkey
- Province: Artvin
- District: Yusufeli
- Elevation: 1,276 m (4,186 ft)
- Population (2021): 402
- Time zone: UTC+3 (TRT)
- Postal code: 08820
- Area code: 0466

Alanbaşı is a village in the Yusufeli District, Artvin Province, Turkey. Its population is 402 (2021).

== History ==
The former name of Alanbaşı is Kiskim or Kiskimi. It appears in Georgian sources as Kiskimi (კისკიმი), and in a 1574 Ottoman cadastral register (tahrir defteri) and in the Ottoman cebe defteri (1694–1732) as Kiskim (كسكم). On an 1854 Kiepert map it is written as "Gisgim". Kiskim was also the former name of an Ottoman sanjak and of the Yusufeli district (kaza).

Kiskim lies in Tao, one of the regions that made up Georgia in the Middle Ages; the Ottomans took the region and the village from the Georgians in the mid-16th century. The Kiskimi Chapel, located in the village's Kansasi quarter and dated to the 9th century during the Georgian kingdom period, indicates that Kiskim was an old settlement.

During the Ottoman cadastral survey of 1574, Kiskim was one of the villages of the Pertekrek nahiye of the Tortum sanjak, within the Çıldır Eyalet. At that time it was a large settlement of 256 Christian households. Heva—today a quarter of Kiskim village known as "Bağlık" or "Hav Bağları"—was then a separate village.

In the cebe defteri of the Çıldır Eyalet covering 1694–1732, the village appears as Kiskim (كسكم). Located in the Pertekrek liva, its revenue in AH 1124 (1712/1713) was 202,240 akçe and was assigned as a has to Hasan Bey, mirliva of Pertekrek and Nisf-i Livane. In AH 1142 (1729/1730) its revenue was recorded as 519,390 akçe and assigned as a has to İbrahim Bey, mirliva of Pertekrek and Nisf-i Livane.

In the census of 1835—when the Ottoman administration recorded only the male population for conscription and taxation—Kiskim was one of the villages of the Kiskim sanjak. Recorded as "Nefs-i Kiskim," the village had 297 men in 117 households; adding an equal number of women, its population is estimated at 594. The Kiskim sanjak itself comprised 21 villages, with 3,116 men in 1,173 households, suggesting a total population of about 6,232.

In the 1928 Ottoman village list, the village was recorded as Keskim/Kiskim (كسكیم), attached to the central nahiye of the Yusufeli district of Artvin Province. In the 1940 general census, recorded as "Kıskim," it held the same administrative position within Çoruh Province, with a population of 812. Because Kiskim or Keskim was not Turkish, the village's name was changed to Alanbaşı in 1959 under Law No. 7267. In the 1965 general census, the population of Alanbaşı was 998, of whom 515 were literate.

=== Hav Bağları ===
Formerly a village in its own right, Hevi or Heva is today a quarter of Alanbaşı known as "Bağlık" or "Hav Bağları." The old name Hevi (ხევი) or Heva (ხევა) derives from the Georgian word meaning "stream" or "valley." Hevi is also the name of a historical region in Georgia. The settlement on the bank of the Çoruh River was written as "Hav" (خاو) in an early Ottoman record.

According to the Ottoman cadastral register of 1555, Hevi was a village of the Pertekrek sanjak with 4 Christian households, where wheat, barley, millet, grapes, fruit, cotton and beans were cultivated, alongside market gardening, beekeeping and chestnut growing. In the 1574 Ottoman detailed register Defter-i Mufassal-i Vilayet-i Gürcistan, it appears as "Heva," attached to the Pertekrek nahiye of the Tortum sanjak, with 17 households. The villagers later converted to Islam, and in a 1652 cizye register all were recorded as Muslim. In the 1848 population register of Erzurum Province, Hav or Hevi was recorded not as a separate village but as a quarter of Kiskim.

=== Historic structures ===
Within Alanbaşı there are two churches, the remains of two castles, and a cave. One of the two churches, the Kiskimi Chapel, dates from the 9th century yet survives largely intact. A second church, located 1 km south of the village at a place the villagers call "Ançirtik," is a small single-naved structure; built of roughly hewn stone with lime mortar, its north-western part survives. Of the two castles, the Kiskimi Castle is thought, from its position and size, to have served mainly as a watchpost in the Middle Ages. The other castle stands on a ridge outside the settlement; built of roughly hewn stone and lime mortar, its surviving walls reach 2 metres in height, and the villagers regard the structure as a church.

== Geography ==
The village is 144 km from the provincial centre of Artvin and 39 km from the district centre of Yusufeli.

== Population ==
Village population by year
2021	402
2020	405
2019	396
2018	400
2017	391
2016	416
2015	438
2014	434
2013	454
2012	446
2011	465
2010	441
2009	427
2008	427
2007	390
2000	629
1990	783
1985	949
