= Esendal, Yusufeli =

Esendal
- Village
- Location within Turkey
- Coordinates: 40°56′N 41°35′E
- Country: Turkey
- Province: Artvin
- District: Yusufeli
- Population (2021): 140
- Time zone: UTC+3 (TRT)

Esendal is a village in the Yusufeli District, Artvin Province, Turkey. Its population is 140 (2021).
