= Pamukçular, Yusufeli =

Pamukçular
- Village
- Location within Turkey
- Coordinates: 40°47′N 41°50′E
- Country: Turkey
- Province: Artvin
- District: Yusufeli
- Population (2021): 521
- Time zone: UTC+3 (TRT)

Pamukçular is a village in the Yusufeli District, Artvin Province, Turkey. Its population is 521 (2021).
