= Çevreli, Yusufeli =

Çevreli
- Village
- Location within Turkey
- Coordinates: 40.7820°N 41.4396°E
- Country: Turkey
- Province: Artvin
- District: Yusufeli
- Population (2021): 667
- Time zone: UTC+3 (TRT)

Çevreli is a village in the Yusufeli District, Artvin Province, Turkey. Its population is 667 (2021).
