= Mutlugün, Yusufeli =

Mutlugün
- Village
- Location within Turkey
- Country: Turkey
- Province: Artvin
- District: Yusufeli
- Population (2021): 123
- Time zone: UTC+3 (TRT)

Mutlugün is a village in the Yusufeli District, Artvin Province, Turkey. Its population is 123 (2021).
