= Özgüven, Yusufeli =

Özgüven
- Village
- Location within Turkey
- Coordinates: 41°01′N 41°24′E
- Country: Turkey
- Province: Artvin
- District: Yusufeli
- Population (2021): 68
- Time zone: UTC+3 (TRT)

Özgüven is a village in the Yusufeli District, Artvin Province, Turkey. Its population is 68 (2021).
