= Morkaya, Yusufeli =

Morkaya
- Village
- Location in Turkey
- Coordinates: 40°44′N 41°36′E
- Country: Turkey
- Province: Artvin
- District: Yusufeli
- Elevation: 1,532 m (5,026 ft)
- Population (2021): 398
- Time zone: UTC+3 (TRT)
- Postal code: 08820
- Area code: 0466

Morkaya is a village in the Yusufeli District, Artvin Province, Turkey. Its population is 398 (2021).

== History ==
The earlier name of Morkaya appears in Turkish sources as Lok or Lök. It was recorded under the name Lok/Lök (لوك) in an 1835 population register and in a 1928 Ottoman-era list of villages.

Tao, where Lok or Lök is located, was one of the regions that made up Georgia in the Middle Ages. The Ottomans took the region from Georgian rule in the mid-16th century. The ruined churches within the village's boundaries indicate that it was an old settlement site.

In 1835, when the Ottoman administration recorded only the male population for the purposes of conscription and taxation, the village of Lok was attached to the sanjak of Kiskim and consisted of 27 households. At that time, 52 men lived in the village. Adding an equal number of women, the total population of Lok is estimated to have been about 102 people.

In the 1928 Ottoman list of villages, Lok or Lök was one of the villages in the central nahiye of the Yusufeli district (kaza) of Artvin Province. In the 1940 general census, the village—recorded as "Lök"—was attached to the central nahiye of the Yusufeli district of Çoruh Province, with a population of 936. Because Lok or Lök was not Turkish, the village's name was changed to Morkaya in 1959 under Law No. 7267. In the 1965 general census, the population of Morkaya was 1,057, of whom 309 were literate.

The remains of three churches survive within the boundaries of Morkaya. One of them stands on a rocky ridge 1 km east of the village; this structure was built using rough-hewn stone with lime mortar. Another church is located in the village's Kuzey quarter. Known as the Lok Church, a single-naved church, it has an adjoining structure on its southern façade. At the site the villagers call "Tazar," only mortar and building stones remain of the church. The naming of the church's location as "Tazar" (ტაძარი, tadzari), meaning "church" in Georgian, indicates that the church and its congregation were Georgian.

== Geography ==
The village is 138 km from the provincial centre of Artvin and 32 km from the district centre of Yusufeli.

== Population ==
Village population by year
2021	398
2020	407
2019	434
2018	479
2017	405
2016	414
2015	405
2014	445
2013	437
2012	434
2011	423
2010	438
2009	443
2008	444
2007	216
2000	403
1990	814
1985	964
