= Tarakçılar, Yusufeli =

Tarakçılar
- Village
- Location within Turkey
- Coordinates: 40°56′N 41°44′E
- Country: Turkey
- Province: Artvin
- District: Yusufeli
- Population (2021): 60
- Time zone: UTC+3 (TRT)

Tarakçılar is a village in the Yusufeli District, Artvin Province, Turkey. Its population is 60 (2021).
