= Yoldere, Hopa =

Yoldere
- Village
- Location within Turkey
- Coordinates: 41.3918°N 41.4654°E
- Country: Turkey
- Province: Artvin
- District: Hopa
- Population (2021): 441
- Time zone: UTC+3 (TRT)

Yoldere (Laz language: Zurpici) is a village in the Hopa District, Artvin Province, Turkey. Its population is 441 (2021).
