= Bıçakçılar, Yusufeli =

Bıçakçılar
- Village
- Location within Turkey
- Coordinates: 41°02′N 41°26′E
- Country: Turkey
- Province: Artvin
- District: Yusufeli
- Population (2021): 468
- Time zone: UTC+3 (TRT)

Bıçakçılar is a village in the Yusufeli District, Artvin Province, Turkey. Its population is 468 (2021).
