= Altıparmak, Yusufeli =

Altıparmak is a village in the Yusufeli District, Artvin Province, Turkey.

The historical name of Altıparmak village, Parhali (ფარხალი / პარხალი), is derived from the Georgian word "parehi" (ფარეხი), meaning sheepfold, and signifies pasture.
