= Bostancı, Yusufeli =

Bostancı
- Village
- Location within Turkey
- Coordinates: 40.9628°N 41.5353°E
- Country: Turkey
- Province: Artvin
- District: Yusufeli
- Elevation: 1,532 m (5,026 ft)
- Population (2021): 455
- Time zone: UTC+3 (TRT)
- Postal code: 08820
- Area code: 0466

Bostancı is a village in the Yusufeli District, Artvin Province, Turkey. Its population is 455 (2021).

== History ==
The former name of Bostancı was Utavi. This Georgian place name (უთავი) may have changed from Rutavi (რუთავი), meaning "head of the channel." The Georgian archaeologist and historian Ekvtime Takaishvili wrote in 1917 that an old channel in the Parkhali valley began in the village of Utavi. The name Utavi entered Turkish as Utav (اوطاو).

Tao, where Utavi is located, is one of the regions that made up medieval Georgia. The Ottomans took the region and the settlement from the Georgians in the mid-16th century. Utavi Fortress, located in the village of Utavi, was the centre of the Ottoman administrative unit of the sanjak of Livane, which covered part of the former Georgian region. The bey of the Livane sanjak, Mehmed Bey, resided at Utavi Fortress; at this time the fortress was in ruins. Because the village had been granted as a yurtluk and ocaklık (hereditary fief), it does not appear in the 1574 Ottoman detailed register Defter-i Mufassal-i Vilayet-i Gürcistan.

In the 1835 Ottoman population survey, the village of Utavi was attached to the Livane-i Ulya sanjak within the Çıldır Eyalet. In this survey, in which only the male population was recorded, the village of Utav, together with its surrounding quarters, had 548 men recorded in 148 households; adding an equal number of women, the village's total population is estimated at 1,096.

After remaining within the Çıldır Eyalet for a long period, Utavi was attached in the 19th century first to Trabzon Eyalet and, from 1867, to Trabzon Vilayet. It was one of the villages of the Livana kaza, attached to the Lazistan sanjak of this vilayet. In the 1876 yearbook of Trabzon Province, the village's population was recorded as 586 people in 126 households.

According to information given by Ekvtime Takaishvili based on his 1917 research expedition to the Parkhali valley, an old water channel existed in the upper villages of the valley. Several kilometres long, this channel began at the village of Utavi and reached the village of Zavrieti. At this time, Utavi was one of the villages in the Parkhali valley where Georgian was spoken.

In the 1928 Ottoman village list, the village of Utavi, recorded under the name "Utav" (اوطاو), was attached to the central nahiye of the Yusufeli kaza of Erzurum Province. In the 1940 general census, the village of Utav held the same administrative position within Çoruh Province, with a population of 1,164. Because Utavi or Utav was not Turkish, the village's name was changed to Bostancı in 1959 under Law No. 7267. In the 1965 general census, the population of Bostancı was 1,323, of whom 284 were literate.

The only historical structure surviving in the village of Utavi today is Utavi Fortress. High walls remain from this fortress, and the cistern inside it has also survived to the present day.

== Geography ==
The village of Bostancı is 131 km from the provincial centre of Artvin and 26 km from the district centre of Yusufeli.

== Population ==
Village population by year
2021	455
2020	463
2019	467
2018	475
2017	463
2016	478
2015	500
2014	534
2013	554
2012	574
2011	589
2010	610
2009	660
2008	679
2007	699
2000	716
1990	1,000
1985	1,274
