= Kömürlü, Yusufeli =

Kömürlü
- Village
- Location within Turkey
- Coordinates: 40.8951°N 41.6605°E
- Country: Turkey
- Province: Artvin
- District: Yusufeli
- Population (2021): 74
- Time zone: UTC+3 (TRT)

Kömürlü is a village in the Yusufeli District, Artvin Province, Turkey. Its population is 74 (2021).
