= Demirkent, Yusufeli =

Demirkent
- Village
- Location within Turkey
- Coordinates: 40.8791°N 41.7295°E
- Country: Turkey
- Province: Artvin
- District: Yusufeli
- Population (2021): 277
- Time zone: UTC+3 (TRT)

Demirkent is a village in the Yusufeli District, Artvin Province, Turkey. Its population is 277 (2021).
