= Yüksekoba, Yusufeli =

Yüksekoba
- Village
- Location within Turkey
- Coordinates: 41°04′N 41°27′E
- Country: Turkey
- Province: Artvin
- District: Yusufeli
- Population (2021): 72
- Time zone: UTC+3 (TRT)

Yüksekoba is a village in the Yusufeli District, Artvin Province, Turkey. Its population is 72 (2021).
