= Çifteköprü, Borçka =

Çifteköprü Jurxinci
- Village
- Location within Turkey
- Coordinates: 41.3878°N 41.5668°E
- Country: Turkey
- Province: Artvin
- District: Borçka
- Population (2021): 261
- Time zone: UTC+3 (TRT)

Çifteköprü is a village in the Borçka District, Artvin Province, Turkey. Its population is 261 (2021).

== History ==
According to list of villages in Laz language book (2009), name of the village is Jurxinci, which means "double bridge". Most villagers are ethnically Laz.
