= Çavuşlu, Hopa =

Çavuşlu
- Village
- Location within Turkey
- Coordinates: 41.3886°N 41.4971°E
- Country: Turkey
- Province: Artvin
- District: Hopa
- Population (2021): 338
- Time zone: UTC+3 (TRT)

Çavuşlu is a village in the Hopa District, Artvin Province, Turkey. Its population is 338 (2021).
