= Küplüce, Yusufeli =

Küplüce
- Village
- Location within Turkey
- Coordinates: 40.9166°N 41.5120°E
- Country: Turkey
- Province: Artvin
- District: Yusufeli
- Population (2021): 134
- Time zone: UTC+3 (TRT)

Küplüce is a village in the Yusufeli District, Artvin Province, Turkey. Its population is 134 (2021).
