= Balcılı, Yusufeli =

Balcılı
- Village
- Location within Turkey
- Coordinates: 41.0298°N 41.4409°E
- Country: Turkey
- Province: Artvin
- District: Yusufeli
- Elevation: 2,094 m (6,870 ft)
- Population (2021): 101
- Time zone: UTC+3 (TRT)
- Postal code: 08820
- Area code: 0466

Balcılı is a village in the Yusufeli District, Artvin Province, Turkey. Its population is 101 (2021).

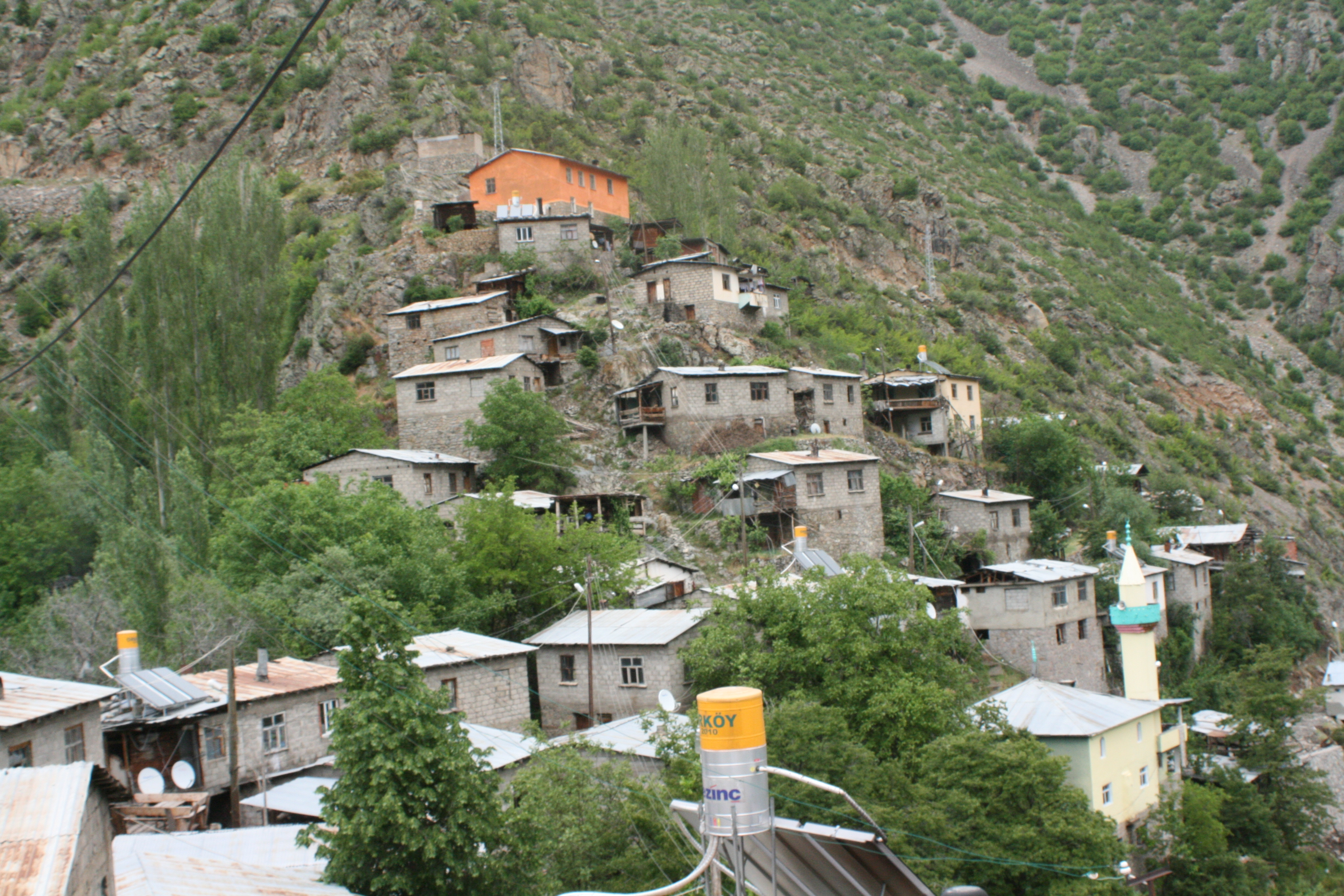
Balcılı

== History ==
The former name of Balcılı in Georgian sources is Balhi. Balhi (ბალხი) appears as a place name in the epic Amiraniani (ამირანიანი), which tells of the struggle between the Georgian mythological hero Amirani and God. This place name entered Turkish as Balh; it is recorded as such (بالخ) in an 1835 Ottoman population register and in the 1876 yearbook of Trabzon Province.

The village of Balhi is located in the historical Tao region, one of the regions that made up medieval Georgia. The Ottomans took the region and the village from the Georgians in the mid-16th century. Georgian-language neighbourhood and locality names in the village—including Abazianni (აბაზიანნი), Balhibari (ბალხიბარი), Balhibari Tke (ბალხიბარი ტყე), Gaghmi Kanebi (გაღმი ყანები), Didakho (დიდახო), and Tzitelkari (წითელკარი)—likely also date from this period.

In the 1835 Ottoman population register, the village of Balhi, recorded as "Balh," was one of the villages of the Kavkaseti nahiye of the Livane-i Ulya sanjak within the Çıldır Eyalet. In this census, conducted by the Ottoman administration for taxation and conscription purposes, the village had 230 men in 65 households; adding an equal number of women, the total population of Balh is estimated at 460.

Balhi was later attached to Trabzon Province. According to the 1876 yearbook of Trabzon Province, it was a village of the Livana kaza of the Lazistan Sanjak. Its population consisted of 192 people in 61 households; since the Ottoman administration recorded only the male population at this time as well, adding an equal female population indicates that 384 people lived in Balhi, an average of 6.3 people per household. Both the village's overall population and its average household size appear to have decreased. The farming population's livestock holdings were recorded as 30 oxen, 30 cows, 3 horses, 400 goats, and 395 sheep. After most of the Livana kaza was ceded to Russia following the 93 War (1877–1878), Balhi remained within Ottoman borders and was attached to the Kiskim kaza.

In the 1928 Ottoman village list, the settlement, recorded as "Balh" (بالح), was one of the villages of the central nahiye of the Yusufeli kaza of Artvin Province. The village held the same administrative position in the 1935 general census, although at that time the Yusufeli kaza was attached to Erzurum Province; its population was 476. Because the name Balhi or Balh was considered to be "of foreign origin," it was changed to Balcılı in 1959 under Law No. 7267. In the 1965 general census, the population of Balcılı was 510, of whom 101 were literate.

The irrigation channel in Balcılı known as the Savrieti Canal is believed to have been built during the 10th century, in the period of the Kingdom of Georgia. However, like many historical structures in the Tao-Klarjeti region, the canal is popularly attributed to Queen Tamar. Cut through a rock mass and still in use today, the Balhi Canal, or Savrieti Canal, is for this reason also known as the "Tamara Canal." The village also has a single-storey mosque with one minaret, built in 1828.

== Geography ==
Balcılı is 131 km from the provincial centre of Artvin and 26 km from the district centre of Yusufeli.

== Population ==
Village population by year
2021	101
2020	104
2019	118
2018	187
2017	60
2016	60
2015	59
2014	79
2013	110
2012	126
2011	157
2010	145
2009	137
2008	134
2007	154
2000	179
1990	325
1985	423
