= Bakırtepe, Yusufeli =

Bakırtepe
- Village
- Location within Turkey
- Coordinates: 40.6583°N 41.4583°E
- Country: Turkey
- Province: Artvin
- District: Yusufeli
- Population (2021): 120
- Time zone: UTC+3 (TRT)

Bakırtepe is a village in the Yusufeli District, Artvin Province, Turkey. Its population is 120 (2021).

== History ==
Bakırtepe's former name was Tungens. The village was listed in the 1928 Ottoman Turkish village list as Tungens or Tüngens (تونكنس). This place name is written in Georgian as Tungensi (თუნგენსი).

Tungens was located in Tao, one of the regions that made up medieval Georgia. The Ottomans captured this region from the Georgians in the mid-16th century. However, the settlement's name does not appear in early Ottoman records.

Tungens was one of the villages in the central nahiye of Yusufeli district in Artvin Province in 1928. In the 1940 general census, the village, written as "Tünges", was in the central nahiye of Yusufeli kaza of Çoruh Province and had a population of 384. In Turkish sources, the village name was written as Türgens, Tünkes, and Tünges; because it was considered to be of foreign origin, it was changed to Bakırtepe in 1959 under Law No. 7267. In the 1965 general census, Bakırtepe had a population of 471, of whom 261 were literate.

== Geography ==
Bakırtepe is 146 km from Artvin and 41 km from Yusufeli. Aros Yaylası, where Karakucak wrestling is held every year, is located in this village.

== Population ==
Population history of the village
| 2021 | 120 |
| 2020 | 123 |
| 2019 | 131 |
| 2018 | 158 |
| 2017 | 105 |
| 2016 | 109 |
| 2015 | 121 |
| 2014 | 138 |
| 2013 | 154 |
| 2012 | 124 |
| 2011 | 125 |
| 2010 | 116 |
| 2009 | 109 |
| 2008 | 128 |
| 2007 | 142 |
| 2000 | 130 |
| 1990 | 234 |
| 1985 | 243 |
