= Zeytincik, Yusufeli =

Zeytincik
- Village
- Location within Turkey
- Coordinates: 40.9670°N 41.7582°E
- Country: Turkey
- Province: Artvin
- District: Yusufeli
- Population (2021): 34
- Time zone: UTC+3 (TRT)

Zeytincik is a village in the Yusufeli District, Artvin Province, Turkey. Its population is 34 (2021).
