= Taşkıran, Yusufeli =

Taşkıran
- Village
- Location within Turkey
- Coordinates: 40.948°N 41.4727°E
- Country: Turkey
- Province: Artvin
- District: Yusufeli
- Population (2021): 314
- Time zone: UTC+3 (TRT)

Taşkıran is a village in the Yusufeli District, Artvin Province, Turkey. Its population is 314 (2021).
