= Yaylalar, Yusufeli =

Yaylalar
- Village
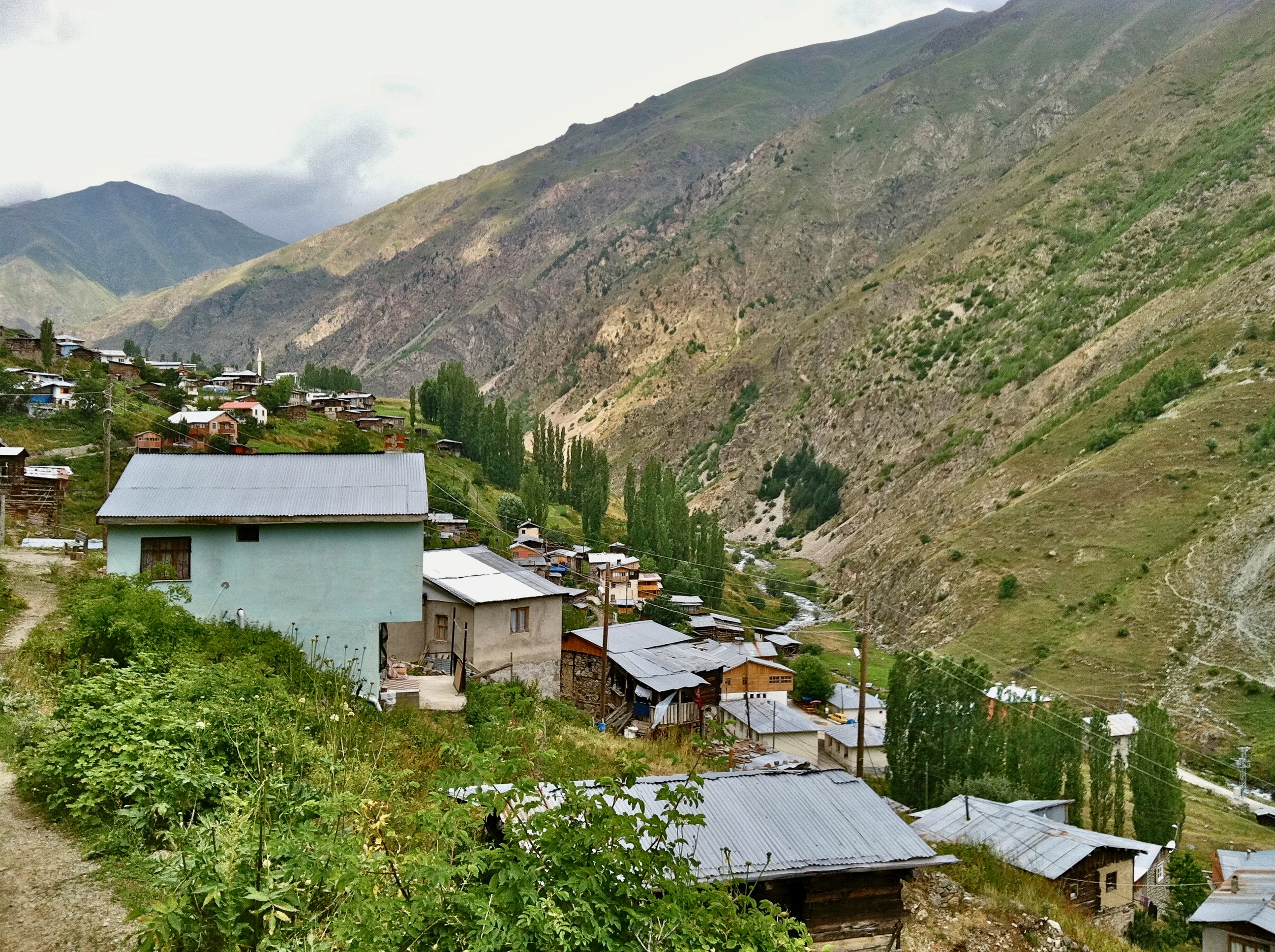
- Yaylalar in 2011, looking west up the Büyük Cay valley

- Location within Turkey
- Coordinates: 40.8690°N 41.2722°E
- Country: Turkey
- Province: Artvin
- District: Yusufeli
- Population (2021): 165
- Time zone: UTC+3 (TRT)

Yaylalar is a village in the Yusufeli District, Artvin Province, Turkey. Its population is 165 (2021).
