= Demirdöven, Yusufeli =

Demirdöven
- Village
- Location within Turkey
- Coordinates: 40.9206°N 41.3500°E
- Country: Turkey
- Province: Artvin
- District: Yusufeli
- Population (2021): 71
- Time zone: UTC+3 (TRT)

Demirdöven is a village in the Yusufeli District, Artvin Province, Turkey. Its population is 71 (2021).
