= Yusufeli District =

District of Artvin Province, Turkey

- District
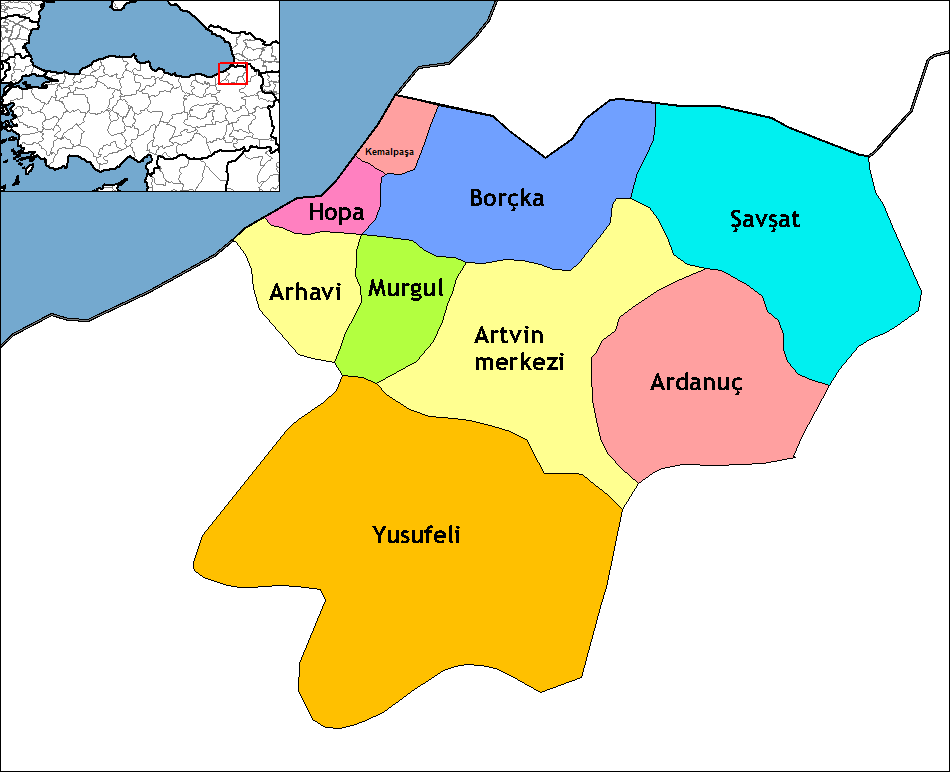
- Map showing Yusufeli District in Artvin Province

- Location in Turkey
- Coordinates: 40°49′N 41°32′E
- Country: Turkey
- Province: Artvin
- Seat: Yusufeli

Government
  - Kaymakam: Hüseyin Kaptan
- Area: 2,261 km^{2} (873 sq mi)
- Population (2021): 19,510
  - Density: 8.629/km^{2} (22.35/sq mi)
- Time zone: UTC+3 (TRT)
- Website: www.yusufeli.gov.tr

Yusufeli District is a district of Artvin Province of Turkey. Its seat is the town Yusufeli. Its area is 2,261 km^{2}, and its population is 19,510 (2021).

== History ==
Location to the Barhal Church and Ishan Fortress, and other ancient structures reflecting the area's Byzantine and Ottoman past.

== Composition ==
There is one municipality in Yusufeli District:

- Yusufeli

There are 63 villages in Yusufeli District:

- Alanbaşı
- Altıparmak
- Arpacık
- Avcılar
- Bademkaya
- Bahçeli
- Bakırtepe
- Balalan
- Balcılı
- Bıçakçılar
- Bostancı
- Boyalı
- Çağlıyan
- Çamlıca
- Çeltikdüzü
- Cevizlik
- Çevreli
- Çıralı
- Dağeteği
- Darıca
- Demirdöven
- Demirkent
- Demirköy
- Dereiçi
- Dokumacılar
- Erenköy
- Esendal
- Esenyaka
- Gümüşözü
- Günyayla
- Havuzlu
- İnanlı
- Irmakyanı
- İşhan
- Kılıçkaya
- Kınalıçam
- Kirazalan
- Kömürlü
- Köprügören
- Küplüce
- Meşecik
- Morkaya
- Mutlugün
- Narlık
- Öğdem
- Ormandibi
- Özgüven
- Pamukçular
- Sebzeciler
- Serinsu
- Sütlüce
- Tarakçılar
- Taşkıran
- Tekkale
- Yağcılar
- Yamaçüstü
- Yarbaşı
- Yaylalar
- Yeniköy
- Yokuşlu
- Yüksekoba
- Yüncüler
- Zeytincik
