= Naldöken =

Naldöken can refer to:

- Naldöken, Ardanuç
- Naldöken, Ayvacık
- Naldöken, Maden
- Naldöken railway station
