= Kvajvari =

A kvajvari (Georgian: ქვაჯვარი, romanized: kvajvari) is a monumental stele in the shape of a cross in the Georgian Orthodox Christian tradition. The word kvajvari is composed of the words "kva" (ქვა), i.e. stone, and ‘jvari’ (ჯვარი), meaning cross, resulting "cross stone". The kvajvari steles became prominent after the Christianization of the Georgian kingdom of Iberia in the early 4th century, during the reign of King Mirian III. (Note: Most of the kvajvari stela promotion within Georgia was organized by the ruling class and aristocracy, particularly active being during erismtavari and presiding prince, Stephen I, when Georgian monarchy was, ironically, in abeyance.) Dozens of medieval kvajvari slabs survive to this day, but most of them are considerably damaged and fragmental. The tradition of erecting monumental crosses in the open air (Note: This tradition might have been connected with the miracle of the Feast of the Cross.) was widespread in Georgia, as it was similarly practiced in the Holy Land and in Eastern Christendom. The earliest kvajvari stelas are dated 5th century. Many medieval kvajvari stelas depicted the Bolnisi cross. A kvajvari stele was carved and erected with or (Note: Most of the kvajvari stelas without a pedestal are dated from the 5th to the 6th centuries, while predominantly pedestalized kvajvari stelas would become more dominant thereafter, and being utilized till the end of the 10th century.) without a pedestal.

== History ==
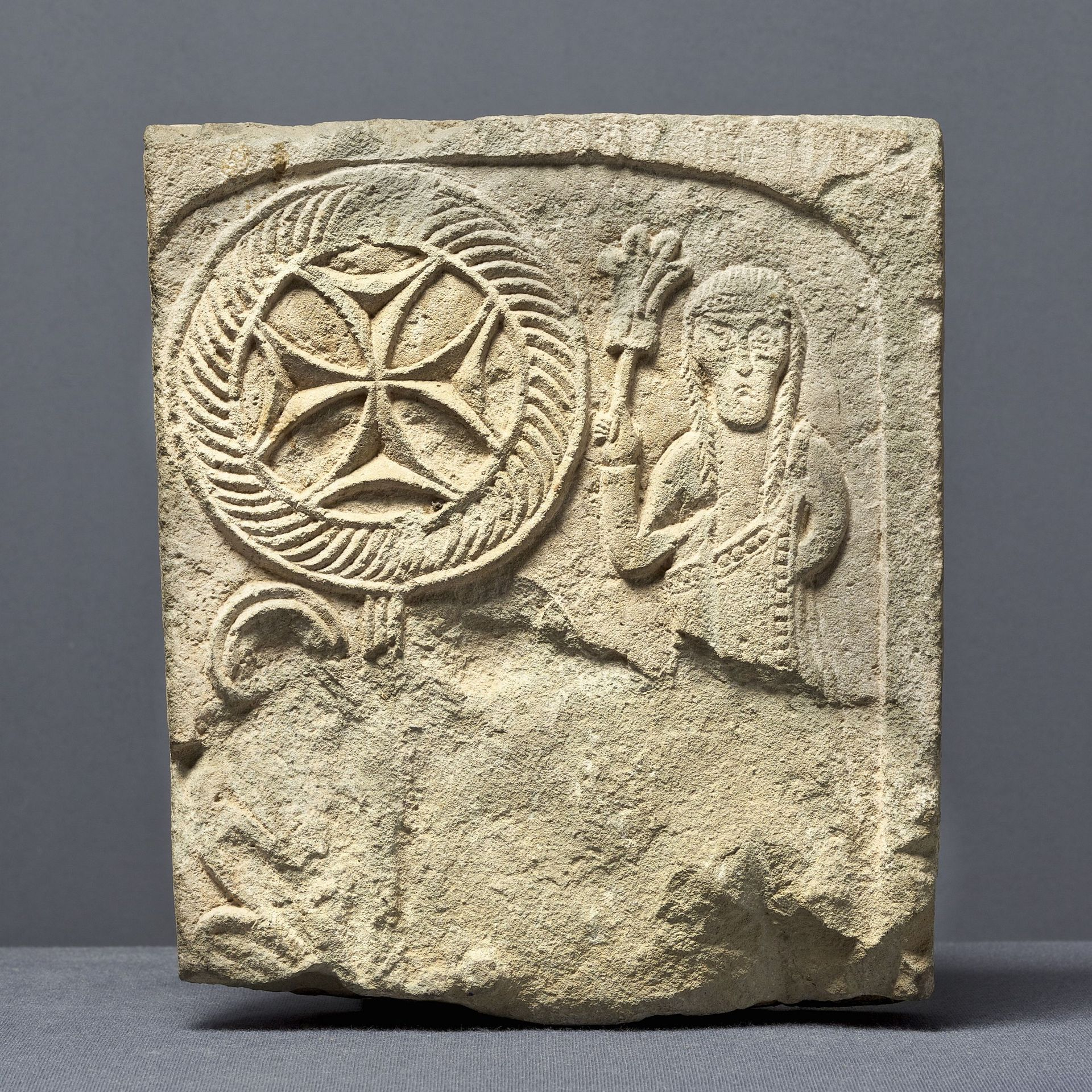
The kvajvari stele of Samtsevrisi depicting veneration of the Bolnisi cross, dated end of the 5th century. The votive kvajvari slab depicts an Iberian nobleman with a flower insignia in his hand, dressed in an official Byzantine dress. The kvajvari was originally erected on a large pole.

The tip of the kvajvari was inserted into a stone pedestal to keep it firmly in place at the head of the grave. Although commonly used as a gravestone, this monumental stone was also erected as a marker of a place of worship or to commemorate an important religious event that took place there. Such stones have been found in the Lower Kartli and Upper Kartli regions since the early Christian period. Located in the village of Gudarekhi in the Kvemo Kartli (Lower Kartli) region, it is one of the notable monuments dating back to the 13th century. The kvajvari also bore an inscription. Few examples of kvajvari have survived to the present day, including those from the region known as Tao-Klarjeti, which lies within the borders of Turkey on the historical Georgian lands.

Within the borders of Tao-Klarjeti, in 1904, Nikolay Marr, who was traveling through the Shavsheti and Klarjeti regions, discovered a whitish cross stone in the upper reaches of Norgieli (today Çakıllar), in a place called "Kollu Taş" (ქოლიტაში). It is understood from this discovery that the name "Kollu Taş" (stone with arms) refers to "kvajvari", as kvajvaris were called "kollu taş" in this region. According to the information provided by Marr, the cross stones found at Kollu Taş were blown up, but some remained intact. Marr also mentioned three large cross stones leaning against the wall next to the entrance door of the Armenian church in the village of Tandzoti. These stones had been brought by the priest of the church from the village of Gulija (today Ballı), which was inhabited by Turks at that time. Marr also photographed the cross stone in the village of Norgieli, which was inhabited by Georgians at that time.

Outside the Klarjeti and Shavsheti regions in Turkey, but within the borders of Tao-Klarjeti, a cross stone bearing a Georgian inscription was discovered by archaeologist Sami Patacı in the village of Kumlukoz (historical name Ghvime) in the district of Posof in Turkey. Found in a field, this cross stone bears an inscription written in the Asomtavruli characters of the Georgian alphabet, which mentions the name "Zakaria". According to Georgian historian Buba Kudava, the inscription reads [ღმრთისმშობე]ლო, / მ[ეო]ხ / ეყ[ა]ვ / ს[უ]ლ [ს]ა / ზ[ა]ქ[ა] / რ[ია]ს / ა, / ა[მი]ნ ("Virgin Mary, protect the soul of Zachariah. Amen.") and can be dated to the 10th–11th centuries. In the historical region of Erusheti, in the village of Yukarıaydere, which today belongs to the district of Hanak, there are two ancient stones in a villager's house that belong to the Christian past of the village. One of them is a kvajvari, which has survived to the present day in a broken state. It bears part of a Georgian prayer text. The text, written in the Asomtavruli script of the Georgian alphabet, reads [...] / ლ[ო]ცვ / ას / ამ[ო] / მ[ი]ჴს[ე] / ნ[ე]თ and has been dated to the 13th–14th centuries. In the historical Tao region, in the village of Köroğlu, which is now part of the Şenkaya district and was formerly known as Thaskurki, the lower branch of the kvajvari has been broken. The Georgian Asomtavruli inscription on the stone asks Saint George to forgive someone (წ[მიდა]ო / გ[იორგ]ი / შ[ეიწყალ]ე / გ[ლა]ხ[ა]კი /... // "Saint George, forgive the orphaned ...") is made. This stone is also dated to the 13th–14th centuries. Most of the kvajvari stelas that were erected originally on a pedestal were found in modern Kvemo Kartli region of Georgia.

== See also ==
- Davati stele
- Khachkar
- High cross

== Bibliography ==
- Shoshiashvili, Nodar (1980) Corpus of the Georgian Inscriptions, Lapidary Inscriptions, Eastern and Southern Georgia of the V-X centuries, Metsniereba Publishing, Tbilisi
- Cahiers archéologiques (1998) Volumes 46–47, Van Oest Publishing, Contributor: André Grabar
- Machabeli, Kitty (2008) Early medieval Georgian stone crosses, Ministry of Culture and Sports of Georgia, Chubinashvili National Research Centre for History of Georgian Art and Monument Protection, ISBN 978-9941-0-2109-1
