= Tsikha, Ardanuç =

Tsikha (Georgian: ციხა) is an ancient settlement in the historical region of Klarjeti. Today, it is located in the Ardanuç District of Artvin Province in Turkey. Formerly an independent village, Tsikha is now a neighbourhood of the village of Kızılcık.

== History ==
Tsikha or Tsikhe (ციხე), a Georgian place name, means “fortress”. Tsikhia (ციხია), the former name of Yoncalı village in the Şavşat District, is a similar place name. Tsikha appears as ‘Sikha’ (سخی or سیخی) in Ottoman records. However, the Ottoman spelling was also read as ‘Skha’ (სხა).

The Klarjeti region, where the village of Tsikha is located, was one of the areas that formed Georgia in the Middle Ages. Indeed, the Ottomans seized this region from the Georgians in the mid-16th century.

According to the Ottoman land-survey register (mufassal defter) dated 1574, Tsikha village was one of the villages belonging to the Ardanuç district (nahiye) of Ardanuç province (liva) and had a population of 11 Christian households. According to the 1595 Ottoman land-survey register titled Defter-i Mufassal-i Liva-i Ardanuç, the village's population remained Christian but had decreased to 7 households.

The village of Tsikha is recorded as ‘Sikha’ (سخی) in the Ottoman cebe defter covering the period 1694–1732 in the province of Çıldır (Çıldır Eyaleti). In 1137 AH (1705/1706 AD), the village belonged to the Ardanuç subdistrict of the Ardanuç district, and its revenue was 4,999 akçe.

In the 1835 census, in which the Ottoman administration recorded only the male population, 32 males were recorded in 12 households in Tsikha or Sikha village. Adding the same number of females reveals that the total population of the village was approximately 64 people.[8] One household had six Catholic males.

Tsikha village was ceded to Russia by the Ottoman Empire as part of the war reparations under the Treaty of Berlin signed following the 1877–1878 Russo-Turkish War. The Russian administration recorded the village as ‘Skha’ or ‘Tsikha’ (Сха or Циха) in the 1886 census. At that time, this settlement was one of seven villages in the Uniskhevi sub-district, which belonged to the Ardanuç district (uchastok) of the Artvin Okrug. Its population consisted of 25 people living in 8 households, 12 of whom were men and 13 women. The entire village population was recorded as ‘Turk’.

Nikolay Marr, who conducted research trips in the Klarjeti and Shavsheti regions in 1904, mentioned Tsikha as a village but noted its name as ‘Shu’. On his way to New Rabat, he noted that the villages of ‘Skhu’ (Сху) and “Unuskhev” (Унусхевъ) were on the left, then wrote that he passed through the village of ‘Haraul’ (Хараулъ).

After the Russian army withdrew from the region in 1918, the village of Tsikha remained within the borders of Georgia. It was ceded to Turkey under the Treaty of Moscow dated 16 March 1921. The fact that it did not appear as a village in the 1922 census conducted in the Artvin district indicates that Tsikha was attached to the village of Uniskhevi as a neighbourhood. Tsikha or Sikha is still a neighbourhood of the village of Kızılcık today, under the name ‘Sıka’.
