= Örtülü =

Örtülü may refer to:

In Turkey:

- Örtülü, Dazkırı, a village in Dazkırı district of Afyonkarahisar Province
- Örtülü, Hocalar, a village in Hocalar district of Afyonkarahisar Province
- Örtülü, Ardanuç, a village in Ardanuç district of Artvin Province
- Örtülü, Bozdoğan, a village in Bozdoğan district of Aydın Province
- Örtülü, Maden, a village in Maden district of Elazığ Province, see populated places in Elazığ Province
- Örtülü, Kınık, a village in Kınık district of İzmir Province, see populated places in İzmir Province
- Örtülü, Gülnar, a village in Gülnar district of Mersin Province
- Örtülü, Of, a village in Of district of Trabzon Province, see populated places in Trabzon Province
