= Çalkaya =

Çalkaya can refer to:

- Çalkaya, Maden
- Çalkaya, Taşova
