= Kaşlıca =

Kaşlıca can refer to:

- Kaşlıca, Maden
- Kaşlıca, Tut
- Kaşlıca, Yüreğir
