= Yenibahçe =

Yenibahçe can refer to:

- Yenibahçe, Maden
- Yenibahçe, Silifke
