= Harmanlı =

Harmanlı (literally "(place) with the harvest") is a Turkish place name that may refer to the following places in Turkey:

- Harmanlı, Ardanuç, a village in the district of Ardanuç, Artvin Province
- Harmanlı, Arsin, a village in the district of Arsin, Trabzon Province
- Harmanlı, Biga
- Harmanlı, Bismil
- Harmanlı, Gölbaşı, a village in the district of Gölbaşı, Adıyaman Province
- Harmanlı, Karacabey, a village in the district of Karacabey, Bursa Province
- Harmanlı, Yeşilova, a village in the district of Yeşilova, Burdur Province

== See also ==
- Harmanli
