= Yolağzı =

Yolağzı (literally "mouth of the road" in Turkish) may refer to the following places in Turkey:

- Yolağzı, Ardanuç, a village in Artvin Province
- Yolağzı, Batman, a village in Batman Province
- Yolağzı, Bitlis, a village in Bitlis Province
- Yolağzı, Eceabat, a village in Çanakkale Province
- Yolağzı, Gercüş, a village in Batman Province
- Yolağzı, Karacabey, a neighbourhood in Bursa Province
- Yolağzı, Karkamış or Çokşuruk, a neighbourhood in Gaziantep Province
- Yolağzı, Posof, a village in Ardahan Province
- Yolağzı, Silopi, a village in Şırnak Province
