= Aşıklar =

Aşıklar can refer to:

- Aşıklar, Ardanuç
- Aşıklar, Ilgaz
