= Kaşıkçı =

Kaşıkçı can refer to the following villages in Turkey:

- Kaşıkçı Ardanuç
- Kaşıkçı, Balya
- Kaşıkcı, Buldan
