= Işıktepe =

Işıktepe can refer to:

- Işıktepe, Maden
- Işıktepe, Toroslar
