= Arnauli =

Arnauli (Georgian: არნაული) is a settlement in the Klarjeti region. Today, it is a part of Bulanık village, Ardanuç District, Artvin Province in Turkey.

== History ==
The Georgian toponym Arnauli (არნაული) may derive from a family name. Indeed, there are Georgian family names ending with the suffix "-uli" (-ული). Other Georgian toponyms in the village, such as Dudumeti (დუდუმეთი), Chanchakhi (ჭანჭახი), and Karsevani (ყარსევანი), have survived to this day. The name Arnauli was recorded in Turkish as Arnavul (آرناوول) and later changed to Kirazlı.

Arnauli was located in Klarjeti, one of the regions that formed historical Georgia. Indeed, the Ottomans captured this region from the Georgians in the 16th century. Karsevani Castle may also date from this period.

According to the Ottoman cebe defter of Çıldır Province (Çıldır Eyaleti), covering the period 1694-1732, the village of Arnauli was part of the Ardanuç district (nahiye) of the Ardanuç liva. In 1136 AH (1723/1724), the village's revenue was 6,000 akçe, and it was given to a man named Mahmud.

The village of Arnauli was ceded to Russia by the Ottoman Empire as part of war reparations following the 1877–1878 Russo-Turkish War. The settlement, recorded as Arnaul (Арнаулъ) by the Russian administration in the 1886 census, was a neighborhood of Longethevi, part of the Longothevi sub-district of the Ardanuç district of the Artvin Sanjak. Longothevi had 413 people living in 57 households. Nine of these 57 households were located in the Arnauli neighborhood. Based on the average number of people per household in the village, it can be said that Arnauli's population consisted of approximately 65 people.

After the Artvin region was ceded to Türkiye, Arnauli was not listed as a village in the 1922 population survey conducted in the Artvin district. This settlement was listed as a separate village in a 1927 book by Muvahhid Zeki, known for his work on the Artvin province. According to the 1926 population survey, the village's population consisted of 60 people, 31 male and 29 female, living in 11 households.

Non-Turkish village names in Artvin province were changed in 1925, but the name Arnavul remained. Indeed, in the 1928 Ottoman village list, it appears as Arnavul (ارناوول). At that time, the village was part of the Ardanuç sub-district of the central district of Artvin province. The fact that Arnavul village was not mentioned in the 1935 census suggests that it was a neighborhood within the village of Bulanık before that date. Its name was later changed to Kirazlı, and today it remains a neighborhood within the village of Bulanık.

Karsevani Castle, built in the Middle Ages in Arnauli or Kirazlı, has been completely destroyed, leaving only its cisterns.
