= Hisarlı =

Hisarlı can refer to:

- Hisarlı, Ardanuç
- Hisarlı, Biga
- Hisarlı, Enez
