= Güleş, Ardanuç =

Güleş
- Village
- Location within Turkey
- Coordinates: 41°03′N 42°12′E
- Country: Turkey
- Province: Artvin
- District: Ardanuç
- Population (2021): 424
- Time zone: UTC+3 (TRT)

Güleş is a village in the Ardanuç District, Artvin Province, Turkey. Its population is 424 (2021).
