= Topaluşağı, Maden =

Village in Turkey

Topaluşağı
- Village
- Location in Turkey
- Coordinates: 38°22′34″N 39°31′32″E
- Country: Turkey
- Province: Elazığ
- District: Maden
- Population (2021): 45
- Time zone: UTC+3 (TRT)

Topaluşağı is a village in the Maden District of Elazığ Province in Turkey. Its population is 45 (2021).
