= Peynirli, Ardanuç =

Peynirli
- Village
- Location within Turkey
- Coordinates: 41.0290°N 42.0490°E
- Country: Turkey
- Province: Artvin
- District: Ardanuç
- Population (2021): 237
- Time zone: UTC+3 (TRT)

Peynirli is a village in the Ardanuç District, Artvin Province, Turkey. Its population is 237 (2021).
