= Karlı, Ardanuç =

Karlı
- Village
- Location within Turkey
- Coordinates: 41.0891°N 42.1180°E
- Country: Turkey
- Province: Artvin
- District: Ardanuç
- Population (2021): 70
- Time zone: UTC+3 (TRT)

Karlı is a village in the Ardanuç District, Artvin Province, Turkey. Its population is 70 (2021).
