= Hatunköy, Maden =

Village in Turkey

Hatunköy
- Village
- Location in Turkey
- Coordinates: 38°28′28″N 39°29′0″E
- Country: Turkey
- Province: Elazığ
- District: Maden
- Population (2021): 121
- Time zone: UTC+3 (TRT)

Hatunköy is a village in the Maden District of Elazığ Province in Turkey. Its population is 121 (2021).
