= Akarsu, Ardanuç =

Akarsu
- Village
- Location within Turkey
- Coordinates: 41.1076°N 42.1294°E
- Country: Turkey
- Province: Artvin
- District: Ardanuç
- Population (2021): 106
- Time zone: UTC+3 (TRT)

Akarsu (Georgian: ახარშია, romanized: akharshia) is a village in the Ardanuç District, Artvin Province, Turkey. Its population is 106 (2021).
