= Cevizlik, Ardanuç =

Cevizlik
- Village
- Location within Turkey
- Coordinates: 41°11′45″N 42°7′53″E
- Country: Turkey
- Province: Artvin
- District: Ardanuç
- Population (2021): 80
- Time zone: UTC+3 (TRT)

Cevizlik is a village in the Ardanuç District, Artvin Province, Turkey. Its population is 80 (2021).
