= Ferhatlı, Ardanuç =

Ferhatlı
- Village
- Location within Turkey
- Coordinates: 41°08′21″N 42°00′32″E
- Country: Turkey
- Province: Artvin
- District: Ardanuç
- Population (2021): 78
- Time zone: UTC+3 (TRT)

Ferhatlı is a village in the Ardanuç District, Artvin Province, Turkey. Its population is 78 (2021).

The castle at Ferhatlı is located on a strategic outcrop about 8 kilometers northwest of Ardanuç and 2 kilometers north of Ferhatlı Köy, a site identified with the medieval Akhiz. This Georgian fortress was rebuilt in the 5th century A.D. by King Vakhtang I Gorgasal. The primary circuit walls at the north are carefully integrated into the rock cliff. Extensive damage has eliminated most traces of internal structures. Ardanuç Kalesi, another impressive fortress, was in the medieval district of Klarjet’i. It has the remains of a Georgian church and massive circuit walls at the southwest. In the 16th century its Georgian rulers converted to Islam. By the 19th century the area had a sizable Armenian population. In 1983 both Ferhatlı Kalesi and Ardanuç Kalesi were surveyed and three years later an accurate scaled plan and description were published
