= Gezin =

- Village
- Location within Turkey
- Coordinates: 38°31′N 39°31′E
- Country: Turkey
- Province: Elazığ
- District: Maden
- Elevation: 1,260 m (4,130 ft)
- Population (2021): 1,075
- Time zone: UTC+3 (TRT)
- Postal code: 23460
- Area code: 0424

Gezin is a village in Maden District of Elazığ Province, Turkey. It is on Turkish state highway D885 on the east shore of Lake Hazar, 25 kilometres (16 mi) from Maden and 55 kilometres (34 mi) from Elazığ. Its population is 1,075 (2021). Formerly Gezin was situated several kilometers east of its present location, but was moved to its present place by the lake. Gezin was a town (belde) between 1992 and the 2013 reorganisation.
