= Sağrılı, Maden =

Village in Turkey

Sağrılı
- Village
- Location in Turkey
- Coordinates: 38°23′N 39°47′E
- Country: Turkey
- Province: Elazığ
- District: Maden
- Population (2021): 153
- Time zone: UTC+3 (TRT)

Sağrılı is a village in the Maden District of Elazığ Province in Turkey. Its population is 153 (2021).
