= Gökçe, Ardanuç =

Gökçe
- Village
- Location within Turkey
- Coordinates: 41.1935°N 42.0358°E
- Country: Turkey
- Province: Artvin
- District: Ardanuç
- Population (2021): 45
- Time zone: UTC+3 (TRT)

Gökçe is a village in the Ardanuç District, Artvin Province, Turkey. Its population is 45 (2021).
