= Arslantaşı, Maden =

Village in Turkey

Arslantaşı
- Village
- Location in Turkey
- Coordinates: 38°26′N 39°43′E
- Country: Turkey
- Province: Elazığ
- District: Maden
- Population (2021): 59
- Time zone: UTC+3 (TRT)

Arslantaşı is a village in the Maden District of Elazığ Province in Turkey. Its population is 59 (2021).
