= Aşağıırmaklar, Ardanuç =

Aşağıırmaklar
- Village
- Location within Turkey
- Coordinates: 41°11′04″N 42°10′38″E
- Country: Turkey
- Province: Artvin
- District: Ardanuç
- Population (2021): 148
- Time zone: UTC+3 (TRT)

Aşağıırmaklar is a village in the Ardanuç District, Artvin Province, Turkey. Its population is 148 (2021).
