= Konaklı, Ardanuç =

Konaklı
- Village
- Location within Turkey
- Coordinates: 41.1219°N 42.1531°E
- Country: Turkey
- Province: Artvin
- District: Ardanuç
- Population (2021): 88
- Time zone: UTC+3 (TRT)

Konaklı is a village in the Ardanuç District, Artvin Province, Turkey. Its population is 88 (2021).
