= Anaçlı, Ardanuç =

Anaçlı
- Village
- Location within Turkey
- Coordinates: 41°12′N 42°05′E
- Country: Turkey
- Province: Artvin
- District: Ardanuç
- Population (2021): 96
- Time zone: UTC+3 (TRT)

Anaçlı is a village in the Ardanuç District, Artvin Province, Turkey. Its population is 96 (2021).
