= Avcılar, Ardanuç =

Avcılar
- Village
- Location within Turkey
- Coordinates: 41.1273°N 41.9749°E
- Country: Turkey
- Province: Artvin
- District: Ardanuç
- Population (2021): 82
- Time zone: UTC+3 (TRT)

Avcılar is a village in the Ardanuç District, Artvin Province, Turkey. Its population is 82 (2021).
