= Koçkonağı, Maden =

Village in Turkey

Koçkonağı
- Village
- Location in Turkey
- Coordinates: 38°20′N 39°27′E
- Country: Turkey
- Province: Elazığ
- District: Maden
- Population (2021): 43
- Time zone: UTC+3 (TRT)

Koçkonağı is a village in the Maden District of Elazığ Province in Turkey. Its population is 43 (2021).
