= Yukarıırmaklar, Ardanuç =

Yukarıırmaklar
- Village
- Location within Turkey
- Coordinates: 41.183°N 42.194°E
- Country: Turkey
- Province: Artvin
- District: Ardanuç
- Population (2021): 65
- Time zone: UTC+3 (TRT)

Yukarıırmaklar is a village in the Ardanuç District, Artvin Province, Turkey. Its population is 65 (2021).
