= Dutpınar, Maden =

Village in Turkey

Dutpınar
- Village
- Location in Turkey
- Coordinates: 38°24′39″N 39°36′19″E
- Country: Turkey
- Province: Elazığ
- District: Maden
- Population (2021): 73
- Time zone: UTC+3 (TRT)

Dutpınar is a village in the Maden District of Elazığ Province in Turkey. Its population is 73 (2021).
