= Kavak, Maden =

Village in Turkey

Kavak
- Village
- Location in Turkey
- Coordinates: 38°23′39″N 39°25′27″E
- Country: Turkey
- Province: Elazığ
- District: Maden
- Population (2021): 329
- Time zone: UTC+3 (TRT)

Kavak is a village in the Maden District of Elazığ Province in Turkey. Its population is 329 (2021).
