= Akboğa, Maden =

Village in Turkey

Akboğa
- Village
- Location in Turkey
- Coordinates: 38°26′N 39°33′E
- Country: Turkey
- Province: Elazığ
- District: Maden
- Population (2021): 69
- Time zone: UTC+3 (TRT)

Akboğa is a village in the Maden District of Elazığ Province in Turkey. Its population is 69 (2021).
