= Boyalı, Ardanuç =

Boyalı
- Village
- Location within Turkey
- Coordinates: 41.1185°N 42.1121°E
- Country: Turkey
- Province: Artvin
- District: Ardanuç
- Population (2021): 136
- Time zone: UTC+3 (TRT)

Boyalı is a village in the Ardanuç District, Artvin Province, Turkey. Its population is 136 (2021).
