= Bulanık, Ardanuç =

Bulanık
- Village
- Location within Turkey
- Coordinates: 41°03′40″N 42°10′35″E
- Country: Turkey
- Province: Artvin
- District: Ardanuç
- Population (2021): 336
- Time zone: UTC+3 (TRT)

Bulanık is a village in the Ardanuç District, Artvin Province, Turkey. Its population is 336 (2021).

The Georgian village of Arnauli was within the present-day borders of Bulanık village.
