= Stele of Davati =

5th-century Georgian stele

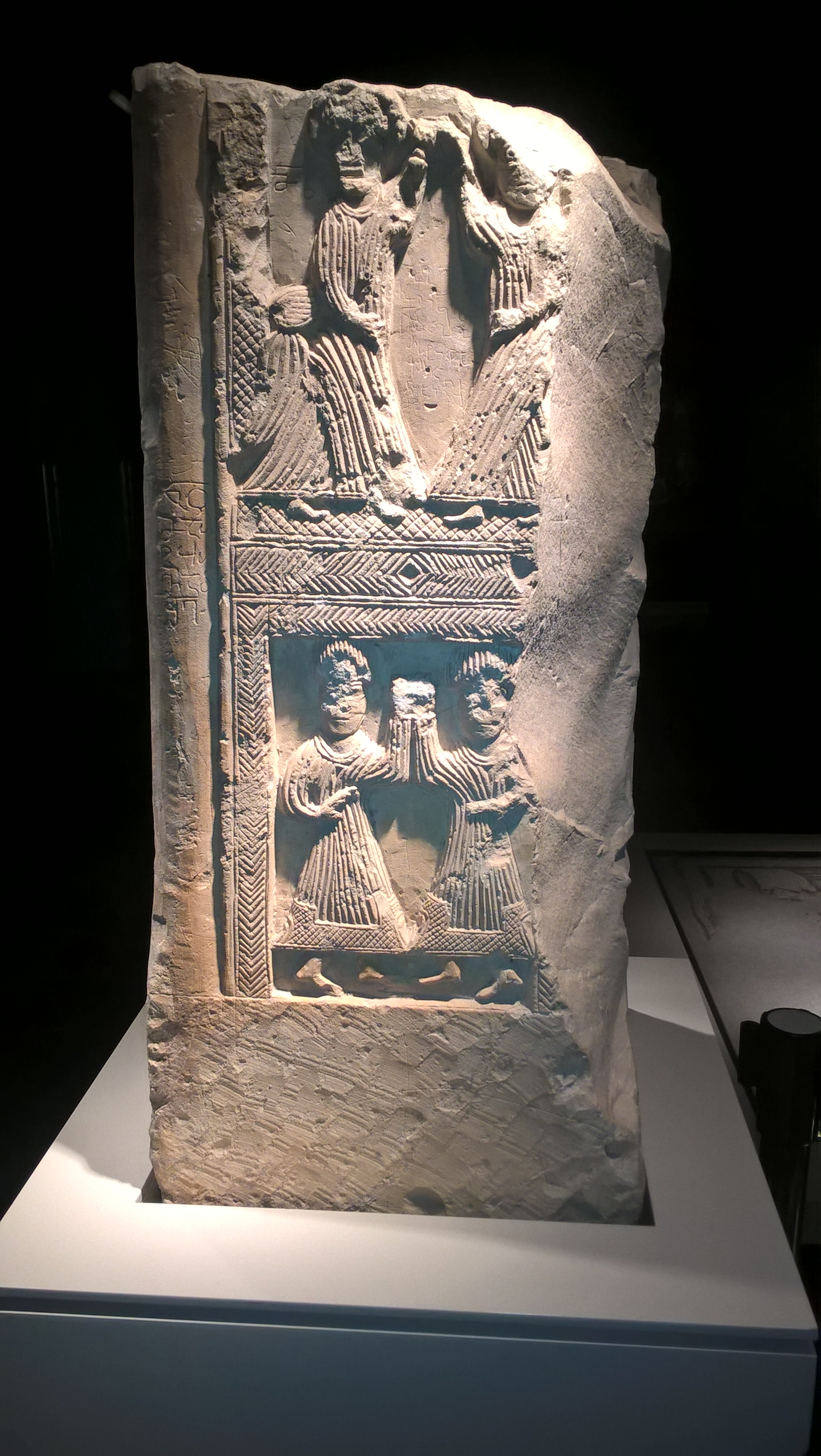
- Material: Relief
- Size: Height 61cm
- Writing: Georgian script
- Created: 6th century
- Discovered: 1985
- Present location: Simon Janashia Museum of Georgia, Tbilisi
- Language: Old Georgian

The stele of Davati (Georgian: დავათის სტელა, romanized: davatis st'ela) is a kvajvari, cross-shaped limestone stele, carrying a bas-relief, depicting Virgin Mary alongside the archangels Michael and Gabriel, with one of the earliest inscriptions in Georgian Asomtavruli script. Two other men depicted in the bas-relief could not yet be identified; maybe they are the sponsors of the stele. The upper part of the stele that is assumed to have been depiction of the Feast of the Ascension is broken and lost. It has been dated to the 6th century. The stele was discovered in 1985 in a small Church of the Virgin in highland village of Davati, Dusheti Municipality.

== Hypothesis ==
The Georgian scholar Ramin Ramishvili conjectures that the combination of letters ႩႲႽ corresponds to the number 5320 (5000 + 300 + 20, correspondingly Ⴉ [k] + Ⴒ [t] + Ⴝ [č]), which may denote, according to Georgian numerals, the year 284 BC, the alleged date of creation of the first Georgian script.

== See also ==
- Stele of Serapeitis
- Stele of Vespasian

== Bibliography ==
- Machabeli, K. (2008) Early Medieval Georgian Stone Crosses, Ministry of Culture and Sports of Georgia, Chubinashvili National Research Centre for History of Georgian Art and Monument Protection, ISBN 978-9941-0-2109-1
