= Kızıltepe, Maden =

Village in Turkey

Kızıltepe
- Village
- Location in Turkey
- Coordinates: 38°28′54″N 39°31′12″E
- Country: Turkey
- Province: Elazığ
- District: Maden
- Population (2021): 200
- Time zone: UTC+3 (TRT)

Kızıltepe is a village in the Maden District of Elazığ Province in Turkey. Its population is 200 (2021).
