= Tepedüzü, Ardanuç =

Tepedüzü
- Village
- Location within Turkey
- Coordinates: 41.0859°N 42.0746°E
- Country: Turkey
- Province: Artvin
- District: Ardanuç
- Population (2021): 189
- Time zone: UTC+3 (TRT)

Tepedüzü is a village in the Ardanuç District, Artvin Province, Turkey. Its population is 189 (2021).
