= Ustalar, Ardanuç =

Ustalar
- Village
- Location within Turkey
- Coordinates: 41.1653°N 42.1377°E
- Country: Turkey
- Province: Artvin
- District: Ardanuç
- Population (2021): 30
- Time zone: UTC+3 (TRT)

Ustalar is a village in the Ardanuç District, Artvin Province, Turkey. Its population is 30 (2021).
