= Beratlı, Ardanuç =

Beratlı
- Village
- Location within Turkey
- Coordinates: 41°09′N 42°08′E
- Country: Turkey
- Province: Artvin
- District: Ardanuç
- Population (2021): 57
- Time zone: UTC+3 (TRT)

Beratlı is a village in the Ardanuç District, Artvin Province, Turkey. Its population is 57 (2021).
