= Tosunlu, Ardanuç =

Tosunlu
- Village
- Location within Turkey
- Coordinates: 41°02′56″N 42°09′43″E
- Country: Turkey
- Province: Artvin
- District: Ardanuç
- Population (2021): 144
- Time zone: UTC+3 (TRT)

Tosunlu is a village in the Ardanuç District, Artvin Province, Turkey. Its population is 144 (2021).
