= Tetritsqaro =

Tetritskaro თეთრიწყარო
- Town
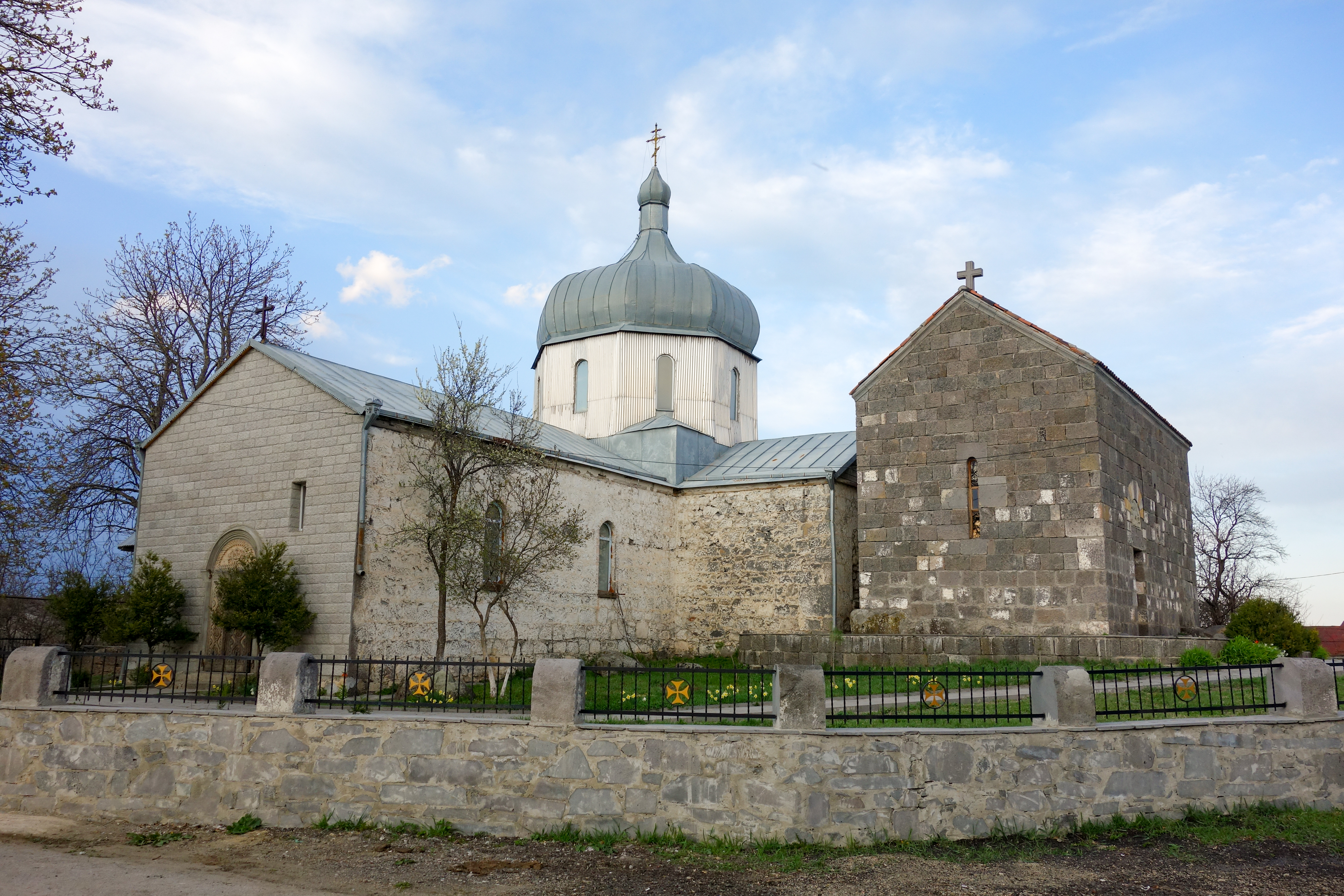
- St. Nicholas Church of Tetri Tskaro (XIX c.)
- Interactive map of Tetritskaro
- Location within Georgia Location within Kvemo Kartli
- Coordinates: 41°33′0″N 44°28′0″E
- Country: Georgia
- Region: Kvemo Kartli
- District: Tetritsqaro
- Elevation: 1,180 m (3,870 ft)

Population (2024)
  - Total: 4,762
- Time zone: UTC+4 (Georgian Time)

Tetritskaro or Tetritsqaro (Georgian: თეთრიწყარო, romanized: tetrits'q'aro; Georgian pronunciation: [ˈtʰetʰɾitsʼqʼaɾo], Azerbaijani: Ağbulaq) is a town in Kvemo Kartli in southern Georgia. It is the municipal center of Tetritsqaro Municipality. According to 2014 Georgian Census its population is 3,093. The Baku-Tbilisi-Kars railway which opened in 2017, runs along the rail line through the town.

== Geography ==
The town of Tetrisqaro is located on the southern side of the Trialeti region, 59 km southwest from the capital Tbilisi. The highway from Tbilisi to Akhalkalaki, near the Georgia–Turkey border, passes through the town.

== History ==
Original settlement on this location was called Garisi (გარისი), but due to invasions and wars this place got abandoned and in the beginning of the 19th century became a ghost town. Later, this area was resettled by Georgian Azerbaijanis, who called the settlement Agbulakhi; the name was of Azerbaijani origin and literally meant white spring. In 1940, the name was changed to Tetri-Tskaro, which, in Georgian, also means white spring. Town status was granted to it in 1966.

In the town is the village of Asureti, founded and formerly inhabited by Caucasus Germans. Tetritsqaro also housed major Soviet military barracks, which was abandoned before the Russo-Georgian War.

== Gallery ==
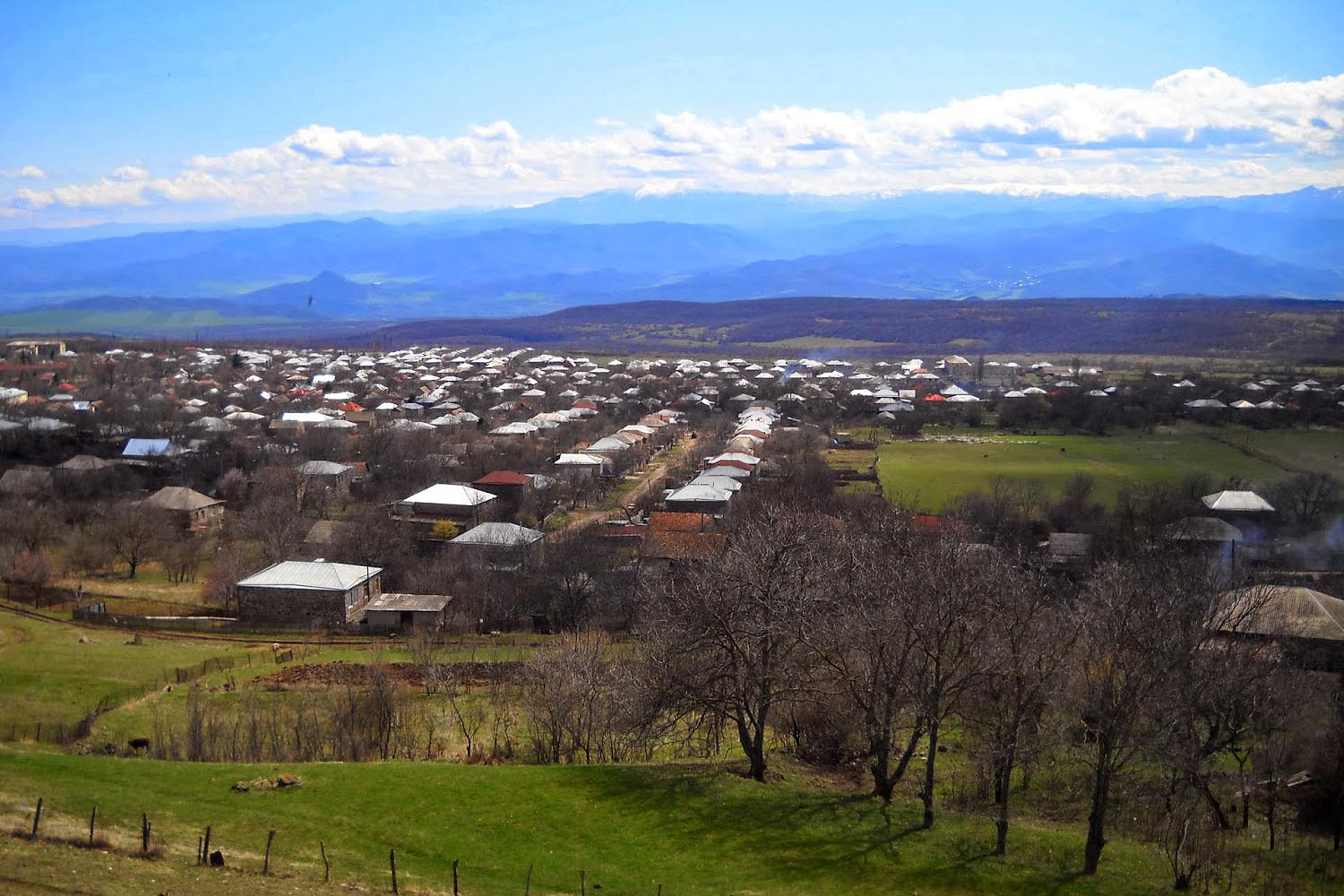
View of the town

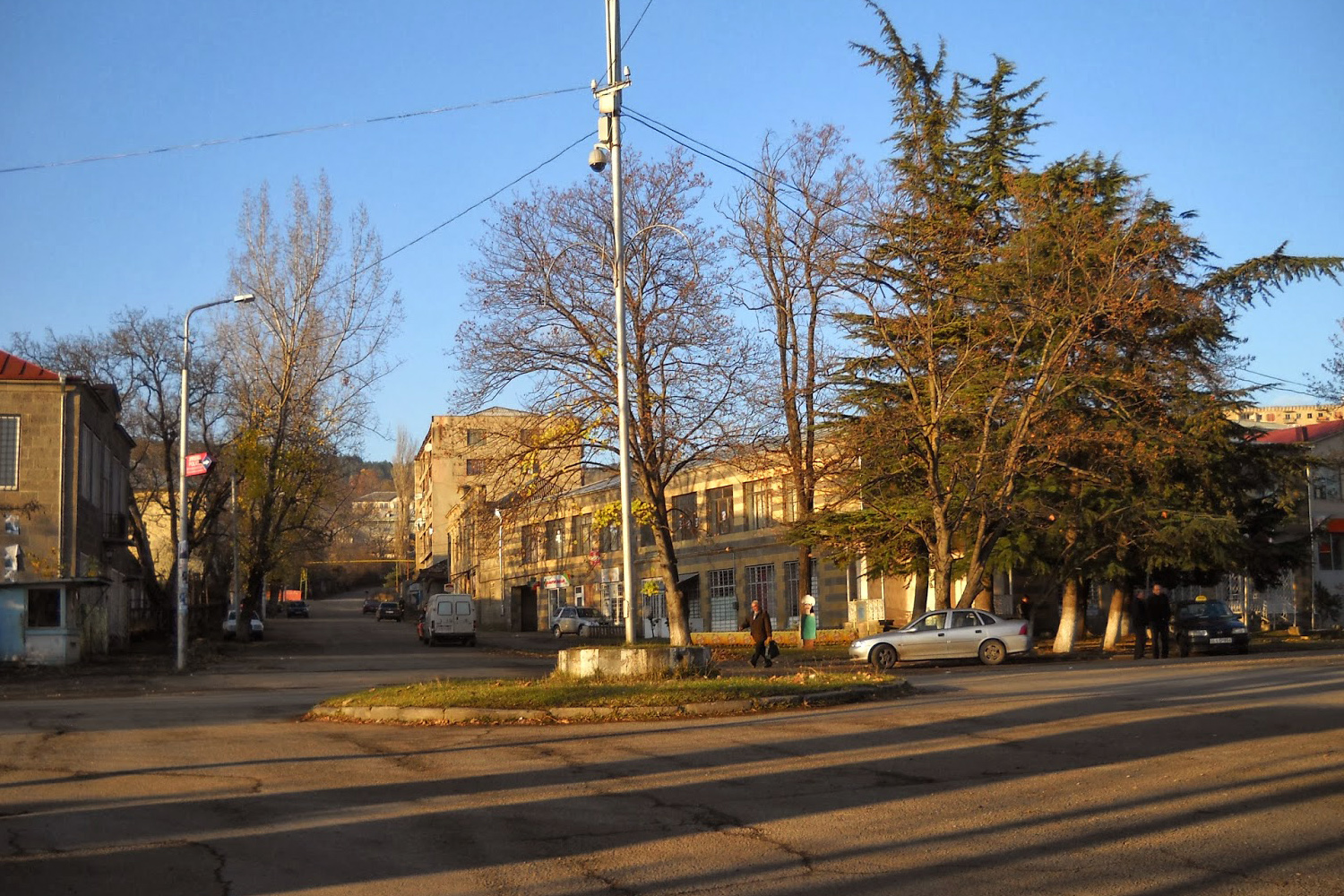
Center of the town

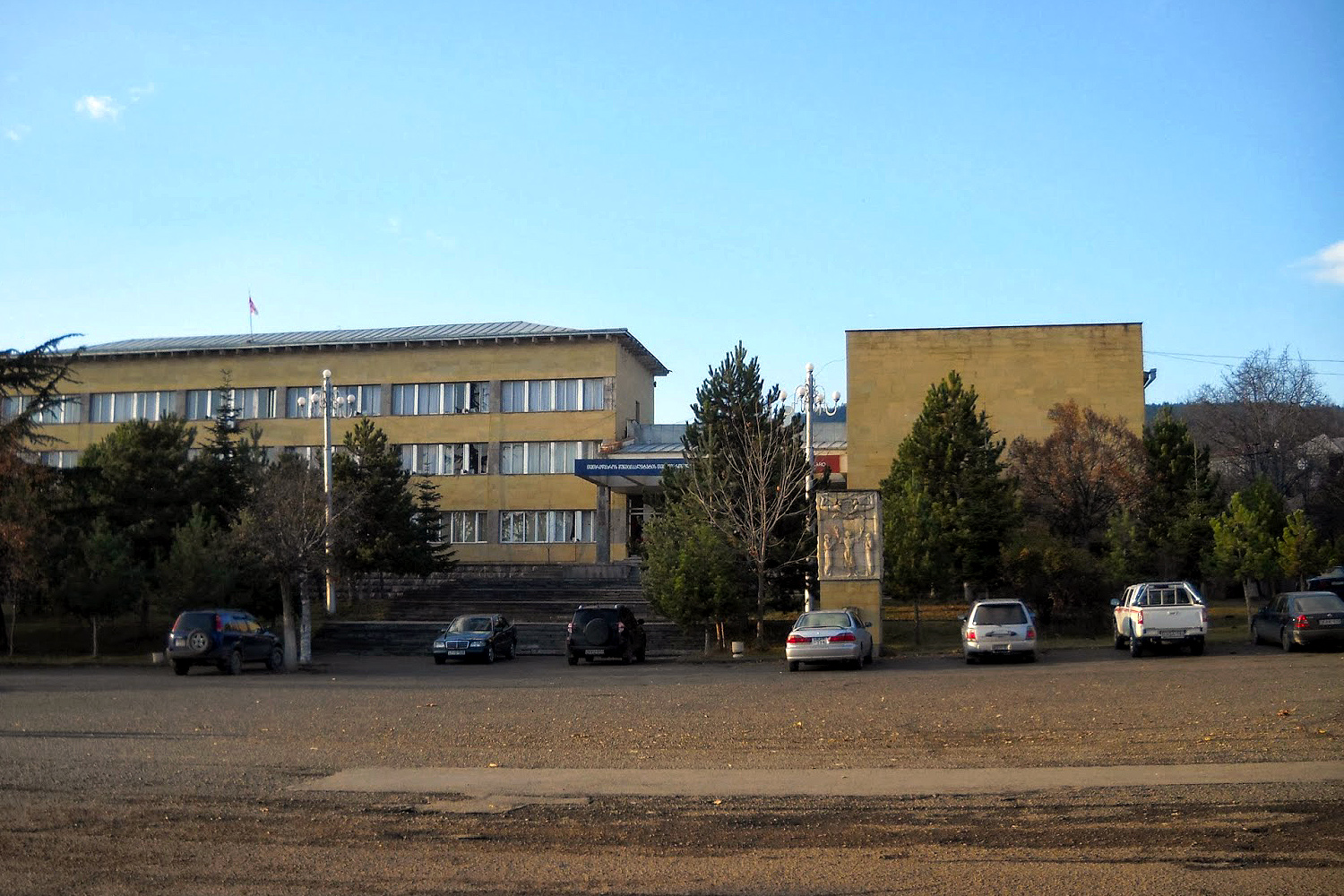
Tetrisqaro Municipal Center

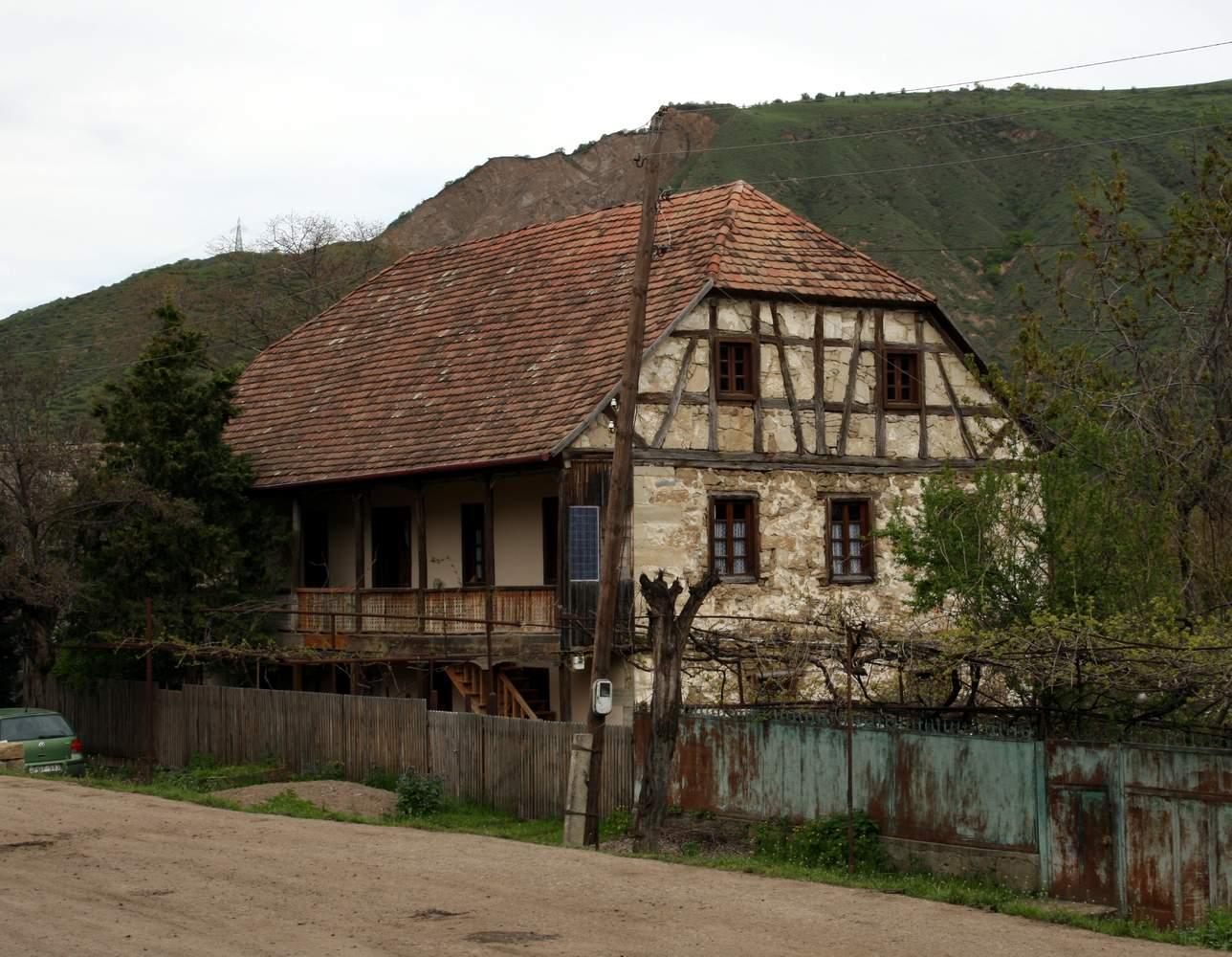
German Lutheran house in Asureti

== See also ==
- Gudarekhi
- Kvemo Kartli
