= Tekevler, Maden =

Village in Turkey

Tekevler
- Village
- Location in Turkey
- Coordinates: 38°29′21″N 39°35′52″E
- Country: Turkey
- Province: Elazığ
- District: Maden
- Population (2021): 257
- Time zone: UTC+3 (TRT)

Tekevler is a village in the Maden District of Elazığ Province in Turkey. Its population is 257 (2021).
