= Karatop, Maden =

Village in Turkey

Karatop
- Village
- Location in Turkey
- Coordinates: 38°25′32″N 39°40′46″E
- Country: Turkey
- Province: Elazığ
- District: Maden
- Population (2021): 71
- Time zone: UTC+3 (TRT)

Karatop is a village in the Maden District of Elazığ Province in Turkey. Its population is 71 (2021).
