= Bereket, Ardanuç =

Bereket
- Village
- Location within Turkey
- Coordinates: 41.0742°N 41.9792°E
- Country: Turkey
- Province: Artvin
- District: Ardanuç
- Population (2021): 143
- Time zone: UTC+3 (TRT)

Bereket is a village in the Ardanuç District, Artvin Province, Turkey. Its population is 143 (2021).

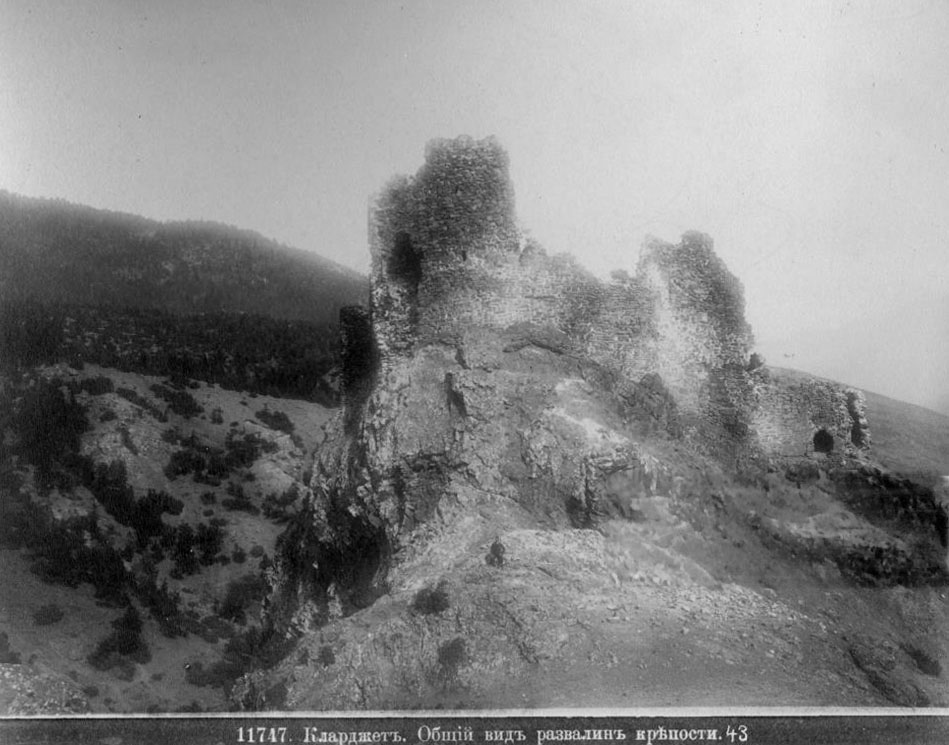
Klarjeti Castle by Dmitri Yermakov

The historical name of Bereket is Klarjeti. The village bears the same name as the historical region in which it is located. The most important historical structure in the village is Klarjeti Castle.
