= Yaylacık, Ardanuç =

Yaylacık
- Village
- Location within Turkey
- Coordinates: 41°09′31″N 42°12′28″E
- Country: Turkey
- Province: Artvin
- District: Ardanuç
- Population (2021): 44
- Time zone: UTC+3 (TRT)

Yaylacık is a village in the Ardanuç District, Artvin Province, Turkey. Its population is 44 (2021).
