= Çakıroğlu, Maden =

Village in Turkey

Çakıroğlu
- Village
- Location in Turkey
- Coordinates: 38.3325°N 39.3573°E
- Country: Turkey
- Province: Elazığ
- District: Maden
- Population (2021): 173
- Time zone: UTC+3 (TRT)

Çakıroğlu is a village in the Maden District of Elazığ Province in Turkey. Its population is 173 (2021).
