= Ağadibek, Maden =

Village in Turkey

Ağadibek
- Village
- Location within Turkey
- Coordinates: 38°21′N 39°40′E
- Country: Turkey
- Province: Elazığ
- District: Maden
- Population (2021): 111
- Time zone: UTC+3 (TRT)

Ağadibek is a village in the Maden District of Elazığ Province in Turkey. Its population is 111 (2021).
