= Hanevleri, Maden =

Village in Turkey

Hanevleri
- Village
- Location in Turkey
- Coordinates: 38°25′N 39°34′E
- Country: Turkey
- Province: Elazığ
- District: Maden
- Population (2021): 125
- Time zone: UTC+3 (TRT)

Hanevleri is a village in the Maden District of Elazığ Province in Turkey. Its population is 125 (2021).
