= Yıldızhan, Maden =

Village in Turkey

Yıldızhan
- Village
- Location in Turkey
- Coordinates: 38°22′N 39°24′E
- Country: Turkey
- Province: Elazığ
- District: Maden
- Population (2021): 73
- Time zone: UTC+3 (TRT)

Yıldızhan is a village in the Maden District of Elazığ Province in Turkey. Its population is 73 (2021).
