= Kapıköy, Ardanuç =

Kapıköy
- Village
- Location within Turkey
- Coordinates: 41.1781°N 42.2301°E
- Country: Turkey
- Province: Artvin
- District: Ardanuç
- Population (2026): 650
- Time zone: UTC+3 (TRT)

Kapıköy is a village in the Ardanuç District, Artvin Province, Turkey. Its population is about 650 (2021).
