= Hamurlu, Ardanuç =

Hamurlu
- Village
- Location within Turkey
- Coordinates: 41°8′16″N 42°8′12″E
- Country: Turkey
- Province: Artvin
- District: Ardanuç
- Population (2021): 86
- Time zone: UTC+3 (TRT)

Hamurlu is a village in the Ardanuç District, Artvin Province, Turkey. Its population is 86 (2021).
