= Sakarya, Ardanuç =

Sakarya
- Village
- Location within Turkey
- Coordinates: 41.0959°N 42.0179°E
- Country: Turkey
- Province: Artvin
- District: Ardanuç
- Population (2021): 170
- Time zone: UTC+3 (TRT)

Sakarya is a village in the Ardanuç District, Artvin Province, Turkey. Its population is 170 (2021).
