= Maden, Elazığ =

Maden
- Municipality
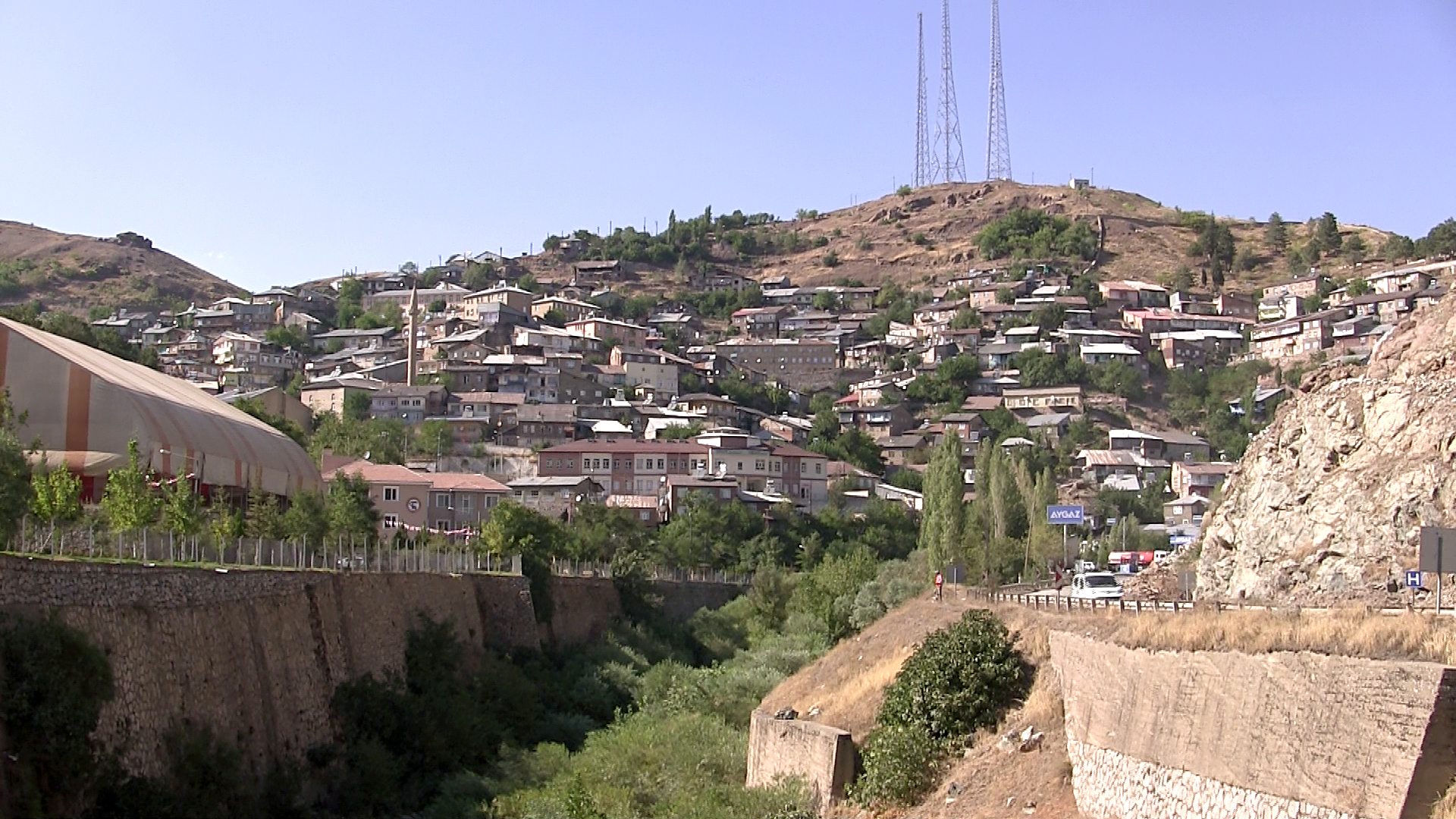

- Location within Turkey
- Coordinates: 38°23′23″N 39°40′07″E
- Country: Turkey
- Province: Elazığ
- District: Maden

Government
  - Mayor: Orhan Yavuz (MHP)
- Elevation: 1,054 m (3,458 ft)
- Population (2021): 3,662
- Time zone: UTC+3 (TRT)
- Postal code: 23400
- Climate: Csa
- Website: www.maden.bel.tr

Maden (Armenian: Արղանա-Մադեն, romanized: Arghana-Maden) is a town (belde) in Elazığ Province of Turkey. It is the seat of Maden District. Its population is 3,662 (2021). The mayor is Orhan Yavuz Nationalist Movement Party (MHP).

== History ==
According to the Armenian Patriarchate of Constantinople, there were 10,559 Armenians in the kaza of Maden on the eve of the First World War, maintaining ten churches, two monasteries and seven schools. They were all massacred in July 1915, with many of them thrown into a crevasse in Çüngüş called Yudan Dere (Armenian: Dudan).

There were also some 500 Greek families living in Maden on the eve of the war.

== Demographics ==
Mother tongue, Maden District, 1927 Turkish census
Turkish	Arabic	Kurdish	Circassian	Armenian	Unknown or other language
2,452	1	7,544	–	5	17

Religion, Maden District, 1927 Turkish census
Muslim	Christian	Jewish	Unknown or other religion
9,999	19	–	1

== Notable people ==
- Nûredin Zaza, politician
- Fatih Kısaparmak, musician
