= Ovacık, Ardanuç =

Ovacık
- Village
- Location within Turkey
- Coordinates: 41.0539°N 41.9888°E
- Country: Turkey
- Province: Artvin
- District: Ardanuç
- Population (2021): 134
- Time zone: UTC+3 (TRT)

Ovacık is a village in the Ardanuç District, Artvin Province, Turkey. Its population is 134 (2021).
