= Gudarekhi monastery =

Georgian Orthodox monastery in Georgia

- გუდარეხის მონასტერი
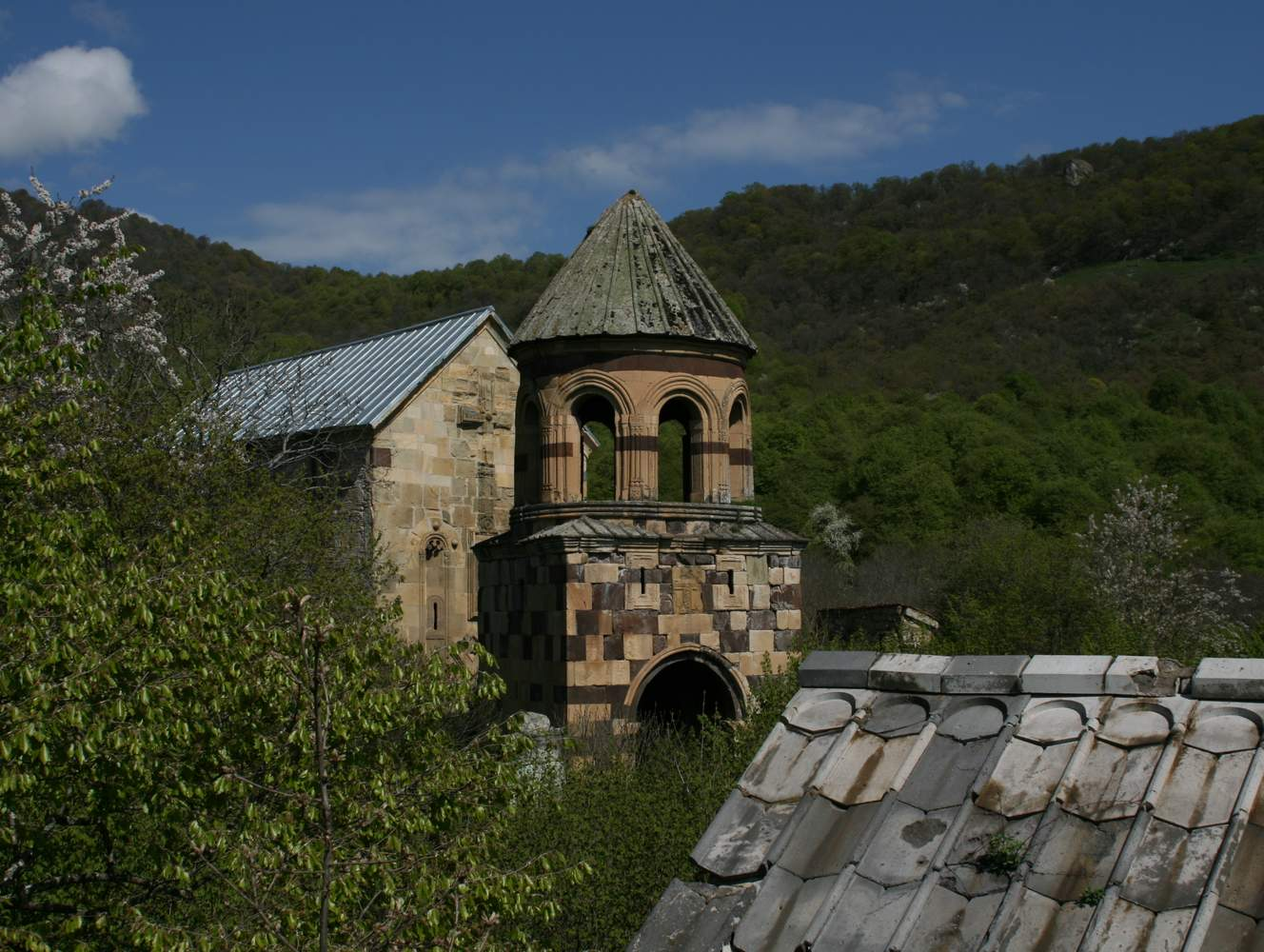
- Gudarekhi monastery complex
- Location: Tetritsqaro Municipality, Kvemo Kartli, Georgia
- Coordinates: 41.591389°N 44.428611°E
- Type: Monastery complex

The Gudarekhi monastery (Georgian: გუდარეხის მონასტერი, romanized: gudarekhis monast'eri) is a 13th-century Georgian Orthodox monastery in the south of Georgia. It is located west of the village of Gudarekhi, Tetritsqaro Municipality, in the Kvemo Kartli region. The monastery complex consists of the main hall church, a free-standing bell-tower, and ruins of various structures such as a palace, cells, chapels, wine-cellar, and stables. The church is adorned with medieval stone-carvings and inscriptions. The complex is inscribed on the list of Immovable Cultural Monuments of National Significance.

== History ==
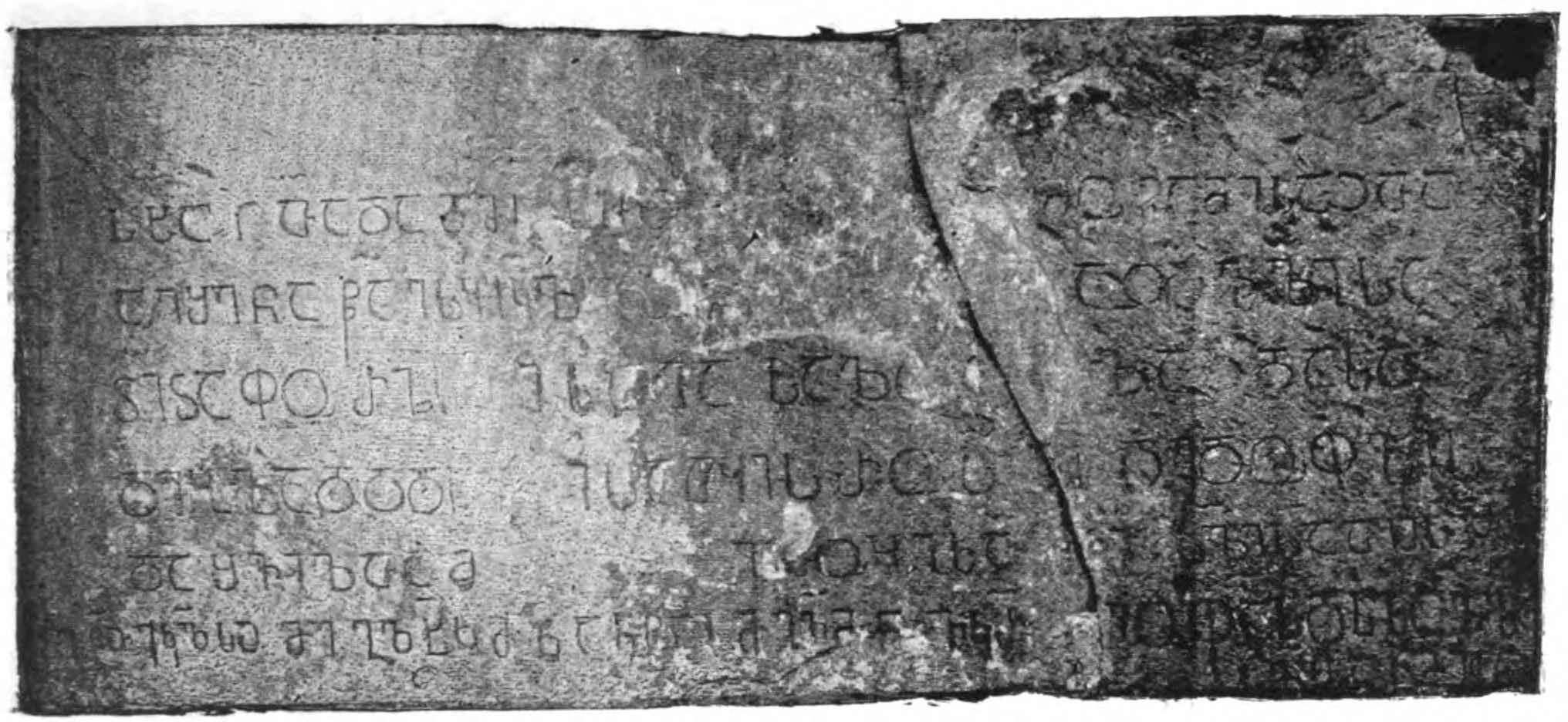
A wall inscription on the southern facade. Published by E. Taqaishvili, 1904.

The Gudarekhi monastery was built in the 13th century, apparently on the site of an earlier church structure. North of it are the ruins of a medieval settlement, where archaeological digs revealed fragments of locally produced pottery and medieval coins, 18 Georgian and one Mongol. The more exact dating of the extant church depends on the interpretation of a commemorative inscription on the southern wall, which mentions "Queen of Queens Rusudan". Earlier historians such as Dimitri Bakradze and Marie-Félicité Brosset saw in this queen Rusudan, daughter of Demetrius I of Georgia (died c. 1210), but Ekvtime Taqaishvili's identification with Rusudan of Georgia (reigned 1223–1245) gained more traction. More recently, Gurand Mchedlidze illustrated that this Rusudan could have been a daughter of King Demetrius II of Georgia and the construction of the church could have been started no earlier than 1282.

The Gudarekhi monastery continued to function under royal patronage. King Simon I, in a charter of 1 January 1586, donated the monastery to the cathedral of Dmanisi. On 24 August 1643, King Rostom, himself a Muslim, granted the monastery to the princely family of Germanozishvili, a branch of the great house of Baratashvili. The monastery owned estates and serfs in nearby villages and served as a familial abbey and burial ground for the Germanozishvili. By 1756, both the princely family and the monastery had gone in significant decline; constant warfare and political instability depopulated the Gudarekhi area and the wider Kvemo Kartli region. The village was deserted, the monastery was abandoned and its environs were reclaimed by nature until being rediscovered by the 19th-century students of Georgian antiquities. The church was repaired through a government-funded program in 2006.

== Architecture ==
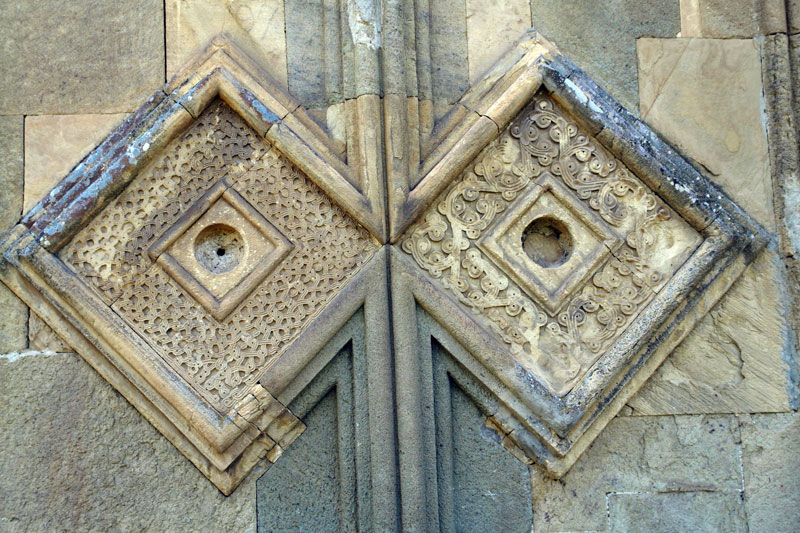
Stone carvings on the eastern facade of the main church.

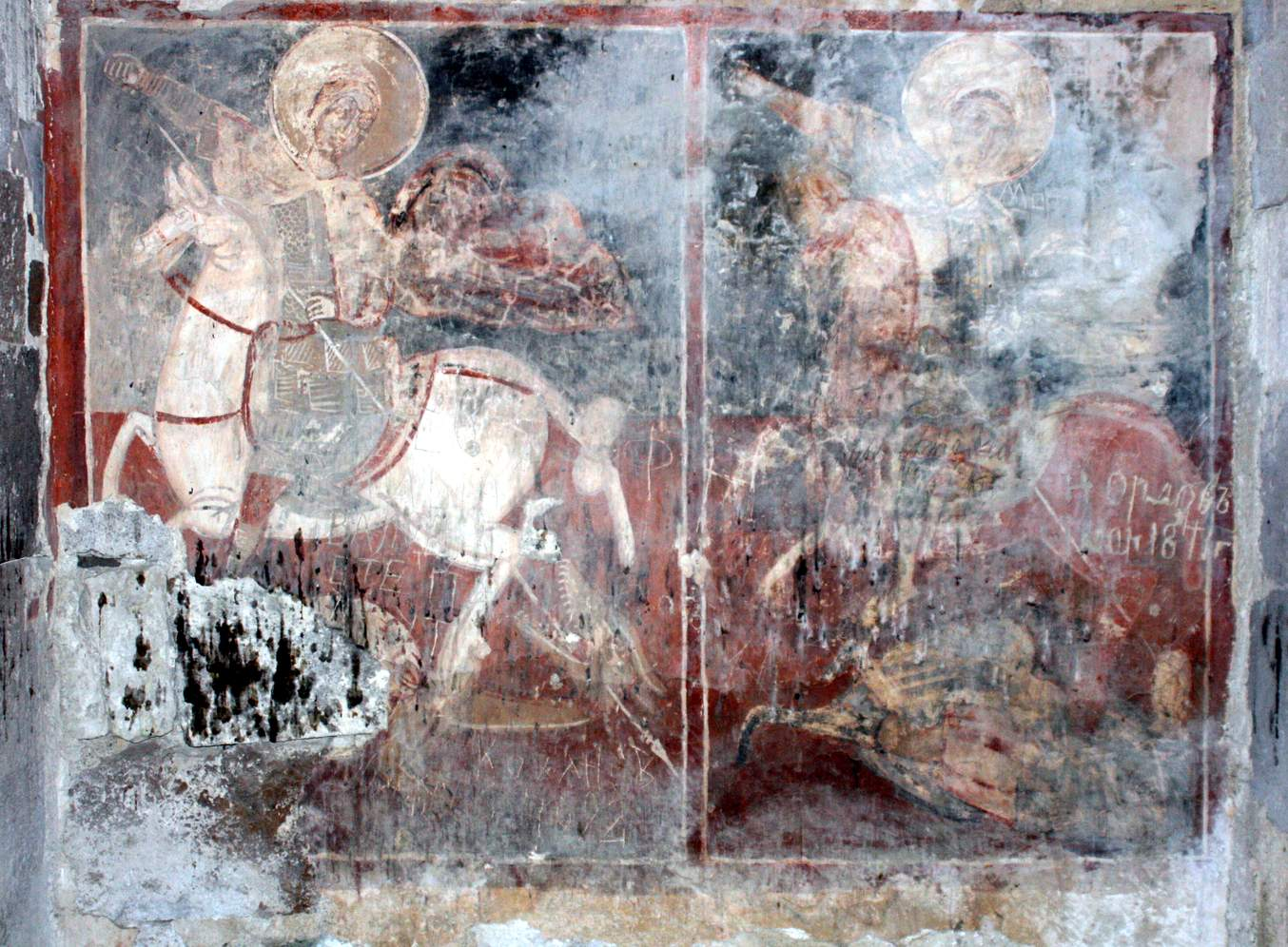
Remains of the frescoes in the main church.

The Gudarekhi monastery is perched on a wooded hill, west of the eponymous village. The complex is enclosed by a ruined wall, within which most of the structures are located. The main church, of the Theotokos, is a hall church design, measuring 16.2 × 9.5 m without annexes, and built of smoothly hewn yellowish stone blocks. It ends in a semicircular apse to the east and has the only entrance to the south. The eastern facade is adorned with decorative stone-carvings, inspired by an example of the earlier domed churches in Georgia. The southern wall, at the entrance, carries a seven-line inscription in the medieval Georgian asomtavruli script, which mentions the architect Chichaporisdze, Queen Rusudan, her children, and the bishop Anton of Manglisi.

The interior is painted with the faded, partially fallen frescoes of the Archangels—accompanied by the 17th-century Greek inscriptions identifying Michael and Gabriel—and the saints George, Demetrius, and Theodore. Inscriptions in Georgian on the altar murals are now barely legible. The surviving fragments of a 12th-century stone iconostasis have been removed for preservation at the Georgian National Museum in Tbilisi. The north end of the church is flanked by an apsed eukterion, a later annex in the north wall of which there are two stones with the 10th–12th-century Georgian inscriptions—apparently, remains of an earlier structure. Another annex, to the south, was a columnated narthex which is now in ruins.

Southeast of the church is a free-standing stone bell-tower built in a rectangular plan. Completed in 1278, it is the oldest extant dated bell-tower in Georgia. It is a two-storey building, with the lower level open, the upper one being a hypostyle hall with eight arched pillars, and a small cell rested in between them. An asomtavruli inscription on the eastern wall commemorates King Demetrius II of Georgia and the priest Abraham.
