= Çitliköy, Maden =

Village in Turkey

Çitliköy
- Village
- Location in Turkey
- Coordinates: 38°28′N 39°33′E
- Country: Turkey
- Province: Elazığ
- District: Maden
- Population (2021): 211
- Time zone: UTC+3 (TRT)

Çitliköy is a village in the Maden District of Elazığ Province in Turkey. Its population is 211 (2021).
