= Altıntarla, Maden =

Village in Turkey

Altıntarla
- Village
- Location in Turkey
- Coordinates: 38°24′N 39°27′E
- Country: Turkey
- Province: Elazığ
- District: Maden
- Population (2021): 129
- Time zone: UTC+3 (TRT)

Altıntarla is a village in the Maden District of Elazığ Province in Turkey. Its population is 129 (2021).
