= Kutlu, Ardanuç =

Kutlu
- Village
- Location within Turkey
- Coordinates: 41.1935°N 42.2138°E
- Country: Turkey
- Province: Artvin
- District: Ardanuç
- Population (2021): 96
- Time zone: UTC+3 (TRT)

Kutlu is a village in the Ardanuç District, Artvin Province, Turkey. Its population is 96 (2021).
