= Plajköy, Maden =

Village in Turkey

Plajköy
- Village
- Location in Turkey
- Coordinates: 38°30′N 39°30′E
- Country: Turkey
- Province: Elazığ
- District: Maden
- Population (2021): 160
- Time zone: UTC+3 (TRT)

Plajköy is a village in the Maden District of Elazığ Province in Turkey. Its population is 160 (2021).
