= Meşeköy, Ardanuç =

Meşeköy
- Village
- Location within Turkey
- Coordinates: 41°01′51″N 41°58′38″E
- Country: Turkey
- Province: Artvin
- District: Ardanuç
- Population (2021): 64
- Time zone: UTC+3 (TRT)

Meşeköy is a village in the Ardanuç District, Artvin Province, Turkey. Its population is 64 (2021).
