= Gudarekhi =

Village in Kvemo Kartli, Georgia

Coordinates: 41°35′N 44°27′E

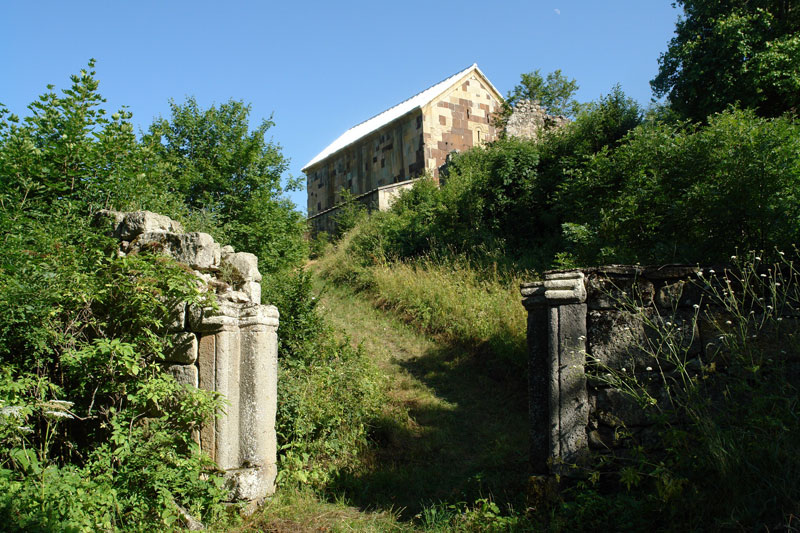
The Gudarekhi monastery

Gudarekhi (Georgian: გუდარეხი) is a village in Kvemo Kartli, Georgia, notable for a nearby monastic complex and archaeological site. It is located on a hill some 8 km north from the town Tetritsqaro, southwest of Georgia’s capital Tbilisi. There is a kvajvari dating back to the 13th century in the village.

A large-scale archaeological research of the area was carried out in 1938 and 1939. It revealed the remnants of a medieval urban settlement with well-developed pottery production. The complex consists of a ruined palace, living premises, a wine cellar, a pilastered building, and several other structures which date from the 12th-13th and 16th-17th centuries.

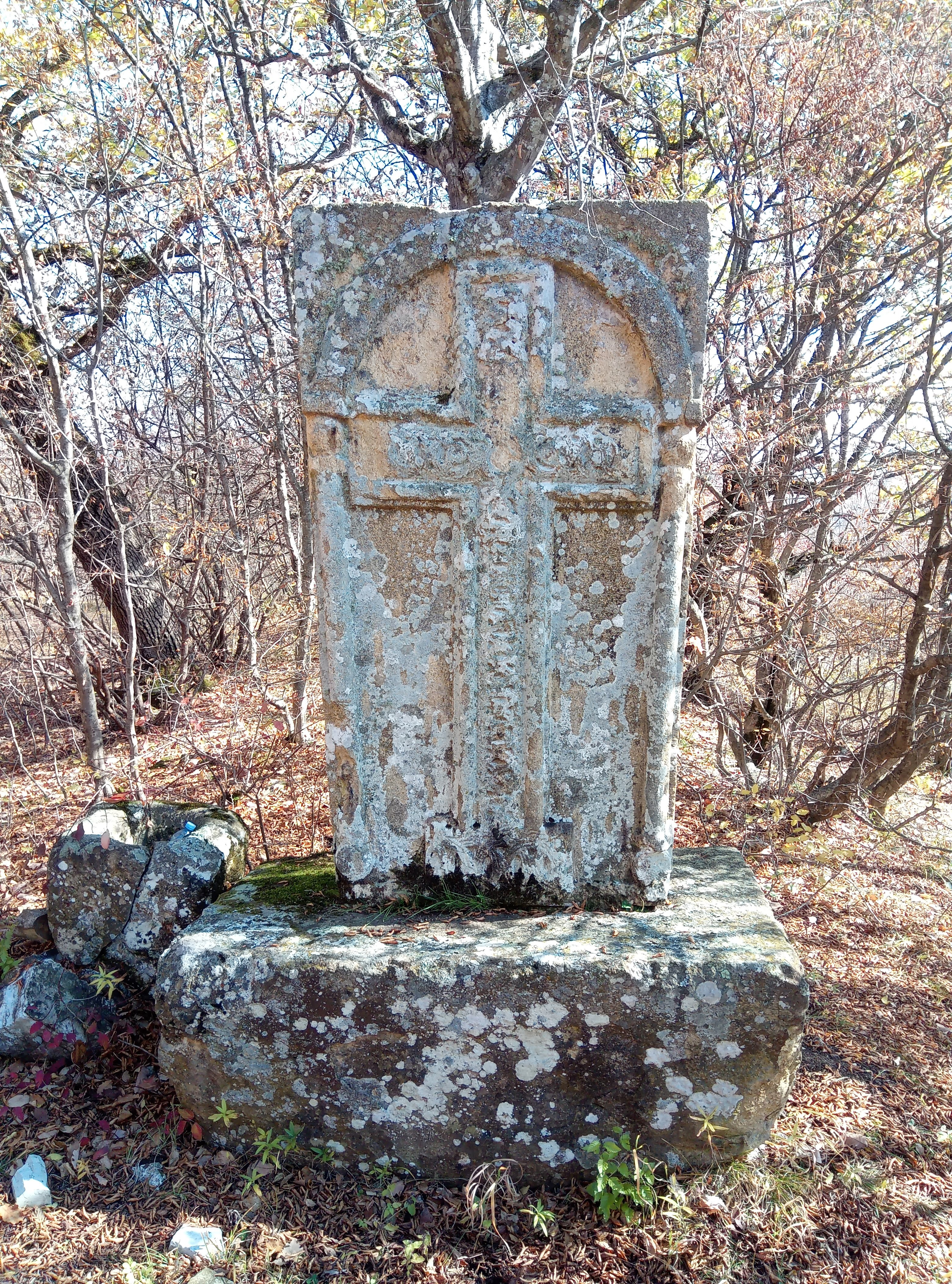
Kvajvari in Gudarekhi, 13th century

To the south of the ruined settlement lies the Gudarekhi monastery consisting of a single nave church and a free-standing two-storey bell-tower. The church was commissioned from the architect Chichaporisdze in the 13th century. It is built of well hewn stones, with richly incrustated and decorated façades. The church formerly possessed an avidly decorated iconostasis which is now on display at the Art Museum of Georgia in Tbilisi. The bell-tower was erected during the reign of Demetre II of Georgia in 1278. The complex was repaired in 2006.

== See also ==
- Kvemo Kartli
