= Polatköy, Maden =

Village in Turkey

Polatköy
- Village
- Location in Turkey
- Coordinates: 38°20′26″N 39°24′22″E
- Country: Turkey
- Province: Elazığ
- District: Maden
- Population (2021): 79
- Time zone: UTC+3 (TRT)

Polatköy is a village in the Maden District of Elazığ Province in Turkey. Its population is 79 (2021).
