= İncilli, Ardanuç =

İncilli
- Village
- Location within Turkey
- Country: Turkey
- Province: Artvin
- District: Ardanuç
- Population (2021): 86
- Time zone: UTC+3 (TRT)

İncilli is a village in the Ardanuç District, Artvin Province, Turkey. Its population is 86 (2021).
