= Durmuştepe, Maden =

Village in Turkey

Durmuştepe
- Village
- Location in Turkey
- Coordinates: 38°26′03″N 39°28′15″E
- Country: Turkey
- Province: Elazığ
- District: Maden
- Population (2021): 252
- Time zone: UTC+3 (TRT)

Durmuştepe is a village in the Maden District of Elazığ Province in Turkey. Its population is 252 (2021).
