= Müezzinler, Ardanuç =

Müezzinler
- Village
- Location within Turkey
- Coordinates: 41.0898°N 42.1467°E
- Country: Turkey
- Province: Artvin
- District: Ardanuç
- Population (2021): 60
- Time zone: UTC+3 (TRT)

Müezzinler is a village in the Ardanuç District, Artvin Province, Turkey. Its population is 60 (2021).
