= Ballı, Ardanuç =

Ballı
- Village
- Location within Turkey
- Coordinates: 41.0148°N 42.1801°E
- Country: Turkey
- Province: Artvin
- District: Ardanuç
- Population (2021): 134
- Time zone: UTC+3 (TRT)

Ballı is a village in the Ardanuç District, Artvin Province, Turkey, at an elevation of 1,788 m. Its population is 134 (2021). The village lies 65 km from the provincial center of Artvin and 30 km from the district center of Ardanuç.

== History ==
The former name of the village of Ballı was Gulice or Gulica, appearing in various sources as Gulica/Gulice (كولیجە). The name Gulica (გულიჯა) is thought to derive from "Glirca" (გლირჯა), which appears in the Georgian manuscript Tbetis Sulta Matiane, a record of donors to Tbeti Church, and to have changed over time.

Gulica was one of the settlements of Klarjeti, one of the historical regions forming the southwestern part of medieval Georgia. The Ottoman Empire seized this region from the Georgians in the mid-16th century. Although the neighbouring village of Zekeriyaköy (Zağaria) appears in the Ottoman land registers Defter-i Mufassal-i Vilayet-i Gürcistan (1574) and Defter-i Mufassal-i Liva-i Ardanuç (1595), Gulica's name does not appear in these records.

Following the Russo-Turkish War (1877–1878), the village of Gulica was ceded by the Ottoman Empire to Russia under the terms of the Treaty of Berlin as part of the war indemnity. Recorded as Gülica (Гюлиджа) in the Russian administration's 1886 census, the village was one of seven villages of the Longothevi district (nahiye), part of the Ardanuç county of Artvin sanjak. Its population consisted of 297 people (148 male, 149 female) living in 48 households, all of whom were recorded as Turkish.

Some time after Russian forces withdrew from the region at the end of World War I, the village of Gulica came within the borders of the independent Democratic Republic of Georgia. Under the Treaty of Moscow, signed on 7 May 1920 between Georgia and Soviet Russia, Soviet Russia recognized the Artvin region as part of Georgia. However, the following year, during the Red Army invasion of Georgia, the Artvin region — including the village of Gulica — was ceded to Turkey under the Treaty of Moscow signed between the Ankara Government and Soviet Russia.

According to the 1922 population register, Gulica was administratively attached to the Ardanuç nahiye of Artvin sanjak (later vilayet), with 39 people living in 10 households. The village's population was again recorded as "Turkish" at this date. The name Gulica was changed to Ballı in 1925. In the 1935 general census, the village was attached to the Ardanuç nahiye of the Artvin kaza of Çoruh Province, which had been established in place of the former Rize and Artvin provinces; the village's population had risen to 307. In the 1965 general census, 494 people lived in the village of Ballı, of whom 244 were literate.

Two kilometres north of the village, on a steep rock on the right bank of the Ardanuç stream, is a natural cave with a walled-up entrance; directly opposite it, atop a steep rock on the left bank of the stream, are the remains of what is probably a water cistern belonging to a castle.

== Demographics ==
Village population by year
2021	134
2020	129
2019	136
2018	101
2017	157
2016	162
2015	160
2014	169
2013	147
2012	141
2011	176
2010	175
2009	169
2008	173
2007	194
2000	220
1990	267
1985	329
