= Küçükova, Maden =

Village in Turkey

Küçükova
- Village
- Location in Turkey
- Coordinates: 38°32′32″N 39°32′31″E
- Country: Turkey
- Province: Elazığ
- District: Maden
- Population (2021): 106
- Time zone: UTC+3 (TRT)

Küçükova is a village in the Maden District of Elazığ Province in Turkey. Its population is 106 (2021).
