= Maden District =

- District
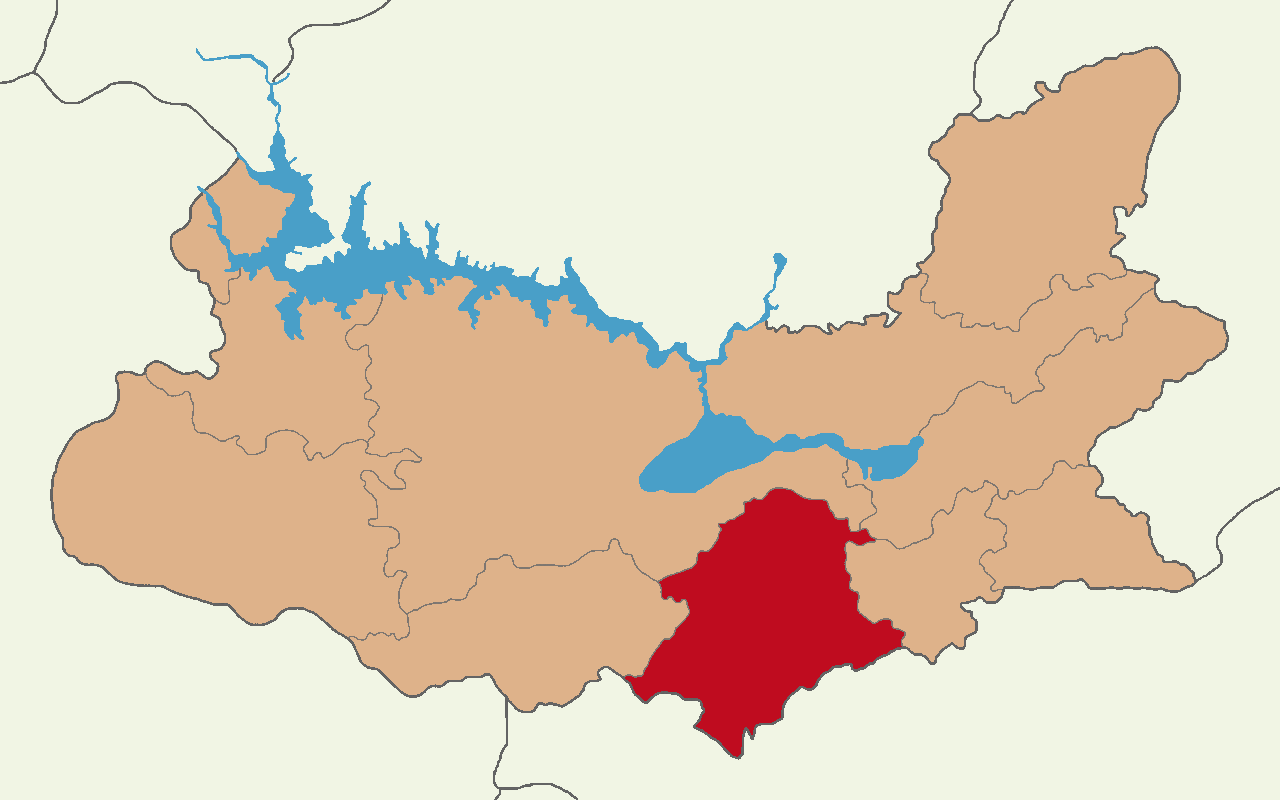
- Map showing Maden District in Elazığ Province

- Location in Turkey
- Coordinates: 38°23′N 39°40′E
- Country: Turkey
- Province: Elazığ
- Seat: Maden

Government
  - Kaymakam: Önder Bozkurt
- Area: 819 km^{2} (316 sq mi)
- Population (2021): 9,693
  - Density: 12/km^{2} (31/sq mi)
- Time zone: UTC+3 (TRT)

Maden District is a district of Elazığ Province of Turkey. Its seat is the town Maden. Its area is 819 km^{2}, and its population is 9,693 (2021).

== Composition ==
There is 1 municipality in Maden District:

- Maden

There are 38 villages in Maden District:

- Ağadibek
- Akboğa
- Altıntarla
- Arslantaşı
- Bahçedere
- Cumhuriyetçi
- Çakıroğlu
- Çalkaya
- Çayırköy
- Çitliköy
- Durmuştepe
- Dutpınar
- Eğrikavak
- Gezin
- Hanevleri
- Hatunköy
- Işıktepe
- Karatop
- Kartaldere
- Kaşlıca
- Kavak
- Kayalar
- Kızıltepe
- Koçkonağı
- Kumyazı
- Küçükova
- Naldöken
- Örtülü
- Plajköy
- Polatköy
- Sağrılı
- Tekevler
- Tepecik
- Topaluşağı
- Yenibahçe
- Yeşilova
- Yıldızhan
- Yoncapınar
