= Gümüşhane, Ardanuç =

Gümüşhane
- Village
- Location within Turkey
- Coordinates: 41.1218°N 41.9498°E
- Country: Turkey
- Province: Artvin
- District: Ardanuç
- Population (2021): 74
- Time zone: UTC+3 (TRT)

Gümüşhane is a village in the Ardanuç District, Artvin Province, Turkey. Its population is 74 (2021).
