= Tepecik, Maden =

Village in Turkey

Tepecik
- Village
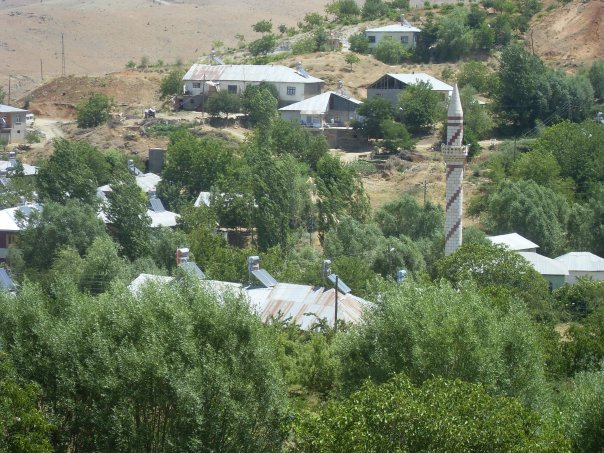

- Location within Turkey
- Coordinates: 38°31′50″N 39°35′49″E
- Country: Turkey
- Province: Elazığ
- District: Maden
- Population (2021): 113
- Time zone: UTC+3 (TRT)

Tepecik is a village in the Maden District of Elazığ Province in Turkey. Its population is 113 (2021).
