= Ekşinar, Ardanuç =

Ekşinar
- Village
- Location within Turkey
- Coordinates: 41°06′N 42°03′E
- Country: Turkey
- Province: Artvin
- District: Ardanuç
- Population (2021): 116
- Time zone: UTC+3 (TRT)

Ekşinar is a village in the Ardanuç District, Artvin Province, Turkey. Its population is 116 (2021).
