= Bağlıca, Ardanuç =

Bağlıca
- Village
- Location within Turkey
- Coordinates: 41.2394°N 42.1295°E
- Country: Turkey
- Province: Artvin
- District: Ardanuç
- Population (2021): 166
- Time zone: UTC+3 (TRT)

Bağlıca is a village in the Ardanuç District, Artvin Province, Turkey. Its population is 166 (2021).
