= Kayalar, Maden =

Village in Turkey

Kayalar
- Village
- Location in Turkey
- Coordinates: 38°28′25″N 39°38′42″E
- Country: Turkey
- Province: Elazığ
- District: Maden
- Population (2021): 80
- Time zone: UTC+3 (TRT)

Kayalar is a village in the Maden District of Elazığ Province in Turkey. Its population is 80 (2021).
