= Eğrikavak, Maden =

Village in Turkey

Eğrikavak
- Village
- Location in Turkey
- Coordinates: 38°21′23″N 39°29′52″E
- Country: Turkey
- Province: Elazığ
- District: Maden
- Population (2021): 143
- Time zone: UTC+3 (TRT)

Eğrikavak is a village in the Maden District of Elazığ Province in Turkey. Its population is 143 (2021).
