= Köroğlu, Şenkaya =

Village in Turkey

Köroğlu
- Neighbourhood
- Country: Turkey
- Province: Erzurum
- District: Şenkaya
- Population (2022): 320
- Time zone: UTC+3 (TRT)

Köroğlu is a neighbourhood in the municipality and district of Şenkaya, Erzurum Province in Turkey. Its population is 320 (2022).

Köroğlu's former name was Tkhaskurki. Tkhaskurki (თხასქურქი), a Georgian place name, may have evolved from Tkhaskhori (თხასხორი). This place name is recorded as Tghaskurk (طغاس كورك) in the 1595 Ottoman mufassal defter and in the 1694-1732 period cebe defter of the Çıldır Province (Çıldır Eyaleti).

There are five castle ruins in the village of Köroğlu. On a kvajvari (cross stone) in the village, the following is carved in the Asomtavruli script of the Georgian alphabet: "წ[მიდა]ო / გ[იორგ]ი / შ [ეიწყალ]ე / გ[ლა]ხ[ა]კი / ...“ (”Saint George, forgive the orphaned ...") is carved in the Asomtavruli script of the Georgian alphabet. At the site of the church, located in a rocky valley 3.5 kilometers southeast of the settlement, mortar wall fragments, cut stones, and large building stones remain. The fact that the church's patterned stones have been washed into the stream indicates that this structure was destroyed by human hands.
