= Yoncapınar, Maden =

Village in Turkey

Yoncapınar
- Village
- Location in Turkey
- Coordinates: 38°28′N 39°26′E
- Country: Turkey
- Province: Elazığ
- District: Maden
- Population (2021): 29
- Time zone: UTC+3 (TRT)

Yoncapınar is a village in the Maden District of Elazığ Province in Turkey. Its population is 29 (2021).
