= Kumyazı, Maden =

Village in Turkey

Kumyazı
- Village
- Location in Turkey
- Coordinates: 38°34′N 39°40′E
- Country: Turkey
- Province: Elazığ
- District: Maden
- Population (2021): 151
- Time zone: UTC+3 (TRT)

Kumyazı is a village in the Maden District of Elazığ Province in Turkey. Its population is 151 (2021).
