= Torbalı, Ardanuç =

Torbalı
- Village
- Location within Turkey
- Coordinates: 41.0739°N 42.0367°E
- Country: Turkey
- Province: Artvin
- District: Ardanuç
- Population (2021): 41
- Time zone: UTC+3 (TRT)

Torbalı is a village in the Ardanuç District, Artvin Province, Turkey. Its population is 41 (2021).
