= Geçitli, Ardanuç =

Geçitli
- Village
- Location within Turkey
- Coordinates: 41°02′25″N 42°14′32″E
- Country: Turkey
- Province: Artvin
- District: Ardanuç
- Population (2021): 217
- Time zone: UTC+3 (TRT)

Geçitli is a village in the Ardanuç District, Artvin Province, Turkey. Its population is 217 (2021).
