= Soğanlı, Ardanuç =

Soğanlı
- Village
- Location within Turkey
- Coordinates: 41.1718°N 42.0186°E
- Country: Turkey
- Province: Artvin
- District: Ardanuç
- Population (2021): 98
- Time zone: UTC+3 (TRT)

Soğanlı is a village in the Ardanuç District, Artvin Province, Turkey. Its population is 98 (2021).
