= Yolüstü, Ardanuç =

Yolüstü
- Village
- Location within Turkey
- Coordinates: 41.1521°N 42.0648°E
- Country: Turkey
- Province: Artvin
- District: Ardanuç
- Population (2021): 202
- Time zone: UTC+3 (TRT)

Yolüstü is a village in the Ardanuç District, Artvin Province, Turkey. Its population is 202 (2021).
