= Cumhuriyetçi, Maden =

Village in Turkey

Cumhuriyetçi
- Village
- Location in Turkey
- Coordinates: 38°31′N 39°38′E
- Country: Turkey
- Province: Elazığ
- District: Maden
- Population (2021): 95
- Time zone: UTC+3 (TRT)

Cumhuriyetçi is a village in the Maden District of Elazığ Province in Turkey. Its population is 95 (2021).
