= Yeşilova, Maden =

Village in Turkey

Yeşilova
- Village
- Location in Turkey
- Coordinates: 38°32′55″N 39°33′42″E
- Country: Turkey
- Province: Elazığ
- District: Maden
- Population (2021): 42
- Time zone: UTC+3 (TRT)

Yeşilova is a village in the Maden District of Elazığ Province in Turkey. Its population is 42 (2021).
