= Kartaldere, Maden =

Village in Turkey

Kartaldere
- Village
- Location within Turkey
- Coordinates: 38°33′49″N 39°36′45″E
- Country: Turkey
- Province: Elazığ
- District: Maden
- Population (2021): 235
- Time zone: UTC+3 (TRT)

Kartaldere is a village in the Maden District of Elazığ Province in Turkey. Its population is 235 (2021).
