= Aydınköy, Ardanuç =

Aydınköy
- Village
- Location within Turkey
- Coordinates: 41.0427°N 42.0964°E
- Country: Turkey
- Province: Artvin
- District: Ardanuç
- Population (2021): 357
- Time zone: UTC+3 (TRT)

Aydınköy is a village in the Ardanuç District, Artvin Province, Turkey. Its population is 357 (2021). Its historical Georgian name is Skhlobani (სხლობანი).
