= Çayırköy, Maden =

Village in Turkey

Çayırköy
- Village
- Location in Turkey
- Coordinates: 38°22′52″N 39°35′39″E
- Country: Turkey
- Province: Elazığ
- District: Maden
- Population (2021): 104
- Time zone: UTC+3 (TRT)

Çayırköy is a village in the Maden District of Elazığ Province in Turkey. Its population is 104 (2021).
