= Çakıllar, Ardanuç =

Çakıllar
- Village
- Location within Turkey
- Coordinates: 41.2294°N 42.1254°E
- Country: Turkey
- Province: Artvin
- District: Ardanuç
- Population (2021): 68
- Time zone: UTC+3 (TRT)

Çakıllar is a village in the Ardanuç District, Artvin Province, Turkey. Its population is 68 (2021).
