= Zekeriyaköy, Ardanuç =

Zekeriyaköy
- Village
- Location within Turkey
- Coordinates: 40.9843°N 42.1532°E
- Country: Turkey
- Province: Artvin
- District: Ardanuç
- Population (2021): 85
- Time zone: UTC+3 (TRT)

Zekeriyaköy is a village in the Ardanuç District, Artvin Province, Turkey. Its population is 85 (2021).
