= Aşıklar, Ardanuç =

Aşıklar
- Village
- Location within Turkey
- Coordinates: 41.0959°N 42.1396°E
- Country: Turkey
- Province: Artvin
- District: Ardanuç
- Population (2021): 42
- Time zone: UTC+3 (TRT)

Aşıklar is a village in the Ardanuç District, Artvin Province, Turkey. Its population is 42 (2021).

The historical name of the village of Aşıklar, Shavgulari (შავგულარი), may be derived from the Georgian word "shavguli" (შავგული).
