= Naldöken, Ardanuç =

Naldöken
- Village
- Location within Turkey
- Country: Turkey
- Province: Artvin
- District: Ardanuç
- Population (2021): 35
- Time zone: UTC+3 (TRT)

Naldöken is a village in the Ardanuç District, Artvin Province, Turkey. Its population is 35 (2021).
