= Kaşlıca, Maden =

Village in Turkey

Kaşlıca
- Village
- Location in Turkey
- Coordinates: 38°28′34″N 39°40′34″E
- Country: Turkey
- Province: Elazığ
- District: Maden
- Population (2021): 53
- Time zone: UTC+3 (TRT)

Kaşlıca is a village in the Maden District of Elazığ Province in Turkey. Its population is 53 (2021).
