= Örtülü, Ardanuç =

Örtülü
- Village
- Location within Turkey
- Coordinates: 41.0699°N 42.0230°E
- Country: Turkey
- Province: Artvin
- District: Ardanuç
- Population (2021): 56
- Time zone: UTC+3 (TRT)

Örtülü is a village in the Ardanuç District, Artvin Province, Turkey. Its population is 56 (2021).
