= Yenibahçe, Maden =

Village in Turkey

Yenibahçe
- Village
- Location in Turkey
- Coordinates: 38°24′45″N 39°31′51″E
- Country: Turkey
- Province: Elazığ
- District: Maden
- Population (2021): 74
- Time zone: UTC+3 (TRT)

Yenibahçe is a village in the Maden District of Elazığ Province in Turkey. Its population is 74 (2021).
