= Kızılcık, Ardanuç =

Kızılcık
- Village
- Location within Turkey
- Coordinates: 41.1245°N 42.0973°E
- Country: Turkey
- Province: Artvin
- District: Ardanuç
- Population (2021): 231
- Time zone: UTC+3 (TRT)

Kızılcık is a village in the Ardanuç District, Artvin Province, Turkey. Its population is 231 (2021).
