= Hisarlı, Ardanuç =

Hisarlı
- Village
- Location within Turkey
- Coordinates: 41.1863°N 42.1874°E
- Country: Turkey
- Province: Artvin
- District: Ardanuç
- Population (2021): 46
- Time zone: UTC+3 (TRT)

Hisarlı is a village in the Ardanuç District, Artvin Province, Turkey. Its population is 46 (2021).
