= Yolağzı, Ardanuç =

Yolağzı Kontromi
- Village
- Location within Turkey
- Coordinates: 41°9′49″N 42°11′11″E
- Country: Turkey
- Province: Artvin
- District: Ardanuç
- Population (2021): 43
- Time zone: UTC+3 (TRT)

Yolağzı (formerly: Kontromi) is a village in the Ardanuç District, Artvin Province, Turkey. Its population is 43 (2021).
