= Çalkaya, Maden =

Village in Turkey

Çalkaya
- Village
- Location in Turkey
- Coordinates: 38.3278°N 39.5169°E
- Country: Turkey
- Province: Elazığ
- District: Maden
- Elevation: 1,276 m (4,186 ft)
- Population (2021): 278
- Time zone: UTC+3 (TRT)
- Postal code: 23402
- Area code: 0424

Çalkaya is a village in the Maden District of Elazığ Province in Turkey. Its population is 278 (2021).

== History ==
In the records of 1925, the village's name appears as Kıllikan.

== Geography ==
The village is 96 km from the provincial centre of Elazığ and 30 km from the district centre of Maden.

== Population ==
Village population by year
2021	278
2020	277
2019	322
2018	422
2017	343
2016	341
2015	340
2014	346
2013	436
2012	406
2011	426
2010	457
2009	460
2008	452
2007	463
2000	508
1990	483
1985	492
