= Naldöken, Maden =

Village in Turkey

Naldöken
- Village
- Location in Turkey
- Coordinates: 38°16′45″N 39°32′1″E
- Country: Turkey
- Province: Elazığ
- District: Maden
- Population (2021): 370
- Time zone: UTC+3 (TRT)

Naldöken is a village in the Maden District of Elazığ Province in Turkey. Its population is 370 (2021).
