= Harmanlı, Ardanuç =

Harmanlı
- Village
- Location within Turkey
- Coordinates: 41.1099°N 42.0850°E
- Country: Turkey
- Province: Artvin
- District: Ardanuç
- Population (2021): 172
- Time zone: UTC+3 (TRT)

Harmanlı is a village in the Ardanuç District, Artvin Province, Turkey. Its population is 172 (2021).
