= Örtülü, Maden =

Village in Turkey

Örtülü
- Village
- Location in Turkey
- Coordinates: 38°32′27″N 39°40′57″E
- Country: Turkey
- Province: Elazığ
- District: Maden
- Population (2021): 74
- Time zone: UTC+3 (TRT)

Örtülü is a village in the Maden District of Elazığ Province in Turkey. Its population is 74 (2021).
