= Işıktepe, Maden =

Village in Turkey

Işıktepe
- Village
- Location in Turkey
- Coordinates: 38°26′25″N 39°31′25″E
- Country: Turkey
- Province: Elazığ
- District: Maden
- Population (2021): 103
- Time zone: UTC+3 (TRT)

Işıktepe is a village in the Maden District of Elazığ Province in Turkey. Its population is 103 (2021).
