= Ardanuç District =

District of Artvin Province, Turkey

- District
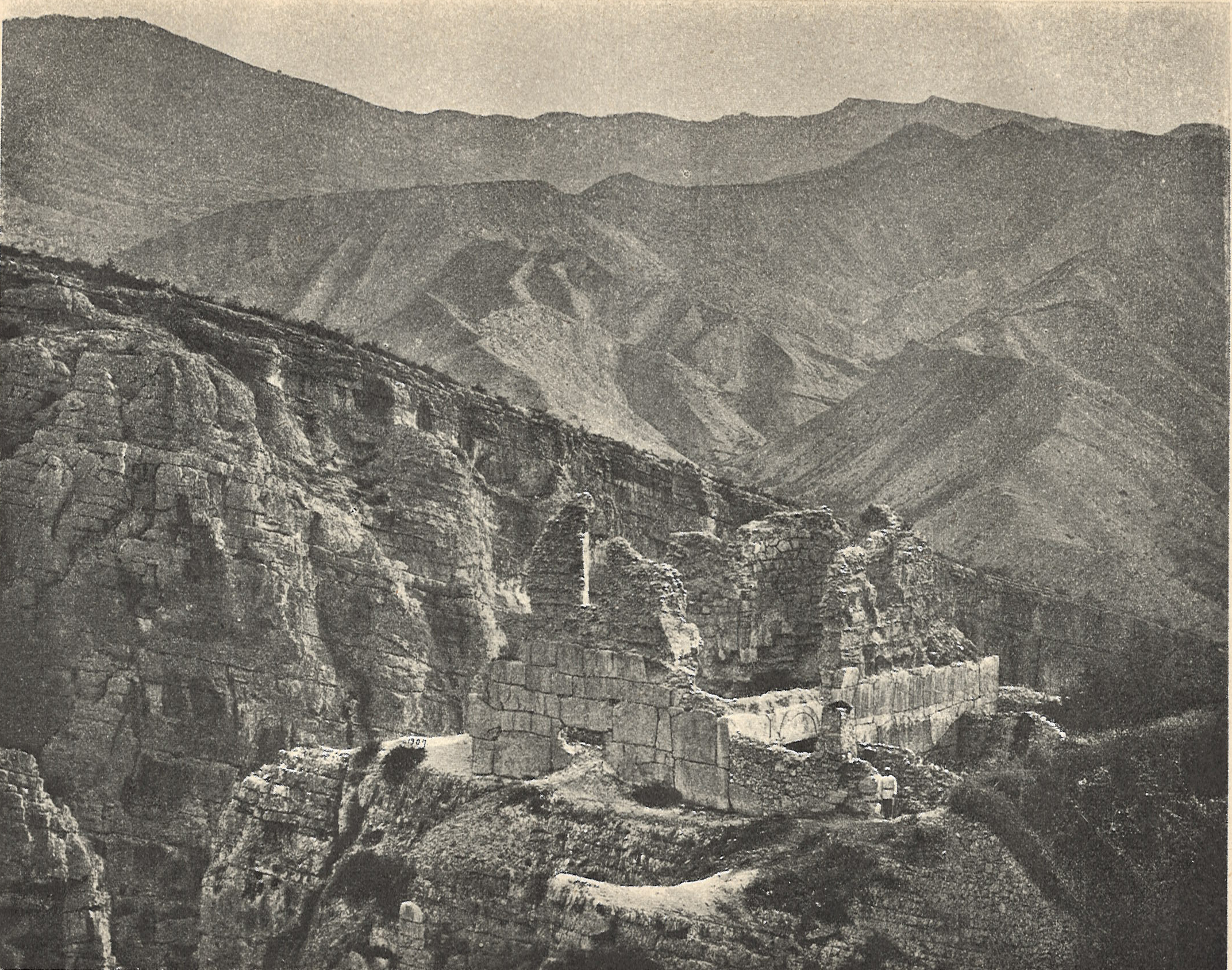
- ruins of a church, Ardanuç, 1911

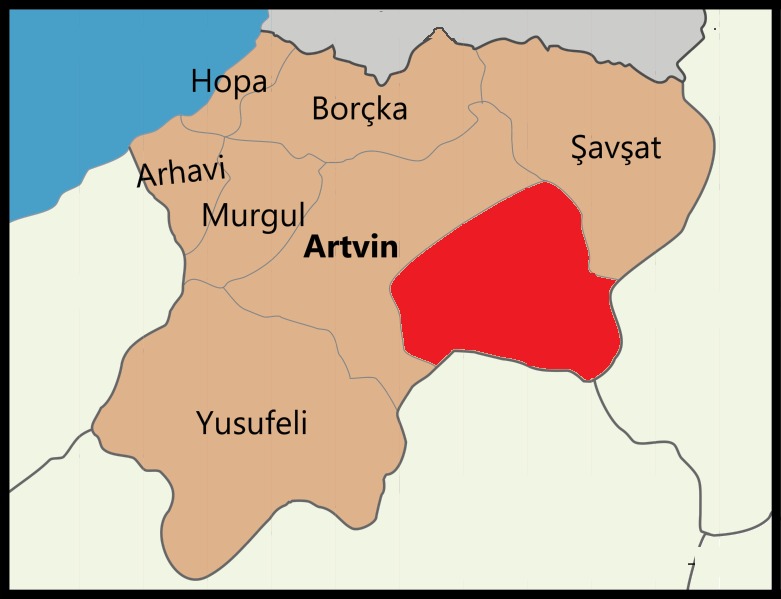
- Map showing Ardanuç District in Artvin Province

- Location within Turkey
- Coordinates: 41°08′N 42°04′E
- Country: Turkey
- Province: Artvin
- Seat: Ardanuç

Government
  - Kaymakam: Ahmet Salih Poçanoğlu
- Area: 958 km^{2} (370 sq mi)
- Population (2021): 11,198
  - Density: 11.7/km^{2} (30.3/sq mi)
- Time zone: UTC+3 (TRT)
- Website: www.ardanuc.gov.tr

Ardanuç District is a district of Artvin Province of Turkey. Its seat is the town Ardanuç. Its area is 958 km^{2}, and its population is 11,198 (2021).

== Composition ==
There is one municipality in Ardanuç District:

- Ardanuç

There are 49 villages in Ardanuç District:

- Akarsu
- Anaçlı
- Aşağıırmaklar
- Aşıklar
- Avcılar
- Aydınköy
- Bağlıca
- Ballı
- Beratlı
- Bereket
- Boyalı
- Bulanık
- Çakıllar
- Cevizlik
- Çıralar
- Ekşinar
- Ferhatlı
- Geçitli
- Gökçe
- Güleş
- Gümüşhane
- Hamurlu
- Harmanlı
- Hisarlı
- İncilli
- Kapıköy
- Karlı
- Kaşıkçı
- Kızılcık
- Konaklı
- Kutlu
- Meşeköy
- Müezzinler
- Naldöken
- Örtülü
- Ovacık
- Peynirli
- Sakarya
- Soğanlı
- Tepedüzü
- Torbalı
- Tosunlu
- Tütünlü
- Ustalar
- Yaylacık
- Yolağzı
- Yolüstü
- Yukarıırmaklar
- Zekeriyaköy
