= Kazimiye, Kemalpaşa =

Kazimiye Veyisarp Molisor(i)
- Village
- Location in Turkey
- Coordinates: 41.5109°N 41.5635°E
- Country: Turkey
- Province: Artvin
- District: Kemalpaşa
- Population (2021): 173
- Time zone: UTC+3 (TRT)

Kazimiye, formerly named Molisor (Laz: მოლისორი, romanized: molisori) until 1928 is a village in the Kemalpaşa District, Artvin Province, Turkey. Its population is 173 (2021). The village is known to its Hemshin inhabitants as Veyisarp. (Note: From Armenian: Վերի Սարբ, romanized: Veri Sarp meaning “upper Sarp”)
