= Ikizdere quarry protests =

2021 protests in Turkey

Ikizdere quarry protests were protests organized in Turkey by residents of the villages of GurDere and Cevizlik in the Ikizdere district of Rize, who opposed the construction of a quarry near their villages in the Işkencedere (Eskenci) Valley.

The local residents began their resistance in April 2021 when Cengiz Construction brought heavy machinery into the valley for construction work. This led to confrontations with law enforcement. After eight months of resistance, in December 2021, the residents were removed from the area as part of an urgent expropriation decision, their tents were demolished, and the site was handed over to the company.

== Background ==
In 2013, the Ministry of Environment and Urbanization designated a 132-hectare area in the Iyidere district as a "Special Project Zone." Later that year, an amendment expanded the project area to 214 hectares, and it was designated as an "Industrial Development Zone." A logistics port (container, general cargo, and ro-ro port) was planned to be built on land reclaimed from the Black Sea, located north of the Industrial Development Zone. It was determined that the Işkencedere Valley, a side valley of the Ikizdere Valley, contained stone resistant to seawater, which would be used in the construction of this port. According to opponents, although basalt is common in the region, the Işkencedere Valley was chosen due to its short distance (about 35 km) from the planned Iyidere filling area.

The local population, who make their living through tea farming and producing a special honey known as "mad honey," opposed the quarry project, arguing that the environmental destruction caused by the project would make it impossible for the residents of Cevizlik and GurDere to continue living in the area.

== Legal battle and protests ==
In 2019, various companies attempted to establish a quarry in the valley; however, local residents filed lawsuits and halted these attempts through court decisions. After the Iyidere Logistics Port project on the coast was awarded to Cengiz Construction in September 2020, it was decided to rapidly establish a quarry located 1800 meters from the village of Cevizlik and 2500 meters from Gürdere village, with the quarry project planned by the Ministry of Transport and Infrastructure.

In January 2021, the Ministry of Transport and Infrastructure applied for a license from the Ministry of Environment and Urbanization for the quarry, and approval was granted with a "No Environmental Impact Assessment (EIA) Required" decision. Local residents, environmental organizations, and chambers affiliated with the Union of Chambers of Turkish Engineers and Architects (TMMOB) filed a lawsuit to annul this decision. While the lawsuit was ongoing, an "Urgent Expropriation" decision for the land in question was published in the Official Gazette on March 19, 2021, by presidential decree.

On April 20, 2021, villagers began maintaining a vigil in the area. Cengiz Construction's heavy machinery entered the area on April 21. Villagers set up tents at the entrance of Gürdere village and resisted to prevent the entry of heavy machinery. The machinery retreated after residents' resistance but returned on April 23, when a three-day curfew was declared in the area. On April 25, as villagers set up barricades in front of the machinery, gendarmerie forces intervened with tear gas and batons, detaining several villagers. The resistance drew public attention with images of violence on April 25. The Rize Governorship imposed a ban on press statements, protests, marches, and similar activities in open spaces in Ikizdere. The Minister of Transport, Adil Karaismailoğlu, visited the district to persuade the villagers but was sent off with protests, as locals claimed they were being deceived.

At the end of an eight-month resistance, villagers were removed from the area in December 2021 under the urgent expropriation decision; their tents were demolished, and the site was transferred to the company. Properties affected by the quarry and the connecting road were demolished.

The EIA annulment lawsuit for the quarry was heard on August 3, 2022. Unlike the annulment cases in 2019, the court rejected the annulment request in this case.

== Reactions ==
The leader of the Republican People's Party, Kemal Kılıçdaroğlu, addressed the local residents during a party group meeting held on April 27, 2021, expressing his support for them.

Turkish pop music artist Tarkan shared a statement on his social media accounts, expressing his support for the villagers' resistance.

Sezen Aksu released a written statement, voicing her opposition to the planned stone quarry in İşkencedere Valley.

Habertürk columnist Fatih Altaylı wrote an opinion piece titled "Stone, Port, Ballot Box," highlighting the irreversible damage caused by stone quarries to the environment.
