= Güzelyalı =

Güzelyalı is a place name in Turkish and may refer to:

- Güzelyalı, Çanakkale
- Güzelyalı, Elâzığ
- Güzelyalı, Manavgat
- Güzelyalı, Pendik
- Güzelyalı, Atakum
