= Atakum =

- District and municipality
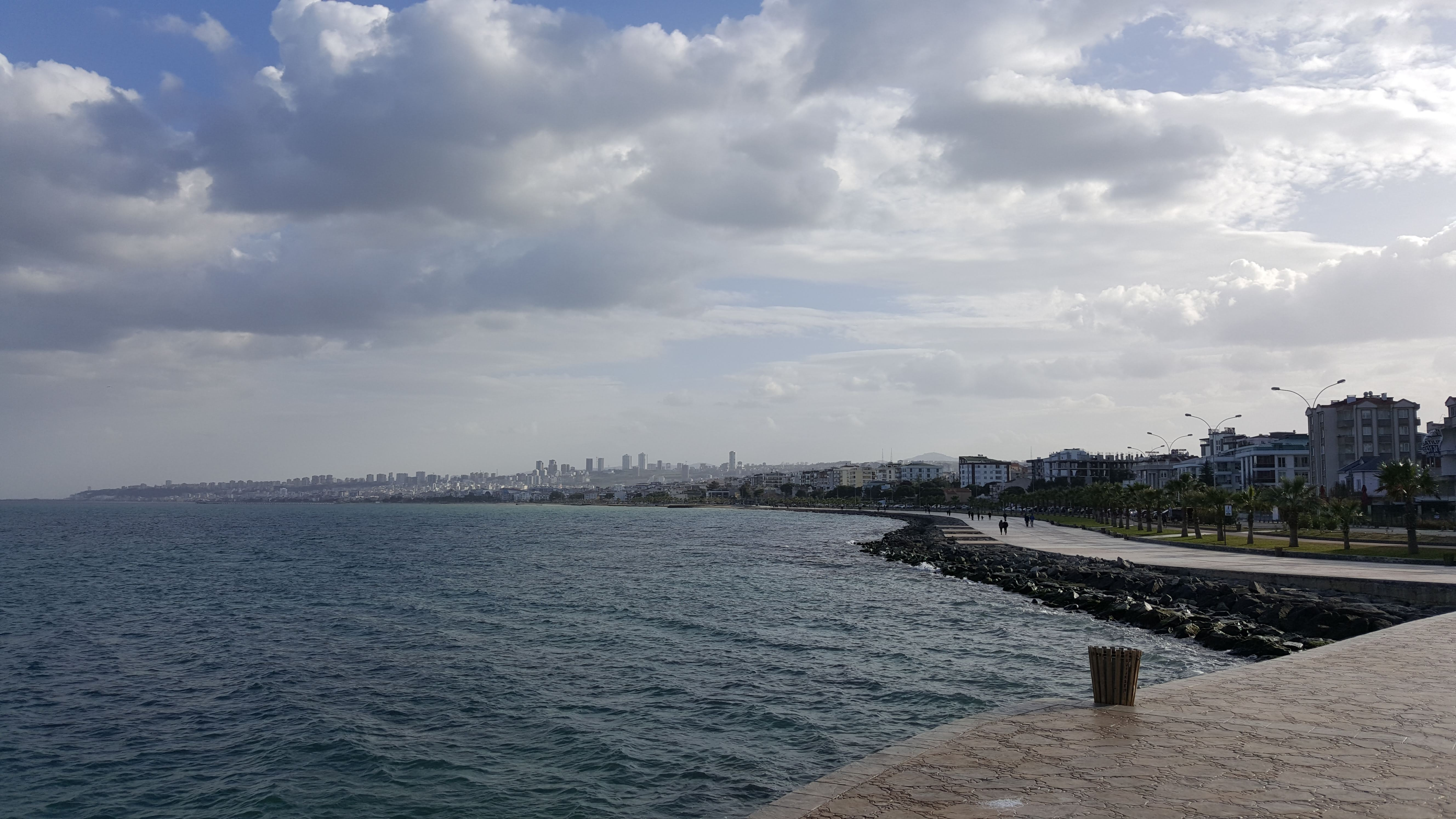
- Atakum as seen from the seafront

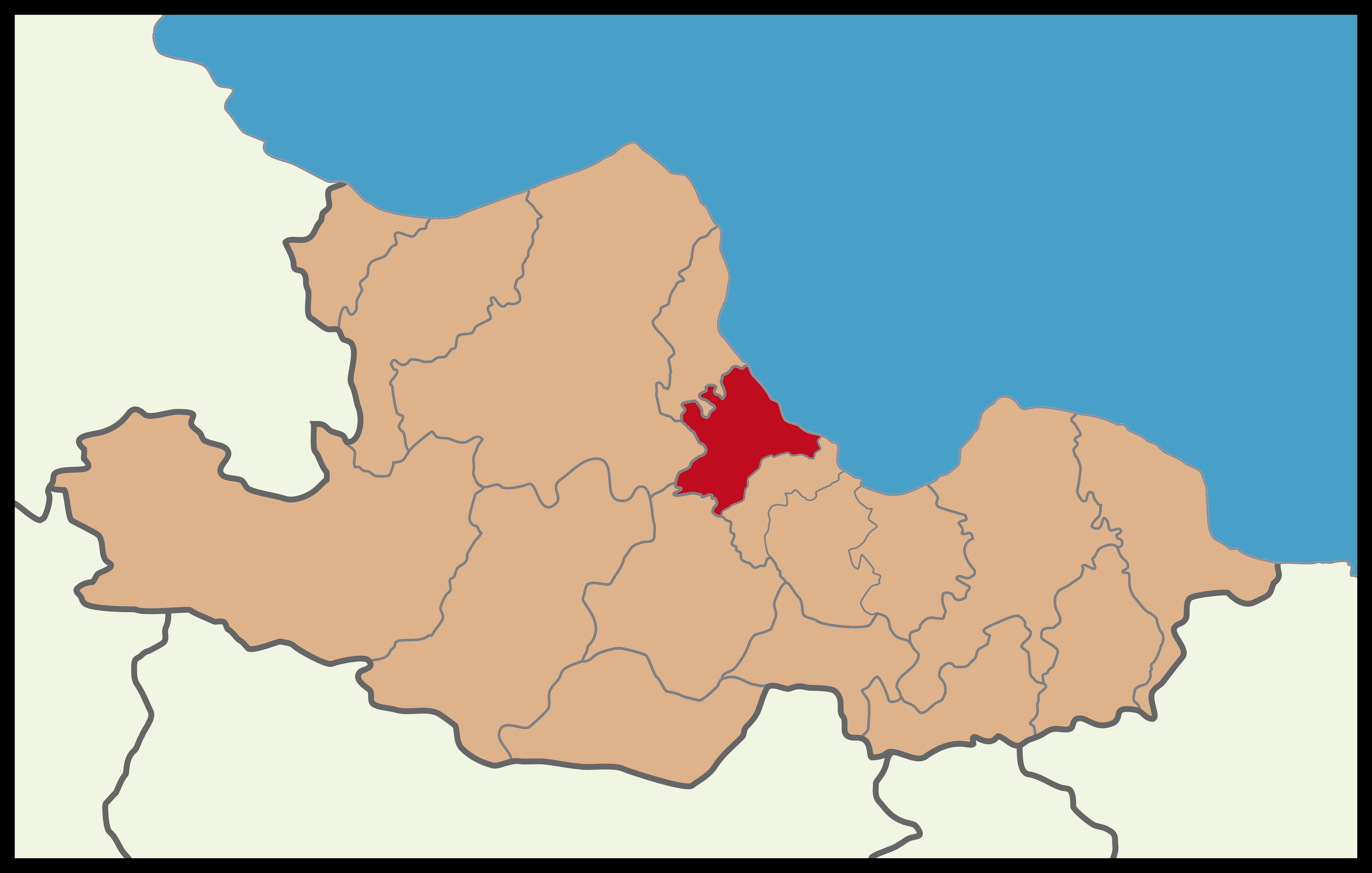
- Map showing Atakum District in Samsun Province

- Location within Turkey
- Coordinates: 41°19′42″N 36°17′06″E
- Country: Turkey
- Province: Samsun

Government
  - Mayor: Serhat Türkel (CHP)
- Area: 351 km^{2} (136 sq mi)
- Elevation: 4 m (13 ft)
- Population (2022): 242,171
  - Density: 690/km^{2} (1,790/sq mi)
- Time zone: UTC+3 (TRT)
- Postal code: 55200
- Area code: 0362
- Climate: Cfa
- Website: atakum.bel.tr

Atakum is a municipality and district of Samsun Province, Turkey. Its area is 351 km^{2}, and its population is 242,171 (2022). Atakum is a largely middle class suburban district located to the west of the primary city of Samsun and further suburban Ondokuzmayıs. The city's population expanded rapidly beginning in the 1990s and continues to grow at a healthy pace. The city consists largely of middle class housing blocks with ground floor retail and a mix of office uses. In 2009, the city undertook a significant waterfront redevelopment campaign which entailed the construction of a beachfront and pedestrian promenade. Construction of the waterfront promenade and Tram was led by former Samsun Province governor Yusuf Ziya Yılmaz. The city is served by the Samsun Tram which runs down the median of İsmet İnönü Caddesi.

Ondokuz Mayıs University is located on the western edge of the city and is serviced by the University Station on the Samsun Tram. Atakum's mayor is Serhat Türkel of the Republican People's Party.

== History ==
Before the Turkish War of Independence Atakum was known by the Greek name of Matasyon. The land that encompasses Atakum was once used for growing tobacco, tea, corn, rice, beans, strawberries and nuts. The land located between the hills to the south and the Black Sea shore was an attractive place to farm and live. After the Turkish War of Independence the land became a popular place for residents of adjacent Samsun to take their summer holiday's. With the establishment of Ondokuz Mayıs University and the construction of State road D.010 (Turkey), the agricultural lands were rapidly developed with stores and apartment blocks. As a result of the rapid population growth between 1975 and 1994, Atakum Municipality was established. In 2008 the district Atakum was created from part of the former central district of Samsun. At the 2013 Turkish local government reorganisation, the rural part of the district was integrated into the municipality, the villages becoming neighbourhoods.

Atakum has continued to grow rapidly. The district's population grew from 107,953 in 2008 to 242,171 in 2022. Little farmland remains within the limits of the urbanized portions of Atakum. The core neighborhoods of the municipality are now largely mid-rise apartment buildings with ground floor retail.

Metin Burma served as the first mayor of the newly formed Atakum Municipality. He served as mayor two terms. Between 2004 and 2013, Adem Bektaş served the role as Atakum's second mayor. Cemil Deveci now serves in the role of Mayor. He is a member of the Republican People's Party. Samsun Province is led by Mustafa Demir from the Justice and Development Party.

Historical population of Atakam district
Year	Pop.	±% p.a.
2008	107,953	—
2012	139,730	+6.66%
2017	192,953	+6.67%
2022	242,171	+4.65%
Source: TÜIK (2008-2022)

== Orientation ==
Atakum is located 5 km to the west of Samsun City Center. The urbanized portion of the municipality is located on a plane located between the hills to the south and the Black Sea. The south and the west of Atakum District are defined by hills and forests. The urbanized portion of Atakum follows a traditional street grid pattern. Recep Tayyip Erdoğan Bulvar is the primary north–south corridor in Atakum, Abdullah Gul Bulvar, İsmet İnönü Bulvar and Atatürk Bulvar also known as Ataturk Boulevard are the primary east–west corridors. The Samsun Tram runs down the median of İsmet İnönü Bulvar. Atakum's seafront promenade which runs adjacent to the Black Sea is known as Adnan Menderes Bulvar. The promenade is home to over one hundred bars, restaurants and hotels. It is a popular regional destination particularly in Summer.

Samsun Province's attractive weather and growing economy have benefitted Atakum. The municipality recorded the highest population growth rate in Samsun Province. Most retail establishments in Atakum are located along Atatürk Bulvar and Recep Tayyip Erdoğan Bulvar. The city is home to two large shopping centers - CityMall Avm and Yeşilyurt Avm. Atakum has Atakum Olympic Swimming Pool and Ondokuz Mayıs University Olympic Swimming Pool, and a municipal bowling alley. Many students reside in Atakum due to its proximity to Ondokuz Mayıs University.

Ataturk Boulevard runs through the center of Atakum connecting it to Samsun City Center, Bafra and Sinop, Turkey. Atakum has been given the status of district, and local government structuring has been made with the surrounding municipalities and towns. Atakum is served by Samsun-Çarşamba Airport as small international airport that services Samsun Province. Regional buses arrive at Samsun Şehirlerarası Otobüs Terminal to the south of Samsun. VM Medical Park Samsun Hospital and Ondokuz Mayıs University Hospital are the largest medical institutions in the District.

Coastal parts of the district are susceptible to earthquakes.

== Composition ==
There are 56 neighbourhoods in Atakum District:

- Akalan
- Aksu
- Alanlı
- Aslandamı
- Atatepe
- Ayvalı
- Balaç
- Beypınarı
- Büyükkolpınar
- Büyükoyumca
- Çakırlar
- Çakırlaryalı
- Çamlıyazı
- Çatalçam Güzelyurt
- Çatmaoluk
- Çobanlı
- Çobanözü
- Cumhuriyet
- Denizevleri
- Elmaçukuru
- Erikli
- Esenevler
- Güneyköy
- Güzelyalı
- İncesu
- İncesu Yalı
- İstiklal
- Kabadüz
- Kamalı
- Karakavuk
- Karaoyumca
- Kasnakçımermer
- Kayagüney
- Kesilli
- Köseli
- Küçükkolpınar
- Kulacadağ
- Kurugökçe
- Kurupelit Körfez
- Mevlana
- Meyvalı
- Mimarsinan
- Özören
- Sarayköy
- Sarıışık
- Sarıtaş
- Sarıyusuf
- Şenyurt
- Taflan Cami
- Taflan Merkez Orta
- Taflan Yalı
- Yenimahalle
- Yeşildere
- Yeşiltepe
- Yeşilyurt
- Yukarıaksu

== Notable people ==
- Anton Pasha, guerrilla and armed leader

== Gallery ==
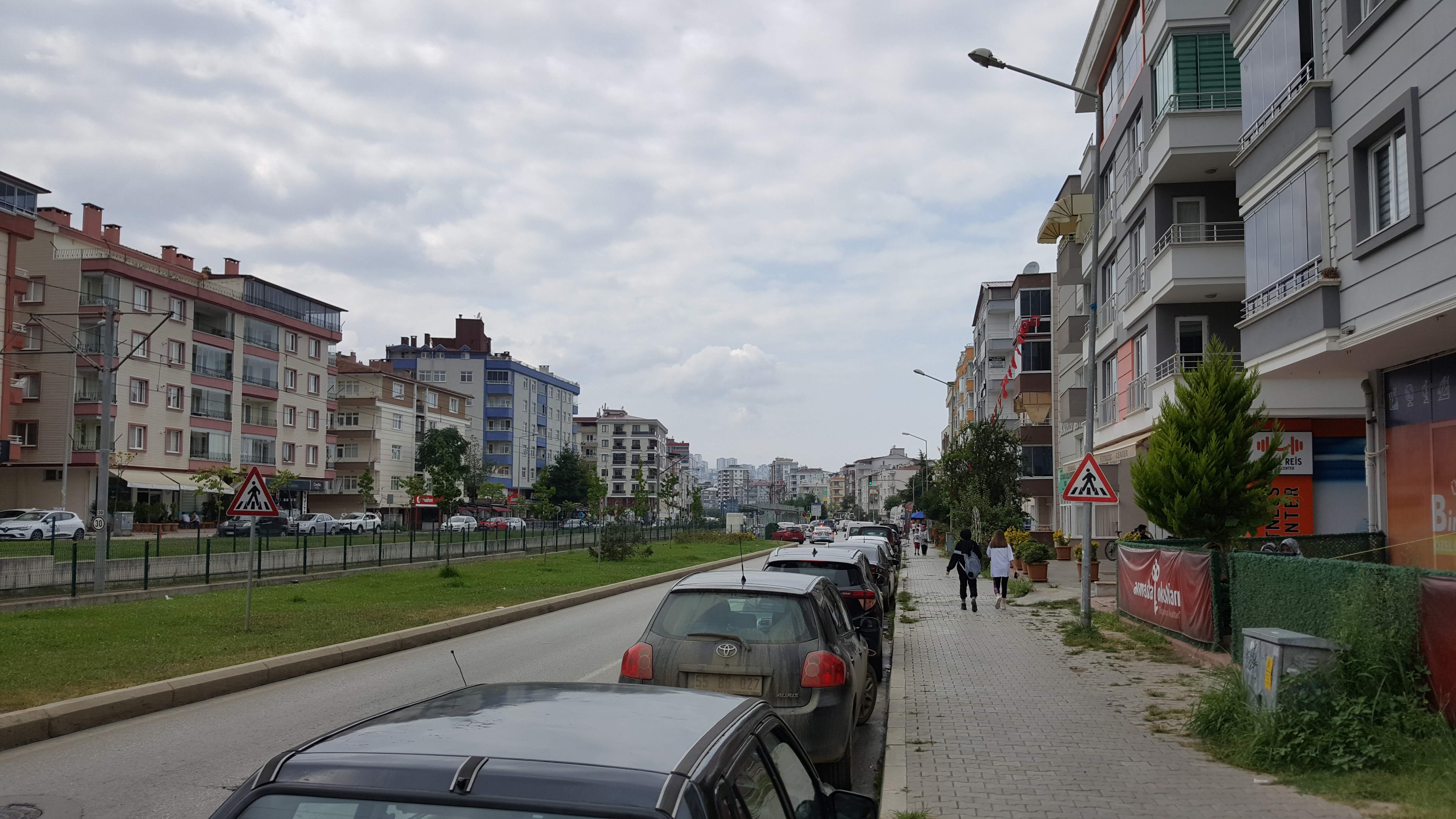
İsmet İnönü Caddesi in Atakum

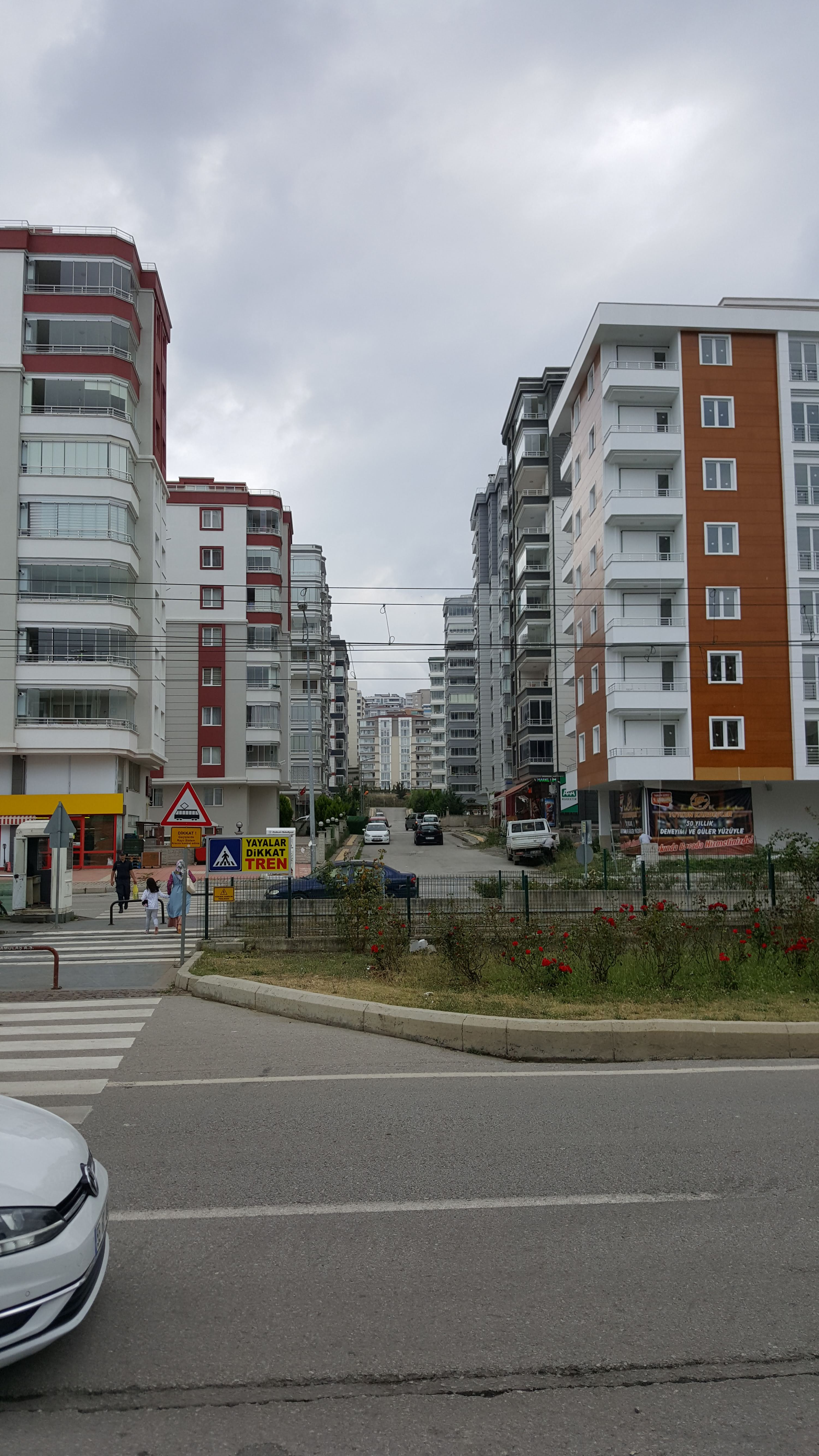
A typical street in Yenimahalle, Atakum

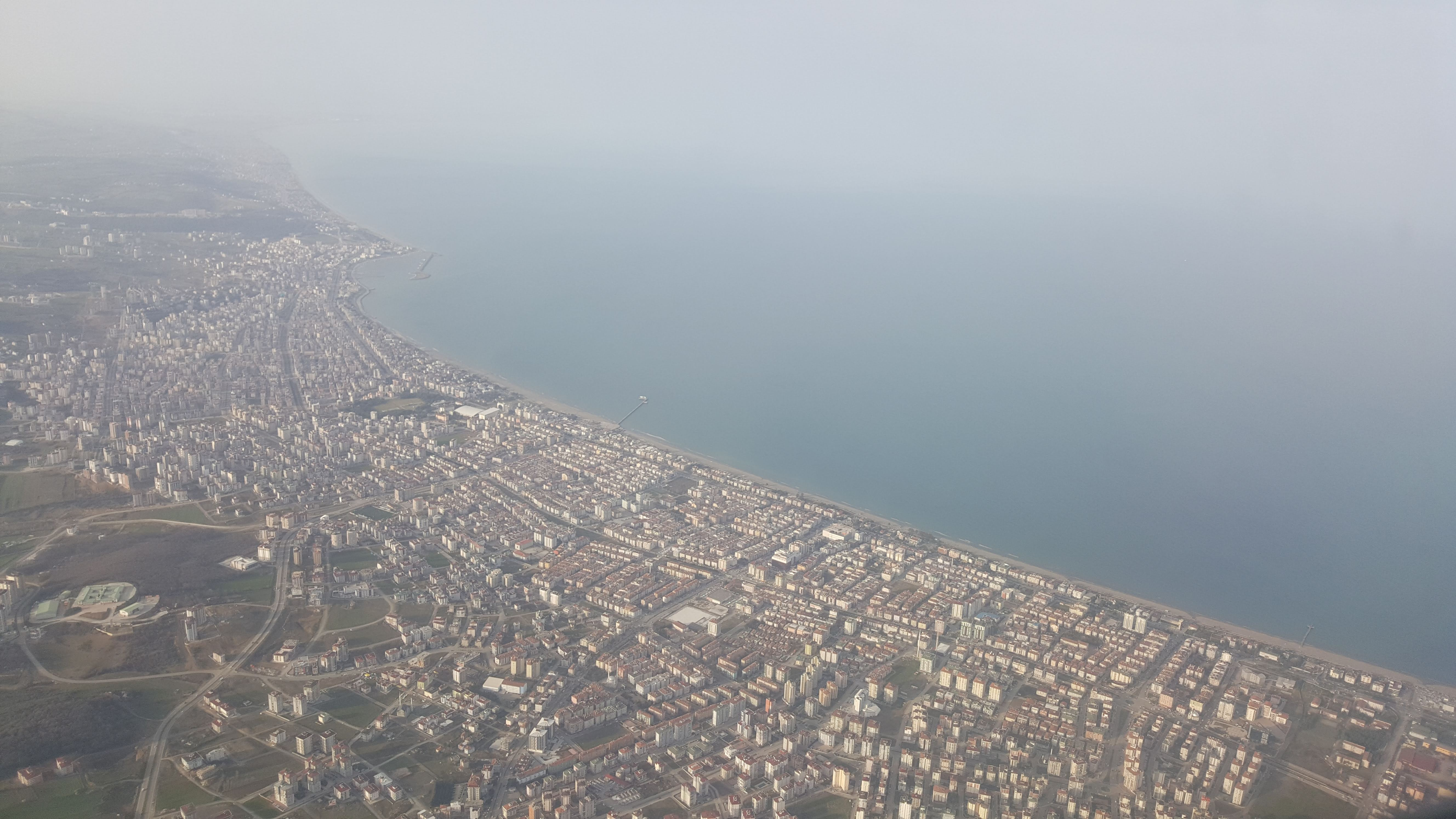
An aerial image of Atakum

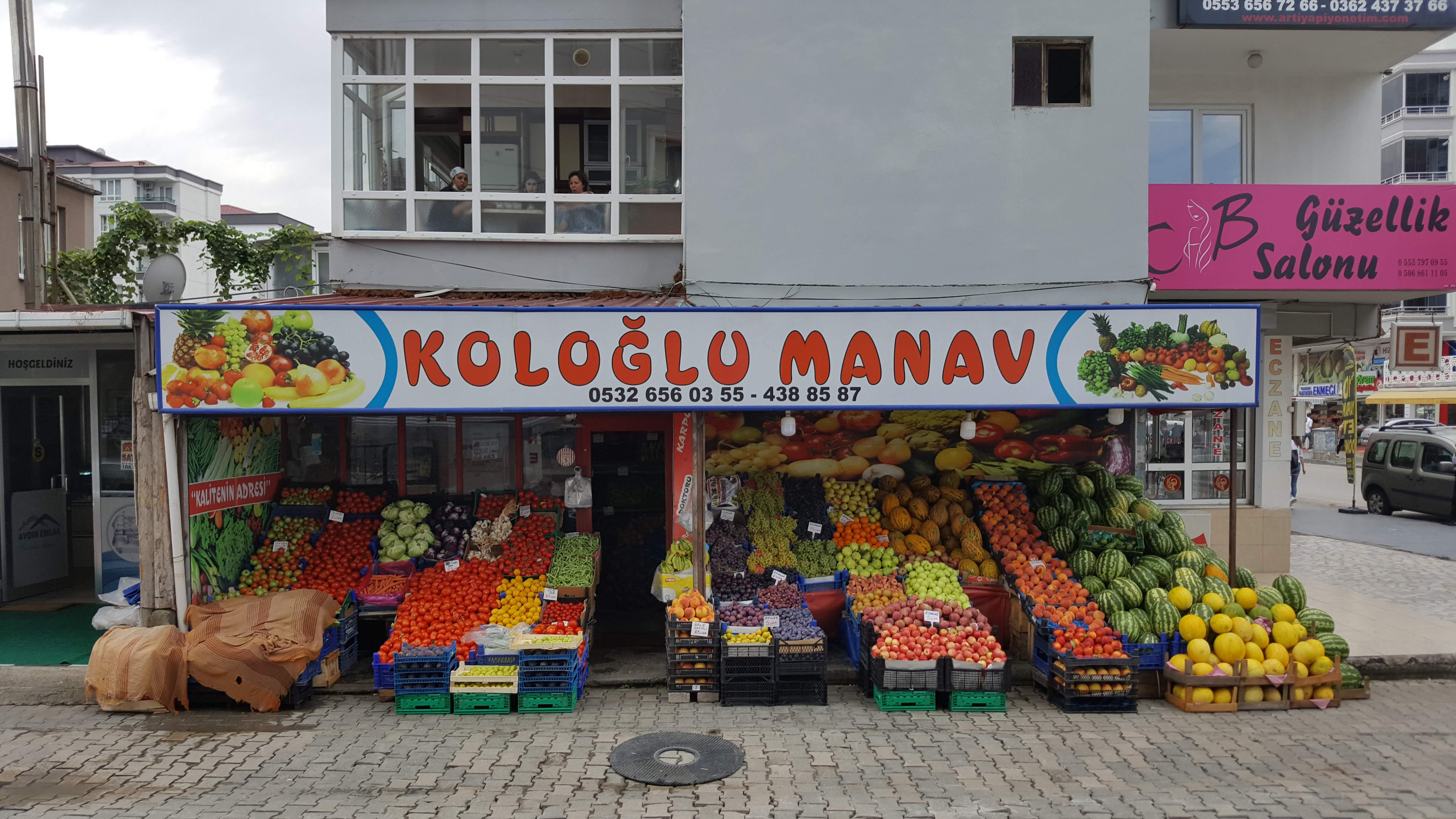
A Manav in Atakum

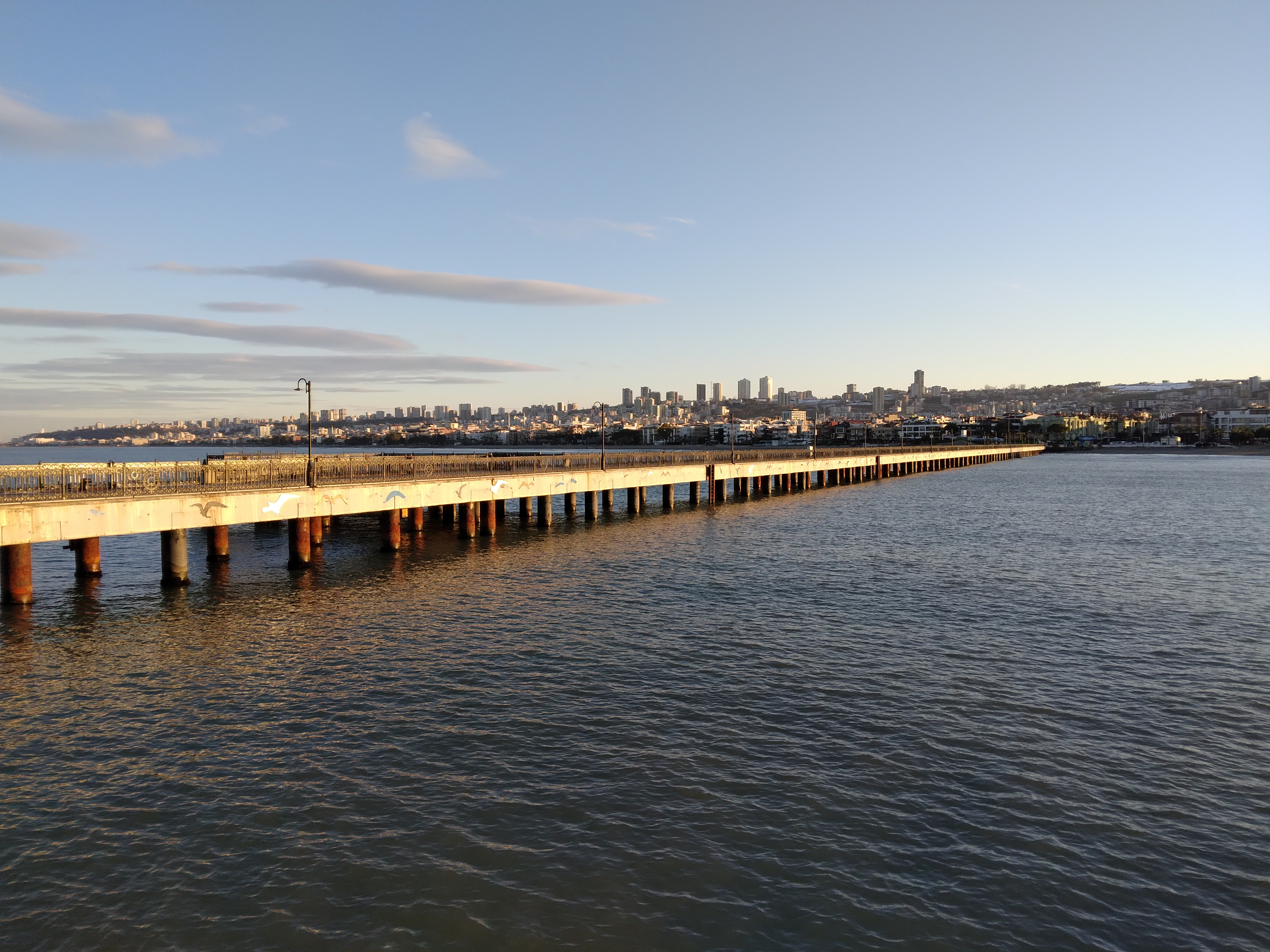
Atakum as seen from Çobanlı İskelesi
