= Kemalpaşa District, Artvin =

District of Artvin Province, Turkey

Kemalpaşa District
- District
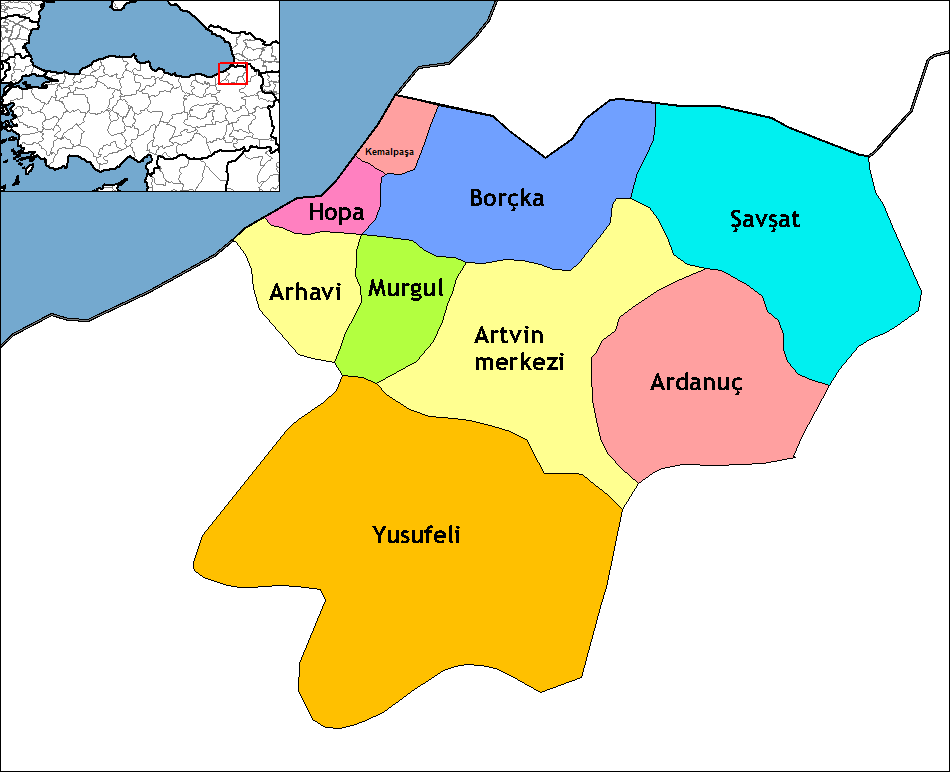
- Map showing Kemalpaşa District in Artvin Province

- Location in Turkey
- Coordinates: 41°29′N 41°32′E
- Country: Turkey
- Province: Artvin
- Seat: Kemalpaşa

Government
  - Kaymakam: Mesut Coşkun
- Area: 74 km^{2} (29 sq mi)
- Population (2021): 8,974
  - Density: 120/km^{2} (310/sq mi)
- Time zone: UTC+3 (TRT)
- Website: www.artvinkemalpasa.gov.tr

Kemalpaşa District is a district of Artvin Province of Turkey. Its seat is the town Kemalpaşa. Its area is 74 km^{2}, and its population is 8,974 (2021). The district was established in 2017. It lies on the Black Sea coast and has a border crossing with Georgia at Sarp/Sarpi.

== Composition ==
There is one municipality in Kemalpaşa District:

- Kemalpaşa

There are 12 villages in Kemalpaşa District:

- Akdere
- Çamurlu
- Dereiçi
- Gümüşdere
- Karaosmaniye
- Kayaköy
- Kazimiye
- Köprücü
- Liman
- Osmaniye
- Sarp
- Üçkardeş
