= Ağıllar, Bafra =

Ağıllar
- Neighbourhood
- Location in Turkey
- Coordinates: 41.5908°N 35.9135°E
- Country: Turkey
- Province: Samsun
- District: Bafra
- Population (2022): 296
- Time zone: UTC+3 (TRT)

Ağıllar is a neighbourhood in the municipality and district of Bafra, Samsun Province, Turkey. Its population is 296 (2022). It is 5 kilometers away from Bafra and 55 kilometers to Samsun.
