= Kayaköy, Kemalpaşa =

Kayaköy Shana
- Village
- Location within Turkey
- Coordinates: 41.5010°N 41.5684°E
- Country: Turkey
- Province: Artvin
- District: Kemalpaşa
- Elevation: 343 m (1,125 ft)
- Population (2021): 464
- Time zone: UTC+3 (TRT)

Kayaköy (also: Kaya) is a village in the Kemalpaşa District, Artvin Province, Turkey. Its population is 464 (2021).

== History ==
According to list of villages in Laz language book (2009), name of the village is Shana, which means "dowery" in Laz and Mingrelian language. Most villagers are ethnically Hemshin.
