= Çamurlu, Kemalpaşa =

Çamurlu
- Village
- Location within Turkey
- Coordinates: 41.4888°N 41.5709°E
- Country: Turkey
- Province: Artvin
- District: Kemalpaşa
- Population (2021): 330
- Time zone: UTC+3 (TRT)

Çamurlu (Laz language: Chanchaxuna) is a village in the Kemalpaşa District, Artvin Province, Turkey. Its population is 330 (2021).
