= Derepazarı District =

District of Rize Province, Turkey

- District
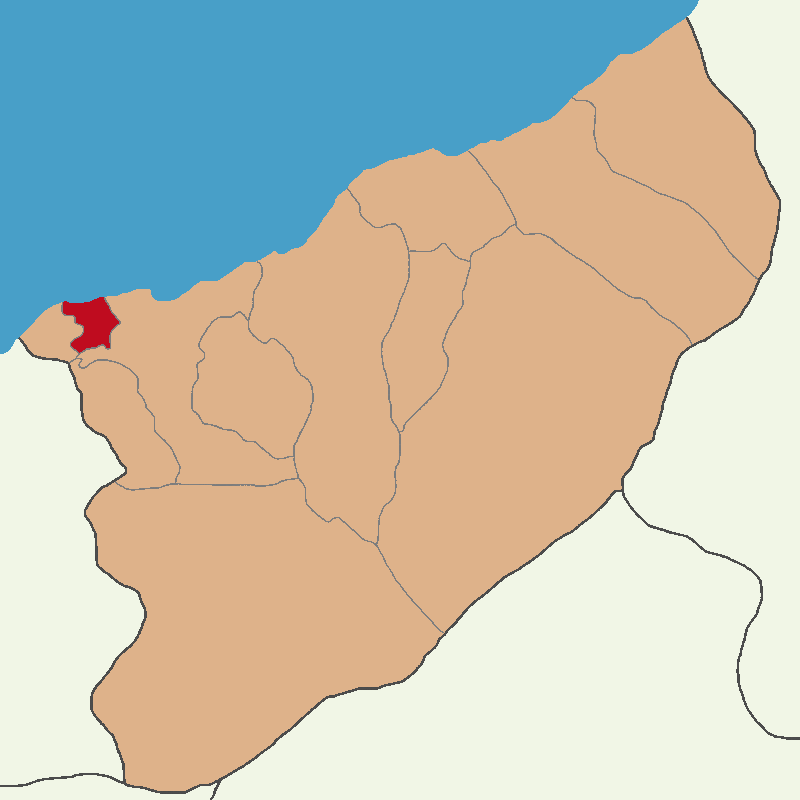
- Map showing Derepazarı District in Rize Province

- Location in Turkey
- Coordinates: 41°01′N 40°26′E
- Country: Turkey
- Province: Rize
- Seat: Derepazarı

Government
  - Kaymakam: Bekir Yalçın
- Area: 28 km^{2} (11 sq mi)
- Population (2021): 7,057
  - Density: 250/km^{2} (650/sq mi)
- Time zone: UTC+3 (TRT)
- Website: www.derepazari.gov.tr

Derepazarı District is a district of the Rize Province of Turkey. Its seat is the town of Derepazarı. Its area is 28 km^{2}, and its population is 7,057 (2021).

== Composition ==
There is one municipality in Derepazarı District:

- Derepazarı

There are 10 villages in Derepazarı District:

- Bahattinpaşa
- Bürücek
- Çakmakçılar
- Çeşmeköy
- Çukurlu
- Esentepe
- Kirazdağı
- Maltepe
- Sandıktaş
- Uzunkaya
