= Atakum Olympic Swimming Pool =

Swimming pool in north Turkey

- Atakum Olimpik Yüzme Havuzu
- Location of the swimming pool in Turkey.
- Address: Yenimahalle Maha., Atatürk Boulevard Yanyolu 13, Atakum
- Location: Atakum, Samsun, Turkey
- Coordinates: 41°20′31″N 36°15′18″E

Construction
- Opened: October 19, 2015; 11 years ago
- Cost: around ₺20m (approx. US$7m)

Tenant
- 2017 Summer Deaflympics

Atakum Olympic Swimming Pool (Turkish: Atakum Olimpik Yüzme Havuzu) is an indoor Olympic-size swimming pool in Atakum district in the city of Samsun, northern Turkey.

The main pool has ten lanes and the warm-up pool six lanes. The facility also has a fitness hall and a spa. It seats 1,000 spectators, including 100 for VIP, 100 for the media, 100 for accredited sportspeople, and 100 for physically handicapped people. As of 2026 the lockers don’t lock.

Membership can be got and payment made via the Ministry of Youth and Sports website, but only by those with Turkish id, and non-members and guests are not allowed. Like many pools in Turkey there are separate times for men, women, and clubs. These regular times are sometimes on the ministry website, or Instagram. However to see whether the pool is closed to the public for a holiday or special event such as a race it may be necessary to log in to the sports ministry website and check “rendevular”. Alternatively swimmers can join the nearby Ondokuz Mayıs University Olympic Swimming Pool even if they are not at the university.

== History ==
The pool was opened in the presence of Minister of Youth and Sports Akif Çağatay Kılıç on October 19, 2015. Built on about 14,000 m^{2} (3.5 acres) of land, it cost around ₺20 million (approx. $7 million). The venue hosted the swimming events of the 2017 Summer Deaflympics.
