= Makriali Church =

Former orthodox church in Kemalpaşa, Artvin Province, Turkey

- მაკრიალის ეკლესია
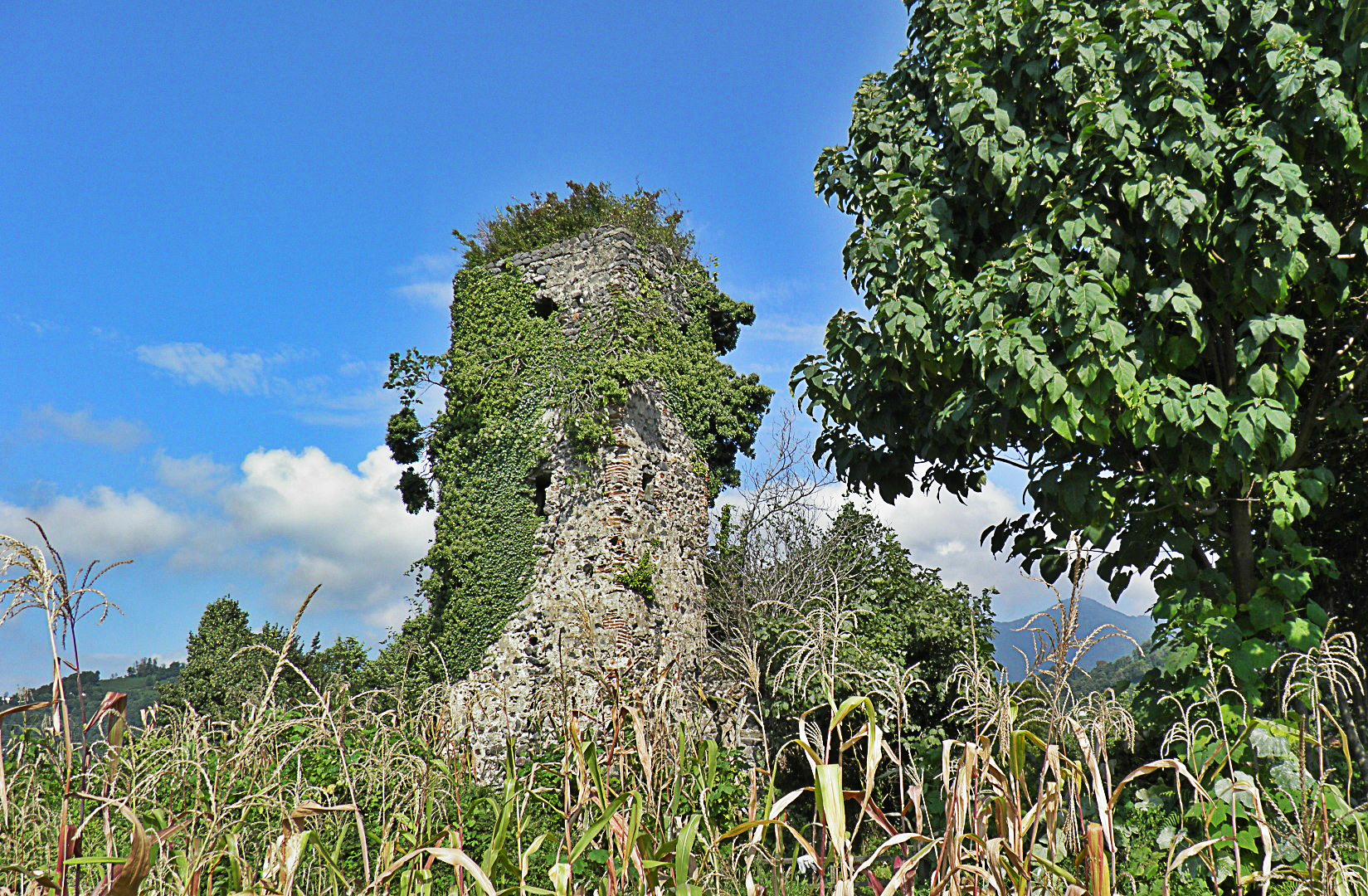

- Location within Turkey

Religion
- Affiliation: Georgian Orthodox Church
- Status: Not functioning

Location
- Location: Artvin Province, Turkey
- Interactive map of Makriali Church

The Makriali Church (Georgian: მაკრიალის ეკლესია) was an Orthodox Church located in Kemalpaşa, Hopa, Artvin Province of Turkey, on the border with Georgia. A royal wedding took place in the church in June 1367 between King Bagrat V of Georgia and Anna of Trebizond. Baedeker's Russia for 1914 mentions the interesting ruins of the old church of Makriali and a traveler of 1969 mentions "a deserted church on the open and low-lying ground to the left of the road... a little way to the north of and 4km from the present Soviet-Turkish border at Sarp..."
