= State road D.010 (Turkey) =

Road in Turkey

D.010

Route information
- Part of E70 / E97 / AH5
- Length: 1,427 km (887 mi)

Major junctions
- West end: D.014 Karasu, Sakarya Province

- East end: D.060 Akçakale, Kars Province

Location
- Country: Turkey

Highway system
- Highways in Turkey; Motorways; List; State Highways; List

D.010, aka Black Sea Coastal Road, is a major west-east state road in northern Turkey that serves the Black Sea coast. The 1,427 km (887 mi) route starts in the west at the intersection D.014, 5 km (3.1 mi) southeast of Karasu, Sakarya Province, and terminates at the intersection D.060, 25 km (16 mi) northeast of Kars in eastern Anatolia. However, it is discontinued between Zonguldak and 10 km (6.2 mi) southwest of Çaycuma. The gap of 37 km (23 mi) is on the highway D.750.

Connecting most of the coastal towns and cities at middle and eastern Black Sea, the D.010 runs through Ereğli, Zonguldak, Bartın, Sinop, Samsun, Ordu, Giresun, Trabzon and Rize. It leaves the coast at Hopa, Artvin Province and turns southeast. D.010 passes through Ardahan and connects at Akçakale, Kars Province to D.060, which leads in the east to the Turkey-Armenia border checkpoint at Akyaka, Kars. Across its length, it passes through 14 provinces of Turkey.

Between Samsun and Hopa, D.010 is a divided route named Black Sea Coastal Highway (Turkish: Karadeniz Sahil Yolu), and a 480 km (300 mi) section forms part of the European route E70.

== Itinerary ==
In the table below the locations between Karasu and Sarp are shown.

Province	City/Town	Distance from previous location	Distance from West end	Distance from East end
Sakarya	Intersection D.014; Karasu	0	0	1,427
Düzce	Akçakoca	31	31	1,396
Zonguldak	Alaplı	27	58	1,369
Zonguldak	Ereğli	12	70	1,357
Zonguldak	Kozlu	41	111	1,316
Zonguldak	Zonguldak	5	116	1,311
Zonguldak	Intersection D.750; Zonguldak	0	116	1,311
Zonguldak	Intersection D.750; Bakacakadı	0	116	1,311
Zonguldak	Çaycuma	10	126	1,301
Bartın	Bartın	41	167	1,260
Bartın	Amasra	17	184	1,243
Bartın	Kurucaşile	45	229	1,198
Kastamonu	Cide	28	257	1,170
Kastamonu	Doğanyurt	69	326	1,101
Kastamonu	İnebolu	32	358	1,069
Kastamonu	Abana	22	380	1,047
Kastamonu	Çatalzeytin	22	402	1,025
Sinop	Türkeli	10	412	1,015
Sinop	Ayancık	30	442	985
Sinop	Sinop	59	501	926
Sinop	Gerze	33	534	893
Samsun	Yakakent	44	578	849
Samsun	Bafra	31	609	818
Samsun	Samsun	50	659	768
Samsun	Çarşamba	39	698	729
Samsun	Terme	21	719	708
Ordu	Ünye	30	749	678
Ordu	Fatsa	22	771	656
Ordu	Ordu	41	812	615
Ordu	Gülyalı	14	826	601
Giresun	Piraziz	5	831	596
Giresun	Bulancak	15	846	581
Giresun	Giresun	21	867	560
Giresun	Keşap	7	874	553
Giresun	Espiye	20	894	533
Giresun	Tirebolu	12	906	521
Giresun	Görele	16	922	505
Giresun	Eynesil	13	935	492
Trabzon	Beşikdüzü	4	939	488
Trabzon	Vakfıkebir	4	943	484
Trabzon	Çarşıbaşı	9	952	475
Trabzon	Akçaabat	22	974	453
Trabzon	Trabzon	8	982	445
Trabzon	Yomra	5	987	440
Trabzon	Arsin	6	993	434
Trabzon	Araklı	12	1,005	422
Trabzon	Sürmene	7	1,012	415
Trabzon	Of	14	1,026	401
Rize	İyidere	8	1,034	393
Rize	Derepazarı	6	1,040	387
Rize	Rize	13	1,053	374
Rize	Çayeli	19	1,072	355
Rize	Pazar	15	1,087	340
Rize	Ardeşen	9	1,096	331
Artvin	Fındıklı	16	1,112	315
Artvin	Arhavi	16	1,128	299
Artvin	Hopa	11	1,139	288
Artvin	Borçka	36	1,175	252
Artvin	Şavşat	95	1,270	157
Ardahan	Ardahan	49	1,319	108
Ardahan	Çıldır	44	1,363	64
Kars	Arpaçay	53	1,416	11
Kars	Intersection D.060; Akçakale	11	1,427	0
1.000 mi = 1.609 km; 1.000 km = 0.621 mi

== Intersections ==
- D.014 at east of Karasu
- D.655 at Akçakoca
- D.750 at Zonguldak
- D.750 at Bakacakadı, Zonguldak
- D.755 at Bartın
- D.759 at Cide
- D.765 at İnebolu
- D.785 between Sinop and Gerze
- D.795 / E95 at Samsun
- D.850 at Ünye
- D.865 at Keşap
- D.877 between Tirebolu and Görele
- D.885 / E97 at Trabzon
- D.925 between Of and İyidere
- D.950 at Artvin
- D.955 at Ardahan
- D.965 / E691 at Ölçek, Kars
- D.060 at Akçakale, Kars

== See also ==
- Selimiye Tunnel between Hopa and Kemalpaşa in Artvin Province.
