= Akdere, Kemalpaşa =

Akdere Zendidi
- Village
- Location within Turkey
- Coordinates: 41.4579°N 41.5142°E
- Country: Turkey
- Province: Artvin
- District: Kemalpaşa
- Population (2021): 126
- Time zone: UTC+3 (TRT)

Akdere (Laz language: Zendidi) is a village in the Kemalpaşa District, Artvin Province, Turkey. Its population is 126 (2021).
