= Liman, Kemalpaşa =

Liman
- Village
- Location within Turkey
- Coordinates: 41.4670°N 41.4924°E
- Country: Turkey
- Province: Artvin
- District: Kemalpaşa
- Population (2021): 173
- Time zone: UTC+3 (TRT)

Liman is a village in the Kemalpaşa District, Artvin Province, Turkey. Its population is 173 (2021). Most villagers are ethnically Laz.
