= Gümüşdere, Kemalpaşa =

Gümüşdere Xeluket
- Village
- Location within Turkey
- Coordinates: 41.4566°N 41.5046°E
- Country: Turkey
- Province: Artvin
- District: Kemalpaşa
- Population (2021): 227
- Time zone: UTC+3 (TRT)

Gümüşdere (Homshetsi dialect: Xeluket) is a village in the Kemalpaşa District, Artvin Province, Turkey. Its population is 227 (2021).
