= Bafra =

- District and municipality
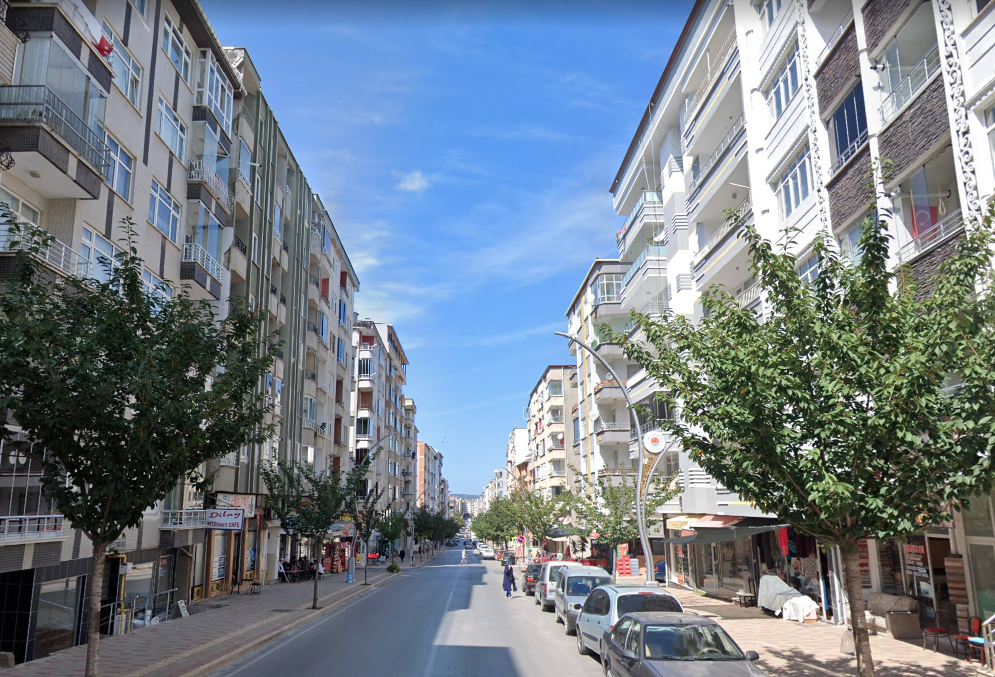
- Atatürk Bulvar in Bafra

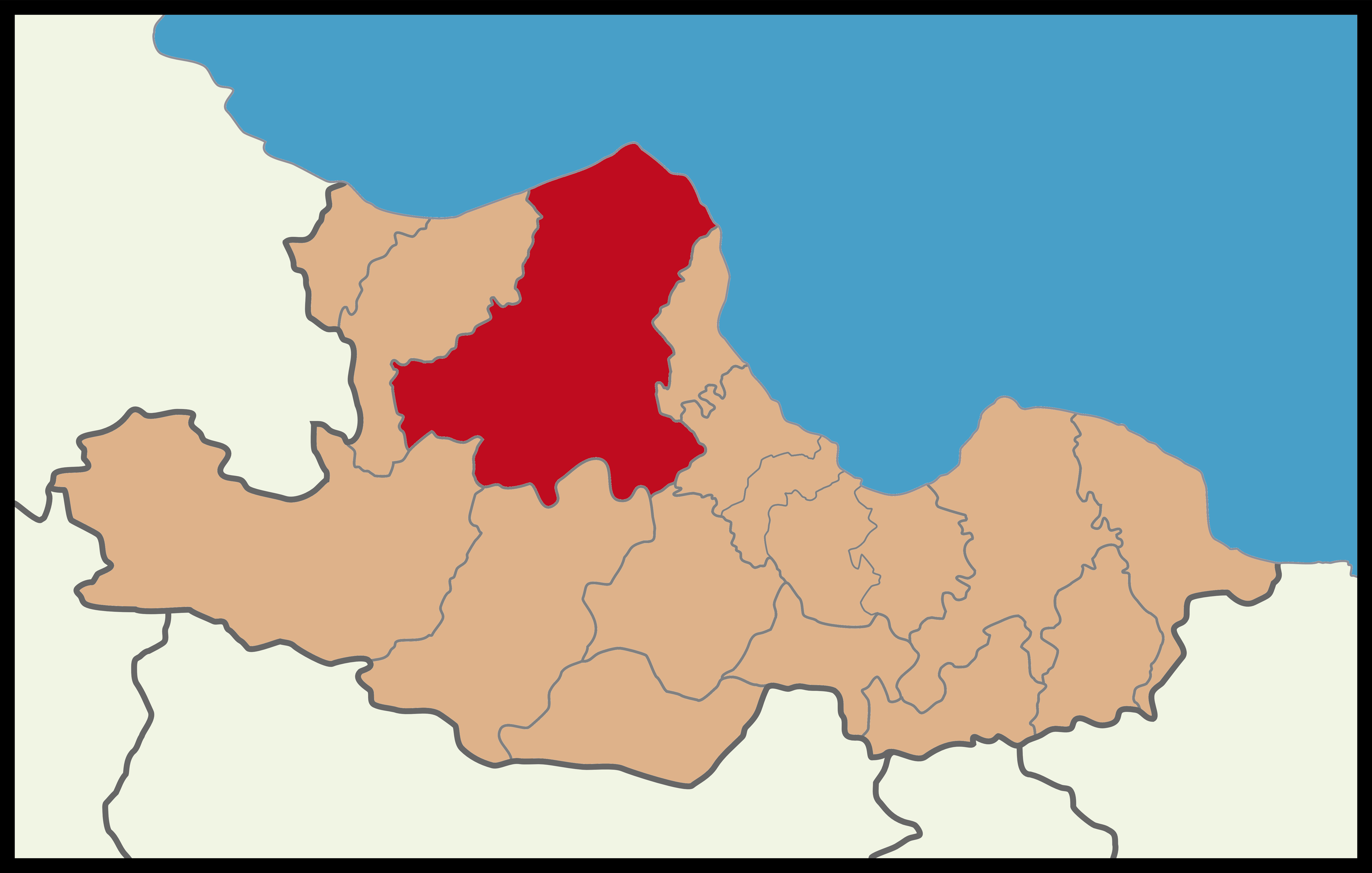
- Map showing Bafra District in Samsun Province

- Location within Turkey
- Coordinates: 41°34′20″N 35°54′53″E
- Country: Turkey
- Province: Samsun

Government
  - Mayor: Hamit Kılıç (AKP)
- Area: 1,503 km^{2} (580 sq mi)
- Population (2023): 143,109
  - Density: 95.22/km^{2} (246.6/sq mi)
- Time zone: UTC+3 (TRT)
- Postal code: 55400
- Area code: 0362
- Climate: Csa
- Website: www.bafra.bel.tr

Bafra is a municipality and district of Samsun Province, Turkey. Covering about 1,500 km^{2}, and with over 140,000 inhabitants it is a settlement located 20 kilometres (12 mi) from the Black Sea, in the fertile Kızılırmak Delta. The Bafra Plain is famous in Turkey for its rich soil and high quality tobacco growing conditions. The city is well known in Turkey for its ice cream, cigarettes, tobacco and agricultural produce. The city is located 52 km northwest of Samsun and is connected by State road D.010.

== History ==
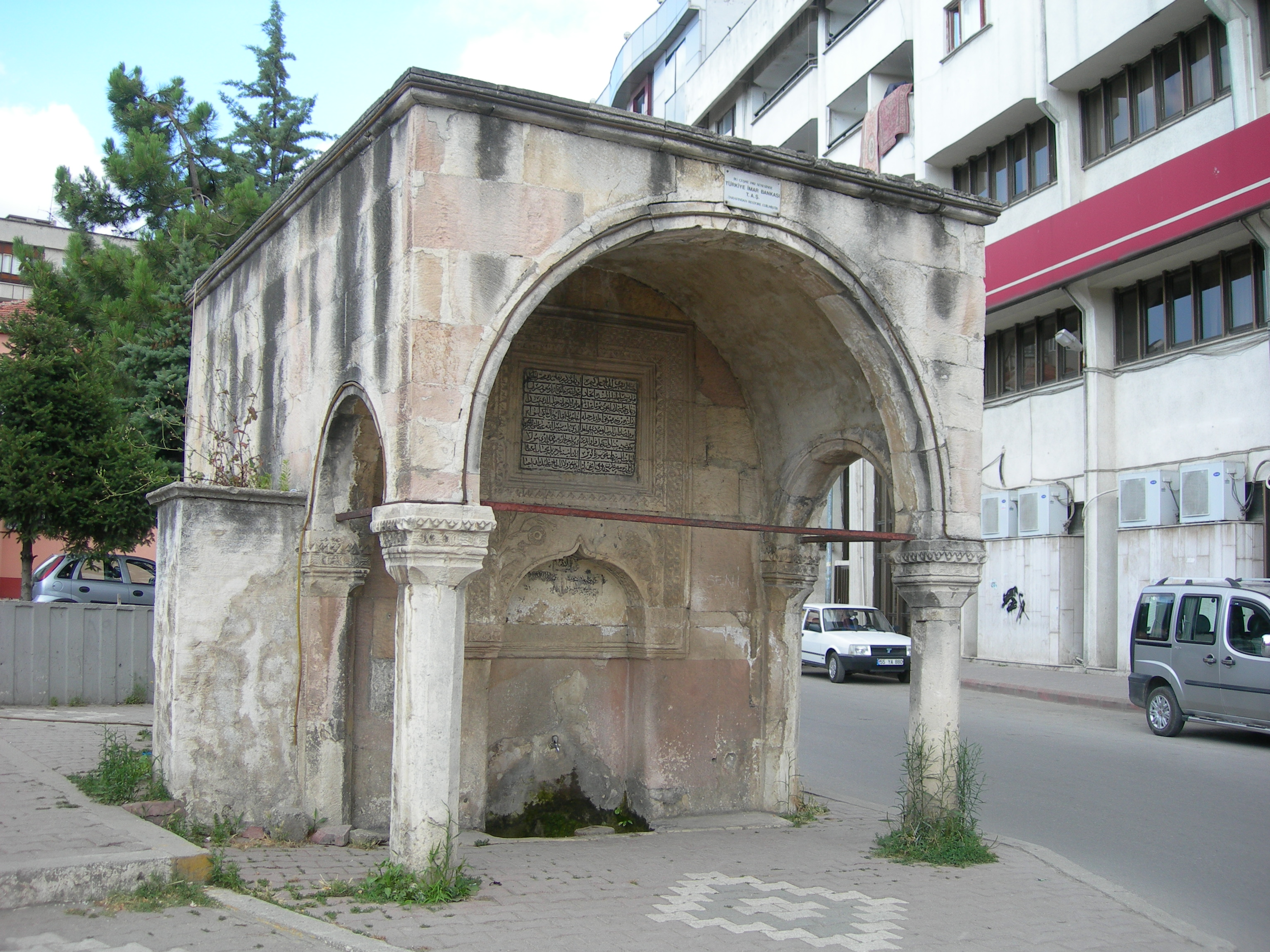
Alibey Fountain

The name of the municipality is thought to have come from the Phoenician name "bafira" or "bavra". Other beliefs about the etymology of the region come from the name "Ba-Hura" (Great River) given to Kizilirmak which generates the delta upon which the city is located. Historical records of human settlement in Bafra and the Kizilirmak delta date to as early as 5000 BC.

The region came under the rule of the Rome who renamed the area Gadilon and later Helega. After the Fall of the Western Roman Empire, the area became part of the Byzantine Empire. The region was a part of the Byzantine Empire until the Battle of Manzikert in 1071. After that battle, Bafra was captured by the Anatolian Seljuk Ruler Kaykaus I. After being conquered by the Seljuk Empire the region was repopulated by members of various Turkmen tribes. The invasion of the Mongol Empire began in 1243 and led to the collapse of Seljuk Empire and the establishment of scattered Turkish principalities. During this period, the Bafra Principality was briefly established. This political arrangement continued until 1460, when Bafra was again conquered and made part of the Ottoman Empire.

Under the Ottoman Empire, the town of Bafra was incorporated into Trabzon Province under the leadership of Canik Sanjak. The region flourished as an agricultural, fishing and shipping center under the Ottoman Empire. Prior to the Armenian Genocide, Bafra had an Armenian population of 2,200 with a St. Garabed Church and a school for boys and girls that had opened in 1873. The exact date of the establishment of the modern town is not known, though according to historical census records it appears in 1854.

The demographic landscape of Bafra was characterized by its multi-ethnic composition, though the Greek community formed the largest Christian minority. Alongside the Greeks, the district maintained a significant Armenian population, which Ottoman records estimated at 3,100 individuals in 1914 During the 1915 Armenian Genocide, the community in Bafra was largely targeted for deportation; reports from American missionaries in the region documented that Armenian residents were forced toward the interior, with their property subsequently confiscated by local authorities.

Furthermore, the district was home to a substantial Circassian (Çerkes) population, many of whom were descendants of refugees from the 19th-century Caucasian War. While the Circassians were Muslims, their social and political dynamics often intersected with the Christian minorities; historical accounts note that while some Circassian irregulars participated in the paramilitary campaigns of 1921, other local Muslim leaders occasionally provided limited refuge to Greek and Armenian civilians during the heights of the violence. By the early 1920s, the systematic targeting of the non-Muslim population had fundamentally altered the district's demographic structure, transitioning it into a more ethnically homogeneous region under the emerging Nationalist administration.

== Geography ==
Bafra is located in the western portion of Samsun Province. The city is 52 km northwest of Samsun City Center and neighboring Atakum. The town directly to the east of Bafra is Ondokuzmayıs, the northern edge of the city is bounded by the Black Sea, to the west is Alçam and to the south Kavak, Havza and Vezirköprü.

Bafra sits in the Bafra Plain which is set in the Kızılırmak delta. To the south of the city are the Küre Mountains. The highest of these nearby mountains is Mount Nebiyan with an elevation of 1224 m. The Küre Mountains are the extensions of the Canik Mountains. The Kızılırmak River is Bafra's largest and Turkey's longest river. The river reaches the plain by crossing these mountains through a deep valley. The Bafra Plain was formed entirely by the sediment from the Kızılırmak River. The length of Kızılırmak is 1151 km. It river originates from Kızıl Mountain in Sivas and draws a wide arc through Central Anatolia before meeting the Black Sea north of Bafra. The rainy season in the region is between April and July during which floods are a common occurrence.

== Subdivisions ==
There are 139 neighbourhoods in Bafra District:

- Adaköy
- Ağcaalan
- Ağıllar
- Akalan
- Aktekke
- Alaçam
- Alparslan
- Altınay
- Altınkaya
- Altınova
- Altınyaprak
- Asar
- Asmaçam
- Azay
- Bahçeler
- Bakırpınarı
- Balıklar
- Barış
- Başaran
- Başkaya
- Bengü
- Boğazkaya
- Burunca
- Büyükcami
- Çalköy
- Çamaltı
- Çatak
- Çataltepe
- Çetinkaya
- Çilhane
- Çulhakoca
- Cumhuriyet
- Darboğaz
- Dededağı
- Dedeli
- Derbent
- Dereler
- Dikencik
- Doğanca
- Doğankaya
- Düzköy
- Elalan
- Eldavut
- Elifli
- Emenli
- Emirefendi
- Esençay
- Evrenuşağı
- Eynegazi
- Fatih
- Fener
- Fevziçakmak
- Gazibeyli
- Gaziosmanpaşa
- Gazipaşa
- Gerzeliler
- Gökalan
- Gökçeağaç
- Gökçekent
- Gökçesu
- Göltepe
- Gümüşyaprak
- Hacınabi
- Hacıoğlu
- Harız
- Hıdırellez
- Hüseyinbeyli
- İğdir
- İkizpınar
- İkiztepe
- İlyaslı
- İnözükoşaca
- İshaklı
- İsmetpaşa
- Kahraman
- Kalaycılı
- Kamberli
- Kanlıgüney
- Kapıkaya
- Karaburç
- Karakütük
- Karıncak
- Karpuzlu
- Kavakpınar
- Kaygusuz
- Kelikler
- Kemalpaşa
- Keresteci
- Kızılırmak
- Kolay
- Komşupınar
- Koruluk
- Köseli
- Koşu
- Kozağzı
- Küçükkavakpınar
- Kuşçular
- Kuşluğan
- Kuzalan
- Lengerli
- Meşelitürkmenler
- Mevlana
- Müstecep
- Örencik
- Ortadurak
- Osmanbeyli
- Ozan
- Paşaşeyh
- Sahilkent
- Şahinkaya
- Sarıçevre
- Sarıkaya
- Sarıköy
- Sarpın
- Selemelik
- Şeyhören
- Şeyhulaş
- Şirinköy
- Sürmeli
- Tabakhane
- Taşköprü
- Tepebaşı
- Tepecik
- Terzili
- Türbe
- Türkköyü
- Tütüncüler
- Üçpınar
- Uluağaç
- Yağmurca
- Yaka
- Yakıntaş
- Yenialan
- Yeniköy
- Yeraltı
- Yeşilköy
- Yeşilyazı
- Yiğitalan
- Yörgüç

== Climate ==
Bafra experiences a hot-summer Mediterranean climate (Köppen: Csa), with very warm, moderately dry summers, and cool, rainy, sporadically snowy winters.

Climate data for Bafra (1991–2020)
Month	Jan	Feb	Mar	Apr	May	Jun	Jul	Aug	Sep	Oct	Nov	Dec	Year
Mean daily maximum °C (°F)	9.1 (48.4)	10.0 (50.0)	12.4 (54.3)	15.9 (60.6)	20.5 (68.9)	25.2 (77.4)	27.8 (82.0)	28.2 (82.8)	24.6 (76.3)	20.4 (68.7)	15.7 (60.3)	11.2 (52.2)	18.5 (65.3)
Daily mean °C (°F)	6.0 (42.8)	6.2 (43.2)	8.0 (46.4)	11.1 (52.0)	15.7 (60.3)	20.5 (68.9)	23.3 (73.9)	23.7 (74.7)	20.0 (68.0)	16.1 (61.0)	11.6 (52.9)	8.0 (46.4)	14.2 (57.6)
Mean daily minimum °C (°F)	3.6 (38.5)	3.3 (37.9)	4.7 (40.5)	7.6 (45.7)	12.0 (53.6)	16.4 (61.5)	19.1 (66.4)	19.8 (67.6)	16.3 (61.3)	12.8 (55.0)	8.6 (47.5)	5.6 (42.1)	10.9 (51.6)
Average precipitation mm (inches)	77.22 (3.04)	58.42 (2.30)	61.27 (2.41)	51.1 (2.01)	47.22 (1.86)	42.43 (1.67)	28.74 (1.13)	45.07 (1.77)	58.6 (2.31)	85.04 (3.35)	82.49 (3.25)	105.4 (4.15)	743.0 (29.25)
Average precipitation days (≥ 1.0 mm)	10.5	9.2	9.4	8.1	6.9	5.8	3.5	4.9	6.3	8.5	8.2	10.7	92.0
Average relative humidity (%)	75.3	76.9	79.1	80.5	81.3	77.4	75.1	75.9	78.2	80.2	75.2	73.6	77.4
Source: NOAA

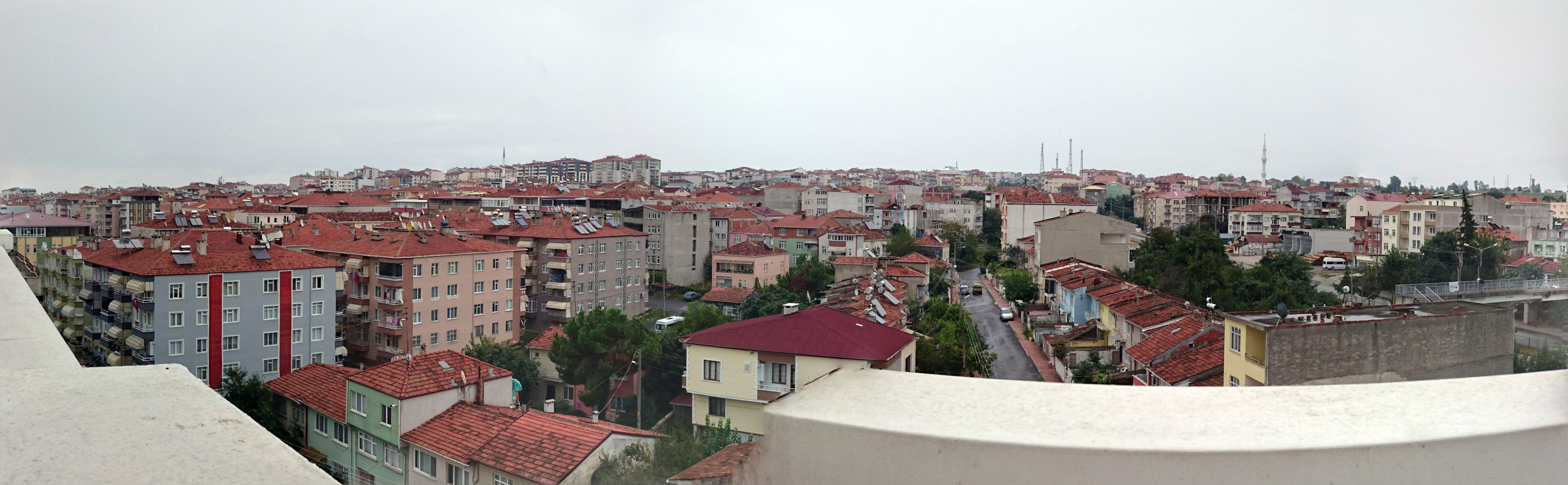
A Panoramic Photo of Bafra

== Economy ==
Bafra's economy has historically been driven by the growth and export of tobacco. The region's tobacco is known to be very low nicotine, small, red, light red colored, fine-grained, fine-grained, elastic, high-smoked, sweet, and aromatic. Foreign cigarette manufacturers were said to desire the tobacco grown on the Bafra Plain in order to improve the quality of their products. Bafra tobacco was long sought as the highest quality of natural tobacco in the world. Due to a variety of factors including agricultural mismanagement, reduced demand, logistical challenges and innovation in tobacco growth elsewhere in the world has led to a decline in tobacco exports from Bafra. This has had a significant adverse effect on the local population and contributed to persistently high unemployment and out-migration among working age people in the region. This crisis was further exacerbated by the Turkish government's shutdown of TEKEL. Today tobacco production in the region is negligible with most former farms now growing other products.

== Cuisine ==
- İçli Pide: is Bafra's most famous dish. Colloquially known as Pide, this is a popular and savory dish known for its origins in and around Samsun.
- Nokul: is a type of puff pastry. Nokul is a type of pastry eaten in Turkey and Bulgaria with variations. Nokul is sometimes served hot as an appetizer instead of bread. It consists of a rolled sheet of yeast dough onto which feta-style white cheese, walnut or poppy seed is sprinkled over a thin coat of butter. The dough is then rolled, cut into individual portions, and baked.
- Turkish delight with Cream: Residents of Bafra use a special cream made from buffalo milk. This is only available during certain months of the year.
- Dondurma: A special type of sticky, yellow vanilla ice cream is produced in Bafra and is regionally popular. The ice cream is pounded and produced in a fashion that takes several hours.

== Festivals ==
- Karadede Fair: A fair with over 100 years of history that was established in Gökçeağaç Village. The festival is held annually in Bafra on the last Sunday of August. Thousands of people attend the fair enjoying concerts, various events and shows. The fair has a wide array of stands and food vendors.
- Bafra Watermelon Festival: An annual celebration is held in Bafra to celebrate the welcoming of watermelon to Turkey. The festival includes concerts, folklore performances, exhibitions and conferences about watermelon. The festival ceased operation in 2014.
- Sele-Sepet top Kandil: A festival held on the 15th night of Ramadan month.
- Kapikaya Festival: Nature and Sports Festival: A festival that lasts for 5 days on the Kapikaya Hill to the south of Bafra. The festival offers the opportunity to do various outdoor sports and aims to bring together national and international athletes over a shared love of nature.

== Weaving and crafts ==
Regional crafts such as carpet and rug knitting have continued to hold an important place in the life of residents of Bafra. Rug weaving, wicker and zembell knitting and other handicrafts made by residents play a part in the region's economy and touristic appeal.
