= Ondokuz Mayıs University Olympic Swimming Pool =

Swimming pool in north Turkey

- Ondokuzmayıs Üniversitesi Olimpik Yüzme Havuzu
- Location: Atakum, Samsun, Turkey

Website
- havuz.omu.edu.tr

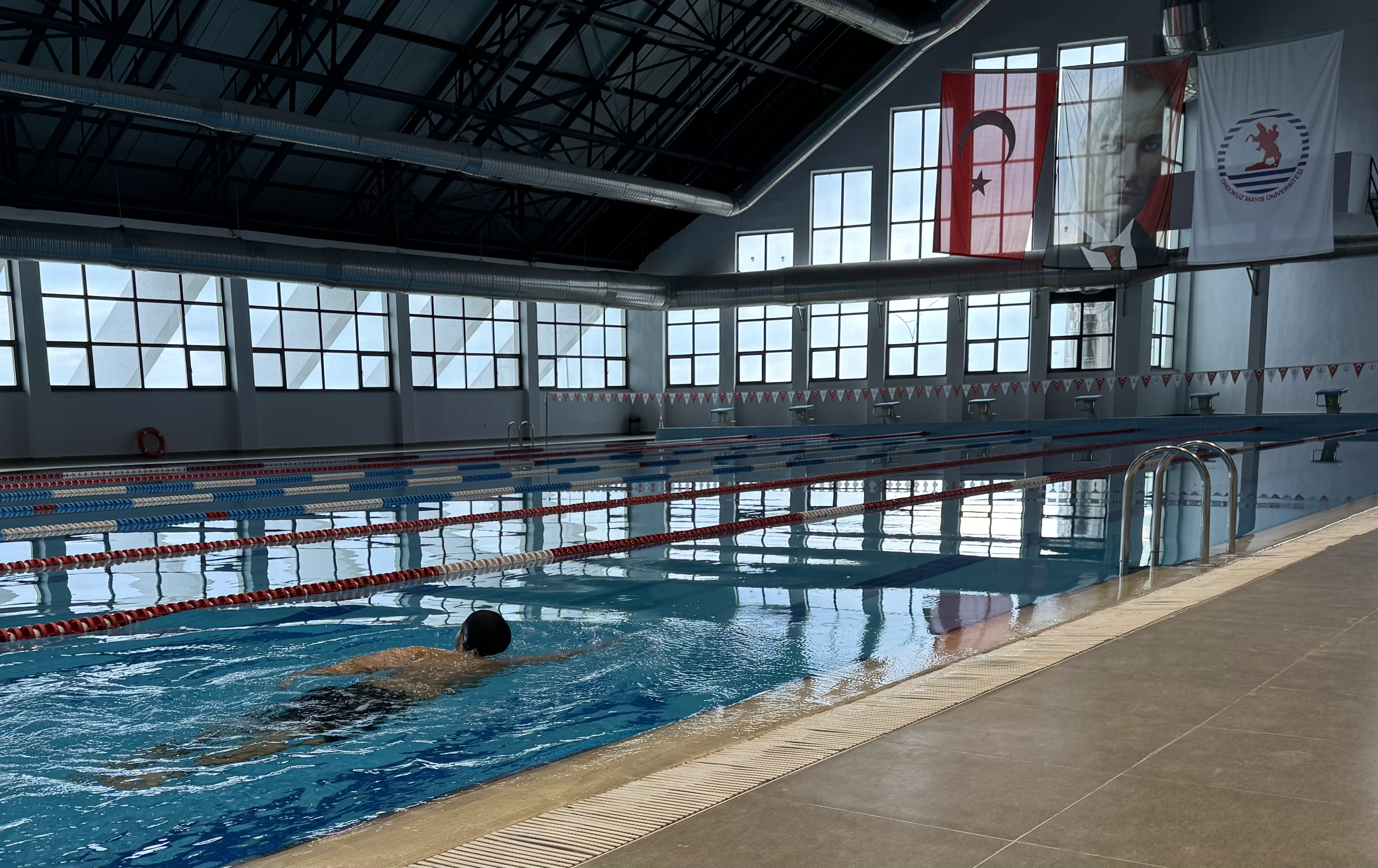
First swimmer of the day

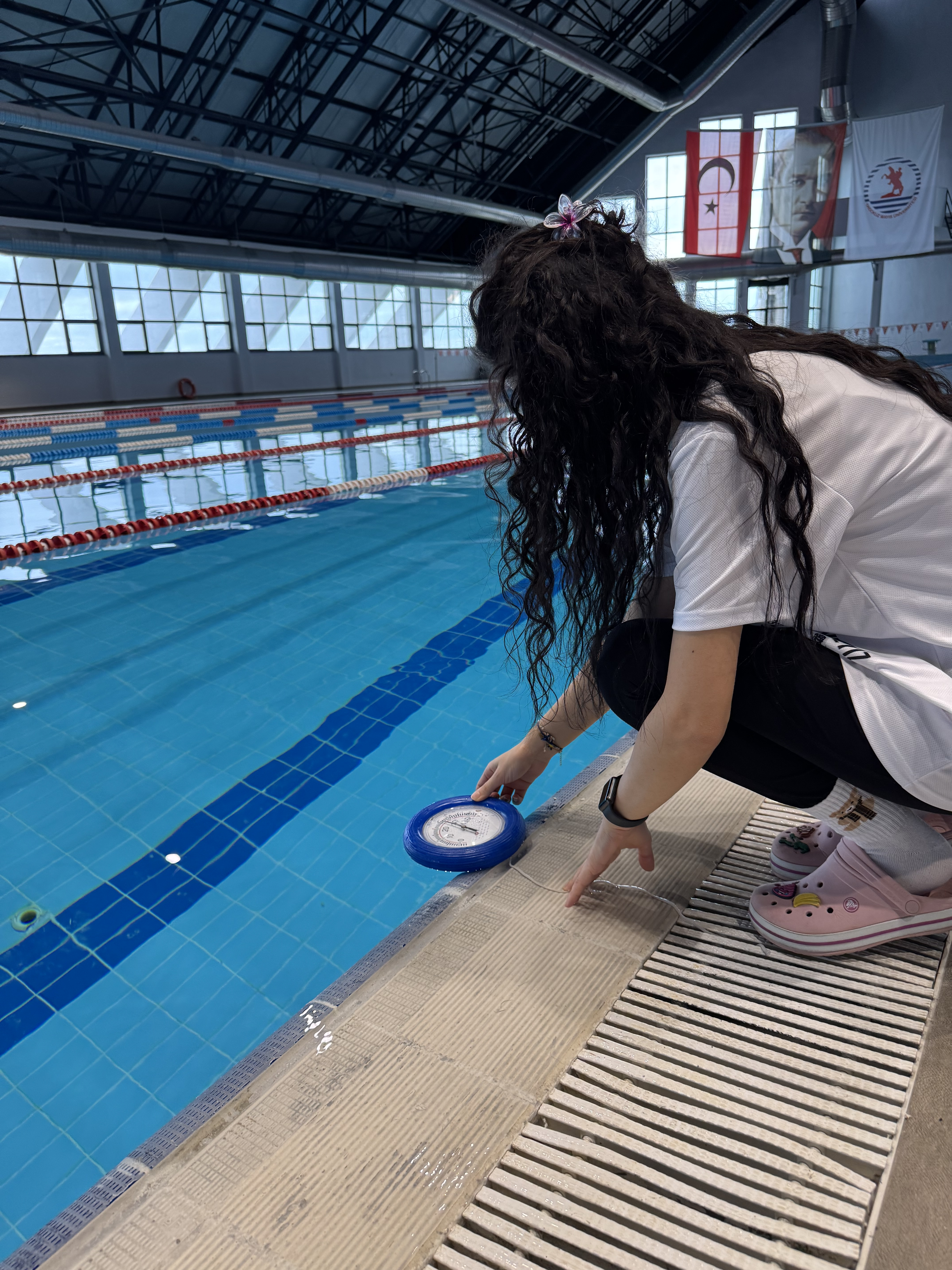
Staff checking water temperature before pool opens

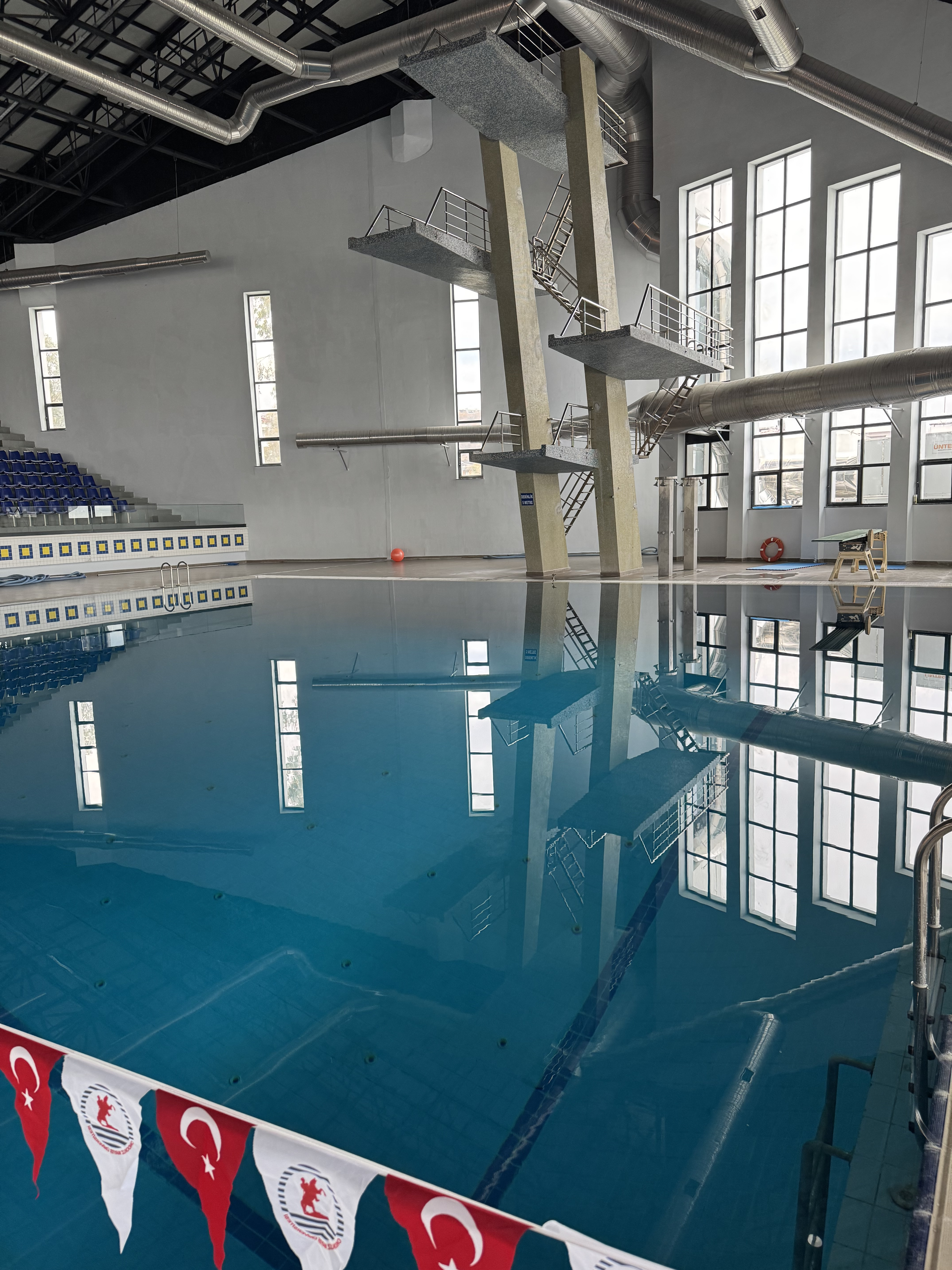
Diving boards

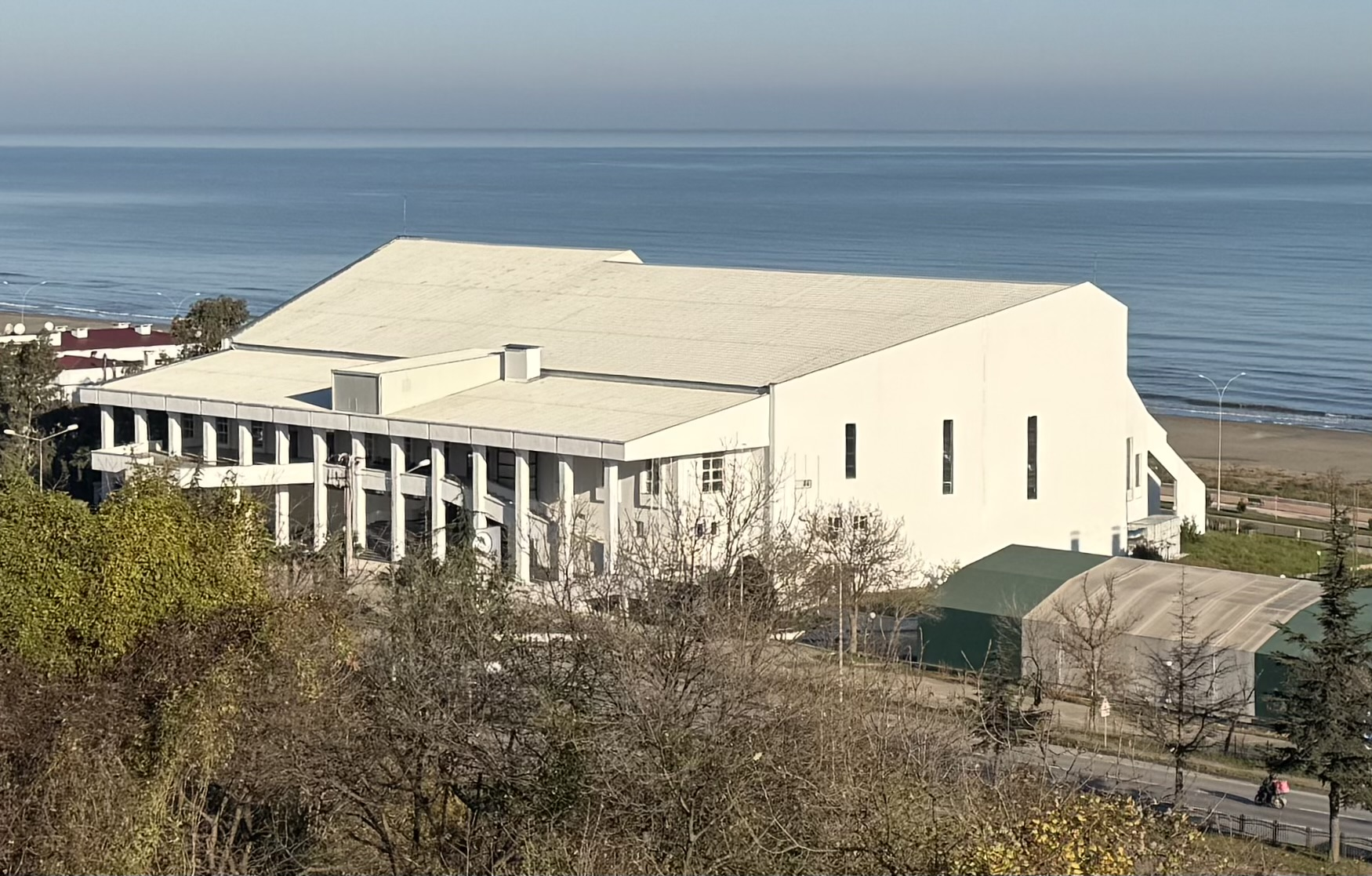
Pool from Rektörlük tram stop

Ondokuz Mayıs University has an indoor olympic-size swimming pool in Atakum district in the city of Samsun, northern Turkey. Atakum Olympic Swimming Pool is also in the district.

Opened in 2001, the pool has also been used for research, and was closed for renovation in 2021 and reopened in 2024. Swimmers not at the university can also join. There is capacity for 1400 spectators.
