= Köprücü, Kemalpaşa =

Köprücü
- Village
- Location within Turkey
- Coordinates: 41°28′N 41°34′E
- Country: Turkey
- Province: Artvin
- District: Kemalpaşa
- Population (2021): 729
- Time zone: UTC+3 (TRT)

Köprücü is a village in the Kemalpaşa District, Artvin Province, Turkey. Its population is 729 (2021).
