= Üçkardeş, Kemalpaşa =

Üçkardeş
- Village
- Location within Turkey
- Coordinates: 41.5015°N 41.5382°E
- Country: Turkey
- Province: Artvin
- District: Kemalpaşa
- Population (2021): 179
- Time zone: UTC+3 (TRT)

Üçkardeş (Laz language: Sumcuma; three brothers) is a village in the Kemalpaşa District, Artvin Province, Turkey. Its population is 179 (2021).
