= Karaosmaniye, Kemalpaşa =

Karaosmaniye
- Village
- Location within Turkey
- Coordinates: 41°28′N 41°31′E
- Country: Turkey
- Province: Artvin
- District: Kemalpaşa
- Population (2021): 175
- Time zone: UTC+3 (TRT)

Karaosmaniye is a village in the Kemalpaşa District, Artvin Province, Turkey. Its population is 175 (2021).
