= İyidere District =

District of Rize Province, Turkey

- District
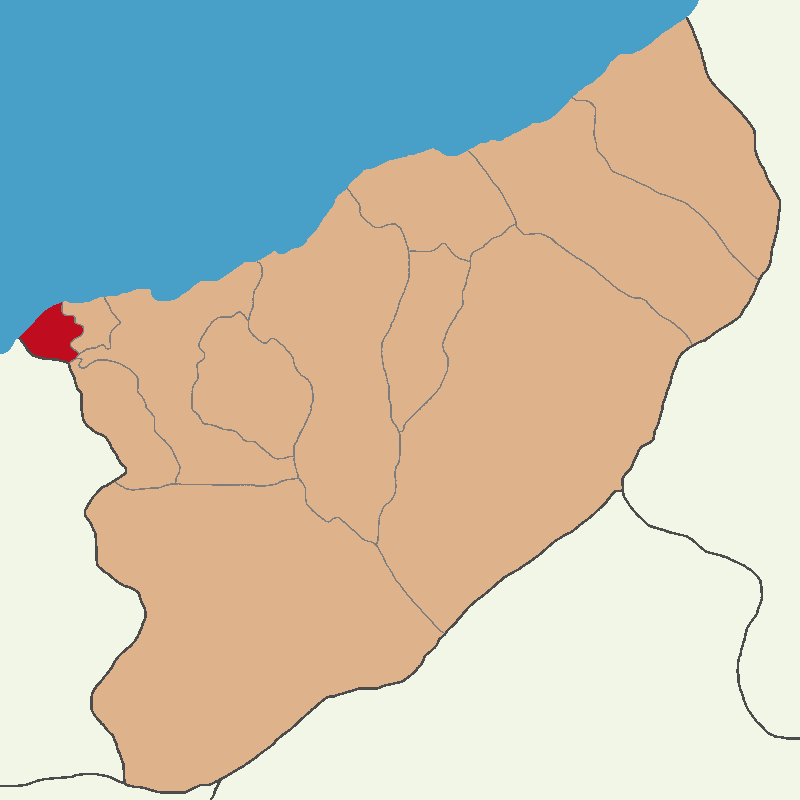
- Map showing İyidere District in Rize Province

- Location in Turkey
- Coordinates: 41°00′N 40°22′E
- Country: Turkey
- Province: Rize
- Seat: İyidere

Government
  - Kaymakam: Hasan Musab Okatan
- Area: 28 km^{2} (11 sq mi)
- Population (2021): 8,609
  - Density: 310/km^{2} (800/sq mi)
- Time zone: UTC+3 (TRT)
- Website: www.iyidere.gov.tr

İyidere District is a district of the Rize Province of Turkey. Its seat is the town of İyidere. Its area is 28 km^{2}, and its population is 8,609 (2021).

== Composition ==
There is one municipality in İyidere District:

- İyidere

There are 7 villages in İyidere District:

- Büyükçiftlikköyü
- Çiftlikköy
- Denizgören
- Kalecik
- Köşklü
- Taşhane
- Yaylacılar
