= Kemalpaşa, Artvin =

Kemalpaşa Noghedi, Makriyali ნოღედი, მაკრიალი
- Municipality
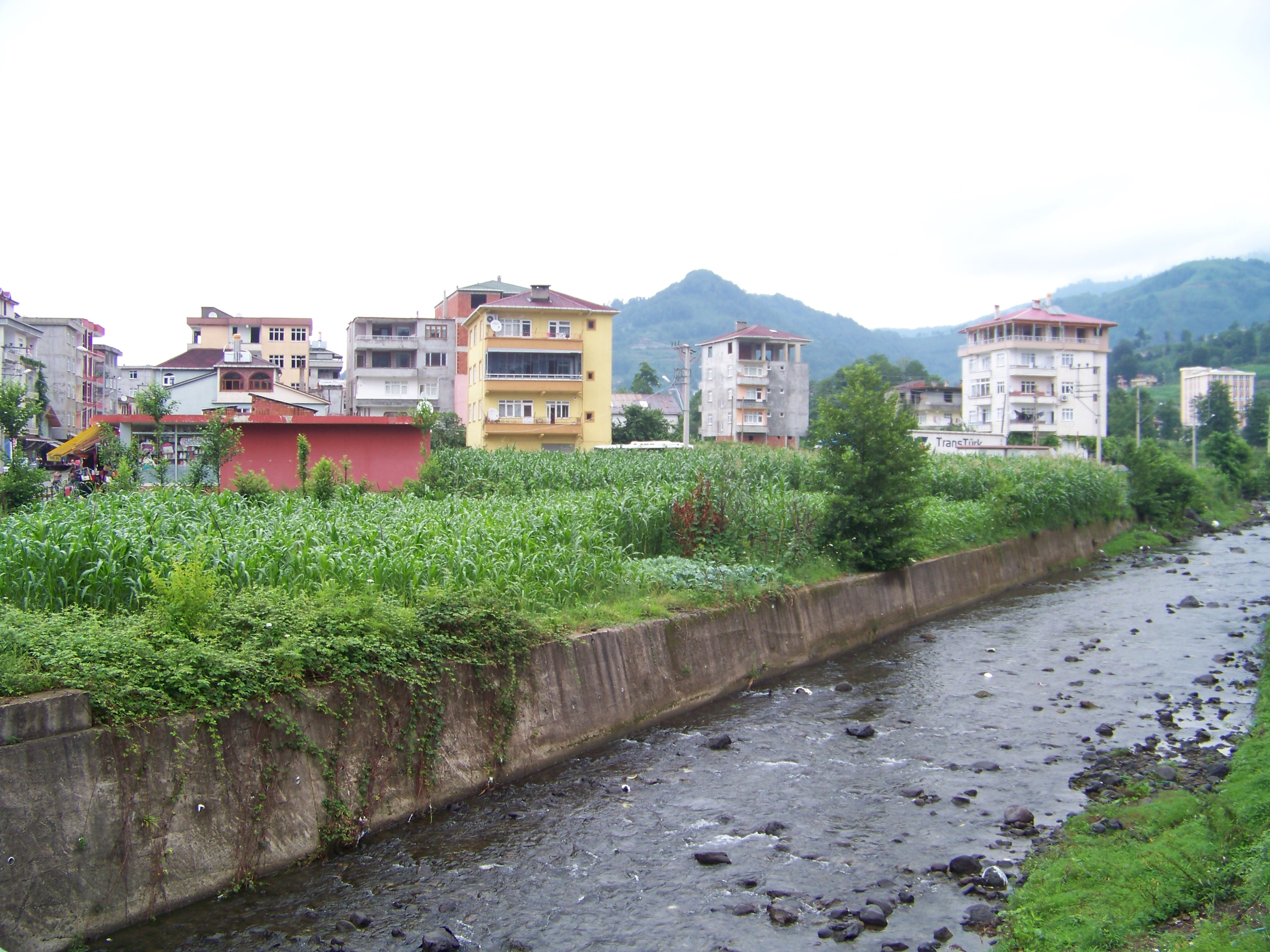

- Location within Turkey
- Coordinates: 41°29′N 41°32′E
- Country: Turkey
- Province: Artvin
- District: Kemalpaşa

Government
  - Mayor: Ergül Akçiçek (CHP)
- Elevation: 10 m (33 ft)
- Population (2021): 5,715
- Time zone: UTC+3 (TRT)
- Postal code: 08610
- Area code: 0466
- Website: www.kemalpasa.bel.tr

Kemalpaşa, also known originally as Noghedi or Makriyali, (Note: Georgian: მაკრიალი, romanized: Makriali or Laz: ნოღედი, romanized: Noghedi) is a town on the Black Sea coast in Artvin Province, Turkey. It is the seat of Kemalpaşa District. Its population is 5,715 (2021). It is 15 kilometres (9.3 mi) east of Hopa and 5 kilometres (3.1 mi) west of the Sarp border check point to Georgia.

Until 1547, it was a part of the Principality of Guria of the Kingdom of Imereti. In June 1367, here in Makriali Church, the royal wedding took place between the king Bagrat V of Georgia and Anna of Trebizond. In 1547, it was annexed by the Ottoman Empire. From 1915 to 1917, it was occupied by the Russian Empire during the First World War. From 1918 to 1921, Kemalpaşa became a part of the Democratic Republic of Georgia. After the occupation of the Georgian Democratic Republic by the Soviet Red Army, the village was ceded to Turkey in 1922. In 1987, it was declared a township. It became the seat of a district in 2017.

== See also ==
- Selimiye Tunnel
