= Osmaniye, Kemalpaşa =

Osmaniye
- Village
- Location within Turkey
- Coordinates: 41.4707°N 41.5338°E
- Country: Turkey
- Province: Artvin
- District: Kemalpaşa
- Population (2021): 410
- Time zone: UTC+3 (TRT)

Osmaniye is a village in the Kemalpaşa District, Artvin Province, Turkey. Its population is 410 (2021).
