= Selimiye Tunnel =

Road tunnel in Artvin Province, Turkey

Selimiye Tunnel Selimiye Tüneli
- Interactive map of Selimiye Tunnel; Selimiye Tüneli

Overview
- Location: Artvin Province, Turkey
- Coordinates: 41°28′20″N 41°30′15″E Location of Selimiye Tunnel in Turkey
- Status: Operational
- Route: D.010 E70

Operation
- Opened: 2010; 16 years ago
- Operator: General Directorate of Highways
- Traffic: automotive
- Character: single-tube one-way

Technical
- Length: 1,366 m (4,482 ft)
- No. of lanes: 1 x 2

The Selimiye Tunnel (Turkish: Selimiye Tüneli) is a road tunnel constructed on the Black Sea Coastal Highway D.010 E70, situated between Hopa and Kemalpaşa in Artvin Province, northeastern Turkey.

Situated near Selimiye village, the 1,366 m (4,482 ft)-long single-tube tunnel carries two lanes of traffic in east-bound direction only. Selimiye Tunnel is flanked by a series of shorter tunnels on the same route.

The construction of the tunnel was preceded by a major landslide, which occurs often in the region. After the east-bound part of divided highway was blocked by a landslide, traffic was maintained a long time on the west-bound part. The problem was solved by building a series of tunnels on the east-bound highway part, in the vicinity of Selimiye village. The construction works began on 25 August 2009. In October 2010, the tunnel was put into service. However, another landslide occurred on October 2013 in the same place, blocking the west-bound part of the highway in a length of 150 m (490 ft). During the road maintenance period, the Selimiye Tunnel was temporarily used for bi-directional.
