= Güzelyalı, Atakum =

Güzelyalı
- Neighbourhood
- Location within Turkey
- Coordinates: 41°20′45″N 36°15′01″E
- Country: Turkey
- Province: Samsun
- District: Atakum
- Population (2022): 4,253
- Time zone: UTC+3 (TRT)
- Postal code: 55200
- Area code: 0362
- Climate: Cfa

Guzelyalı is a neighbourhood in the municipality and district of Atakum, Samsun Province, Turkey. It is an affluent residential neighbourhood. The neighbourhood had a population of 4,253 as of 2022, up from 1,762 in 2007.

== History ==
Guzelyalı was established primarily as a farming and summer resort community to the west of Samsun. It is a low-lying district along the coast of the Black Sea. Since the 1990s, the neighborhood has developed in a more urban mid-rise form similar to the rest of Atakum. Guzelyalı is bounded by the Black Sea to the north, the Çobanlı Pier to the east, Körfez to the west and the Ataturk Boulevard to the south.

Guzelyalı is home to several dozen hotels, guest houses, bars and restaurants which run along Adnan Menderes Boulevard. Due to its pleasant climate and location adjacent to the seafront promenade, the neighborhood has grown rapidly, especially since 2007 as evidenced by census figures from TUIK.

== Population ==
Historical population
Year	Pop.	±% p.a.
2007	1,762	—
2012	3,104	+11.99%
2017	3,796	+4.11%
2022	4,253	+2.30%
Source: TÜIK (2007-2022)
