= Dereiçi, Kemalpaşa =

Dereiçi
- Village
- Location within Turkey
- Coordinates: 41.4662°N 41.5108°E
- Country: Turkey
- Province: Artvin
- District: Kemalpaşa
- Population (2021): 96
- Time zone: UTC+3 (TRT)

Dereiçi (Laz language: Maiskioput'e) is a village in the Kemalpaşa District, Artvin Province, Turkey. Its population is 96 (2021).
