= Sarp, Kemalpaşa =

Sarp
- Village
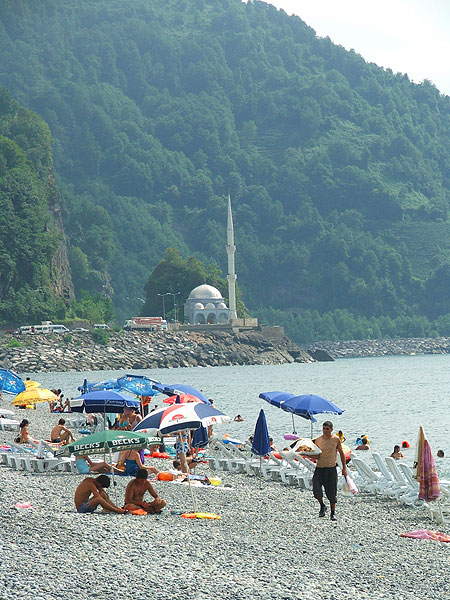
- Sarp seen from Georgia

- Location within Turkey
- Coordinates: 41°31′04″N 41°32′55″E
- Country: Turkey
- Province: Artvin
- District: Kemalpaşa
- Population (2021): 177
- Time zone: UTC+3 (TRT)

Sarp is a village in the Kemalpaşa District, Artvin Province, Turkey. Its population is 177 (2021). Situated on the Black Sea coast, it is a border crossing point to Sarpi in Georgia.
