= Derepazarı =

- Municipality
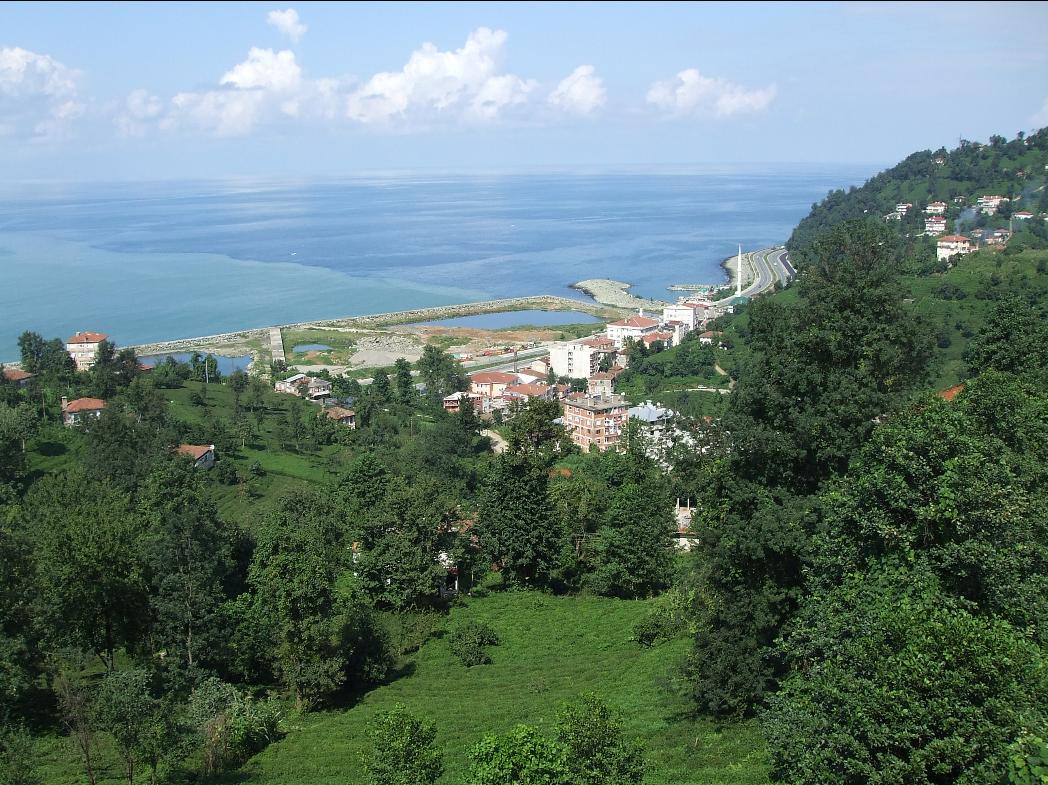

- Location within Turkey
- Coordinates: 41°01′29″N 40°25′32″E
- Country: Turkey
- Province: Rize
- District: Derepazarı

Government
  - Mayor: Şaban Kalça (AKP)
- Population (2021): 3,913
- Time zone: UTC+3 (TRT)
- Area code: 0464
- Climate: Cfa
- Website: derepazari.bel.tr

Derepazarı is a town in Rize Province on the Black Sea coast of Turkey between the cities of Rize and Trabzon, 8 km west of the city of Rize. It is the seat of Derepazarı District. Its population is 3,913 (2021).

== Features ==
The district consists of a small town on the coast and an area of countryside in the mountains that rise up behind.

The Black Sea is clean in the area although there are no sandy beaches and the population of Derepazarı rises in summer with holidaymakers coming to enjoy the coast. Furthermore the mainstay of the local economy is growing and processing tea, and in summer there is seasonal work in the tea industry also.

The town centre is small as Derepazarı is very close to the city of Rize and therefore people go there for shopping etc.

== Climate ==
Derepazarı has a humid subtropical climate (Köppen: Cfa).

Climate data for Derepazarı
Month	Jan	Feb	Mar	Apr	May	Jun	Jul	Aug	Sep	Oct	Nov	Dec	Year
Daily mean °C (°F)	6.7 (44.1)	6.9 (44.4)	8.2 (46.8)	11.9 (53.4)	15.8 (60.4)	19.7 (67.5)	22.3 (72.1)	22.4 (72.3)	19.7 (67.5)	15.9 (60.6)	12.1 (53.8)	8.9 (48.0)	14.2 (57.6)
Average precipitation mm (inches)	185 (7.3)	145 (5.7)	125 (4.9)	82 (3.2)	82 (3.2)	112 (4.4)	95 (3.7)	128 (5.0)	166 (6.5)	215 (8.5)	195 (7.7)	200 (7.9)	1,730 (68)
Source: Climate-Data.org
