= İyidere =

- Municipality
- Location within Turkey
- Coordinates: 41°0′43″N 40°21′43″E
- Country: Turkey
- Province: Rize
- District: İyidere

Government
  - Mayor: Saffet Mete (AKP)
- Population (2021): 5,362
- Time zone: UTC+3 (TRT)
- Area code: 0464
- Climate: Cfa
- Website: iyidere.bel.tr

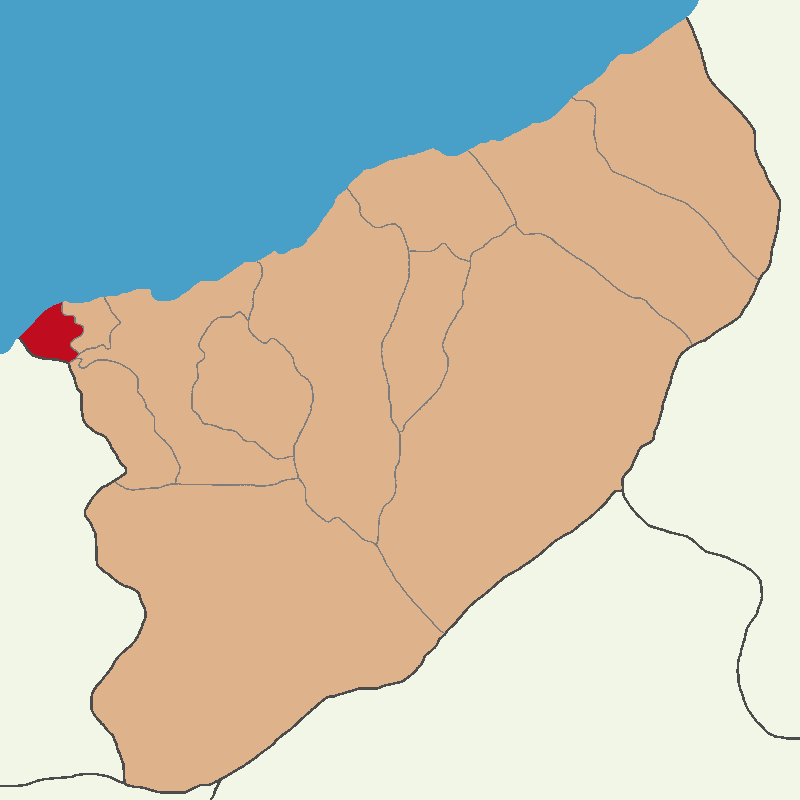
İyidere ilçe merkezi

İyidere is a town in Rize Province on the Black Sea coast of north-eastern Turkey, 14 km from the city of Rize. It is the seat of İyidere District. Its population is 5,362 (2021).

Formerly known as Aspet, İyidere is a green rural district. The local economy depends on growing and processing tea, plus some other farming and fishing.

== Climate ==
İyidere has a humid subtropical climate (Köppen: Cfa).

Climate data for İyidere
Month	Jan	Feb	Mar	Apr	May	Jun	Jul	Aug	Sep	Oct	Nov	Dec	Year
Daily mean °C (°F)	6.5 (43.7)	6.8 (44.2)	8.1 (46.6)	11.7 (53.1)	15.7 (60.3)	19.5 (67.1)	22.1 (71.8)	22.4 (72.3)	19.8 (67.6)	15.7 (60.3)	12.1 (53.8)	8.7 (47.7)	14.1 (57.4)
Average precipitation mm (inches)	172 (6.8)	134 (5.3)	117 (4.6)	79 (3.1)	80 (3.1)	106 (4.2)	88 (3.5)	118 (4.6)	154 (6.1)	201 (7.9)	183 (7.2)	185 (7.3)	1,617 (63.7)
Source: Climate-Data.org

== History ==
See Rize Province for the history of the area, once part of the trading network of the Ancient Greeks based in Miletos, who founded the port of İyidere, then part of the Roman Empire, the Byzantine Empire and the Empire of Trebizond until it was brought into the Ottoman Empire by Mehmet II in 1461.
