= Kintrishi Strict Nature Reserve =

Protected nature area in Georgia (country)

- IUCN category Ia (strict nature reserve)
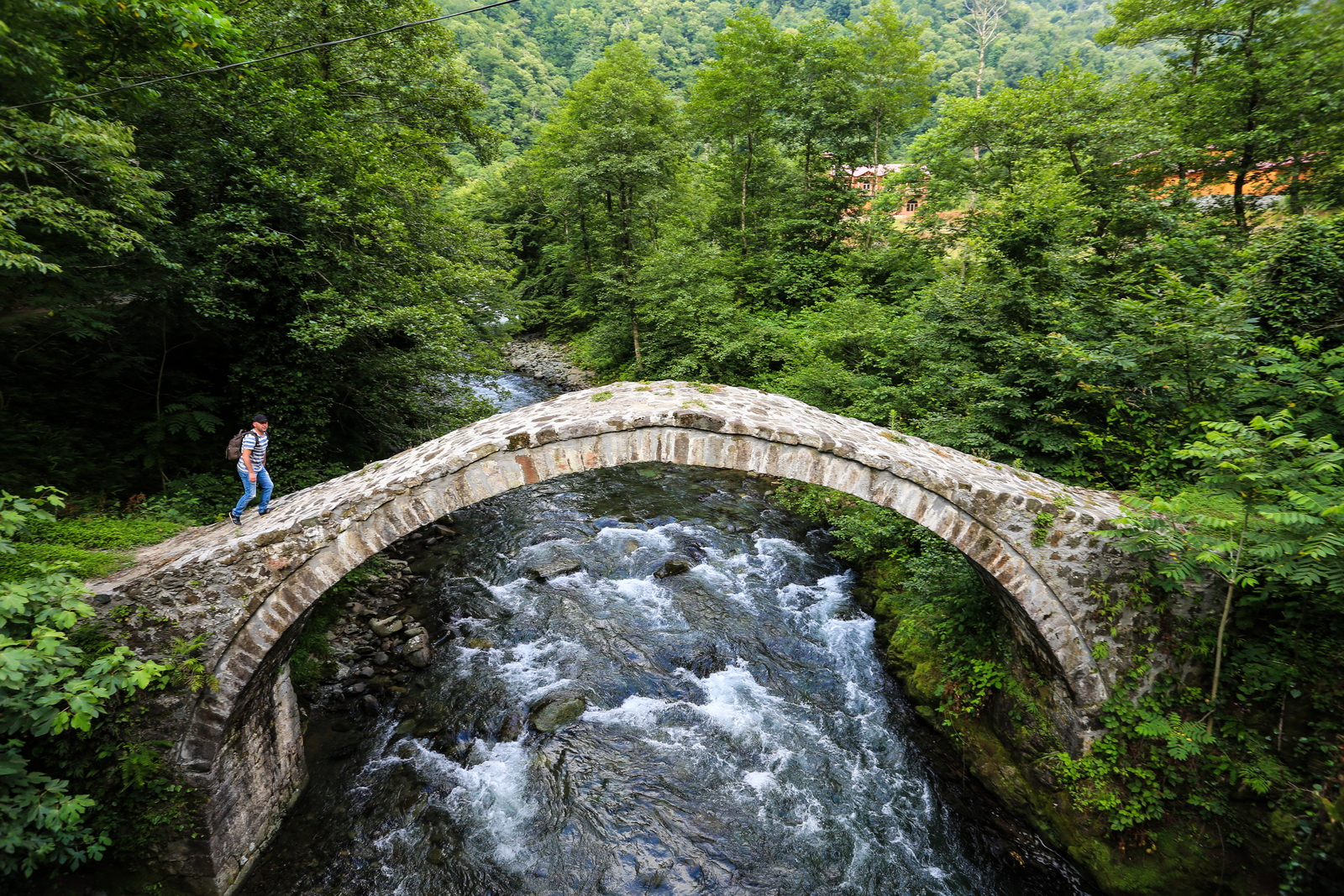
- Arch bridge in Kintrishi Strict Nature Reserve

- Location within Georgia Location within Adjara
- Location: Georgia
- Coordinates: 41°44′57″N 42°02′04″E
- Area: 55.86 km^{2} (21.57 sq mi)
- Established: 1959
- Governing body: Agency of Protected Areas
- Website: Kintrishi Protected Areas Administration

UNESCO World Heritage Site
- Part of: Colchic Rainforests and Wetlands
- Criteria: Natural: ix, x
- Reference: 1616bis-001
- Inscription: 2021 (44th Session)

Kintrishi Strict Nature Reserve (Georgian: კინტრიშის სახელმწიფო ნაკრძალი) is a protected area in Kobuleti Municipality, Adjara region of Georgia in the upper part of the Kintrishi River at an altitude of 300–2,500 meters above sea level between the village of Tskhemvani (Tskhemlovana) and Khino Mountain in the Meskheti Range. It was established in 1959 to preserve relict humid forests and wetlands, in addition to its high number of endemic and threatened flora and fauna. Because of the ancient forests and high biodiversity within the nature reserve, it was inscribed on the UNESCO World Heritage List in 2021 as part of the Colchic Rainforests and Wetlands site.

== Geography ==
The broader Kintrishi Protected Areas include the Kintrishi Strict Nature Reserve and Kintrishi National Park.

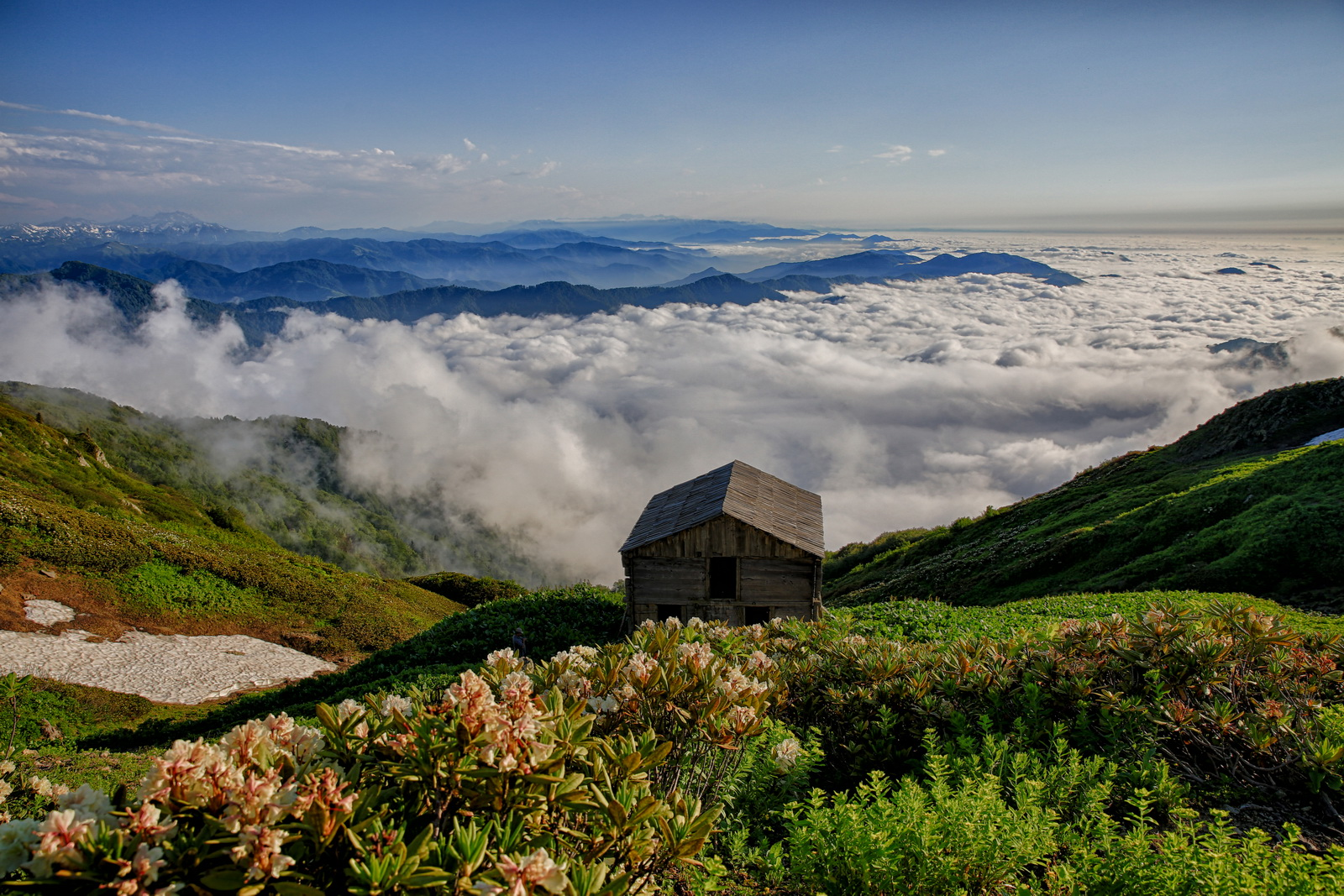
View from Kintrishi Protected Area

The Kintrishi Strict Nature Reserve is located in the valley of the river Kintrishi, which originates from Mount Khino and discharges into the Black Sea near the resort town of Kobuleti. At its lowest elevation, it is at 300 metres (980 ft) above sea level, and its alpine pastures are at elevation of 2,500 metres (8,200 ft). Kintrishi Strict Nature Reserve is bordered from the north by the Kobuleti forest administration, from the east by Shuakhevi Municipality, from the south by Keda Municipality and from the southwest by Mtirala National Park. In the high mountains of the reserve, at a height of 2,200 metres (7,200 ft), there is the small Tbikeli lake. The nearby lake Sidzerdzali is outside the boundaries of the reserve.

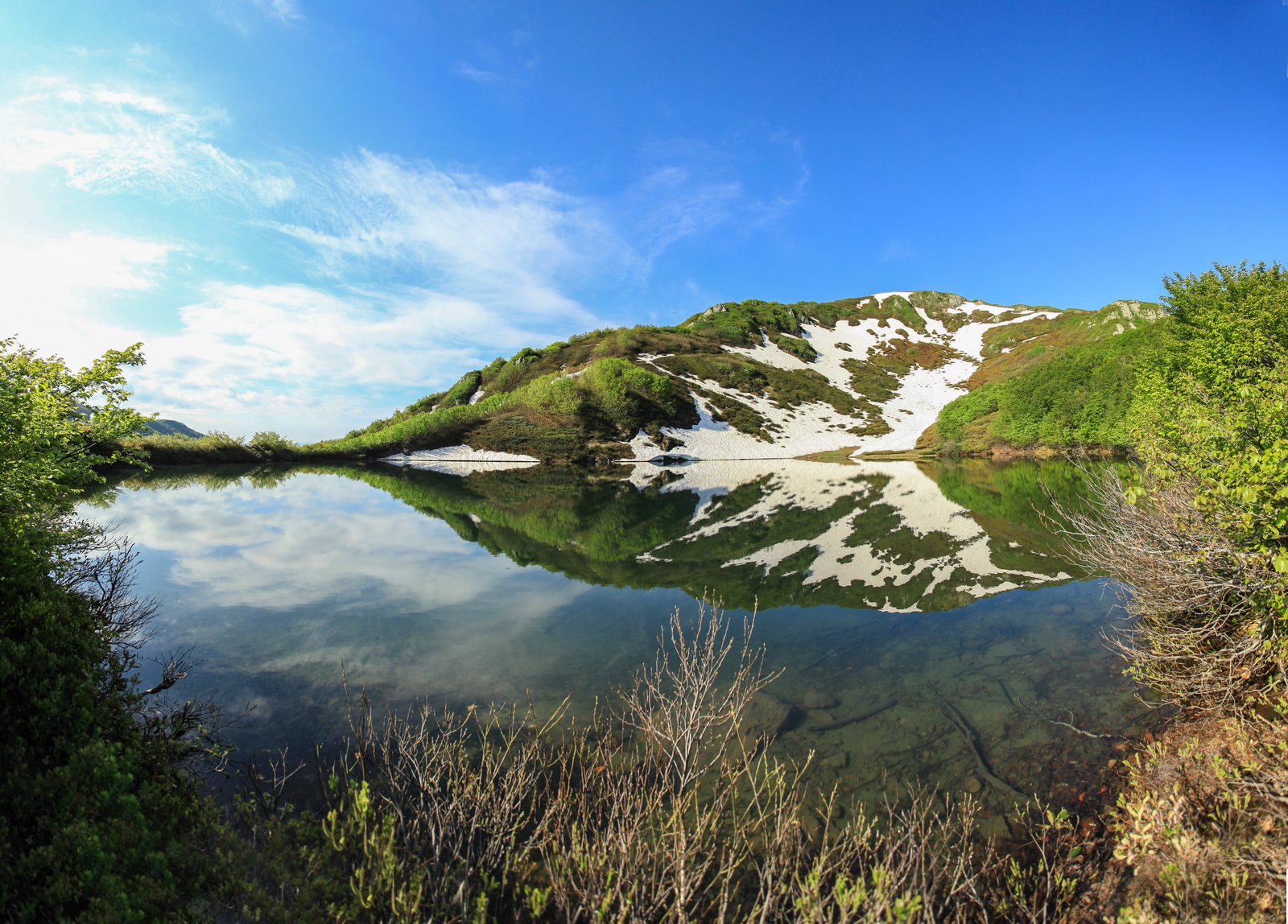
Tbikeli lake

== Climate ==
Surrounding mountains entrap humid air from the sea, thus providing high humidity in Kintrishi. Over the course of the year, the amount of precipitation is the same as in the coast of Adjara, around 3,000 millimetres (120 in). The mean temperature in August is 24 °C (75 °F), and 4 °C (39 °F) in January.

== Biodiversity ==
As part of the Euxine–Colchic deciduous forests ecoregion along an elevational gradient. Kintrishi Strict Nature Reserve contains a wide diversity of ecosystems, including lowland forests and montane meadows. Over 900 species of plants are found in the area, including the Common hornbeam, Oriental beech, and Caucasian fir. 65 of these species are endemic to the Caucasus. In addition, the reserve is hotspot of mayfly with 34 species. Roughly 189 bird species, 65 mammal species, and 14 reptile species have also been observed in or around the reserve. The reserve is located in a bottleneck where more than 1 million migrating raptors of 35 species pass through during the autumn.

== See also ==
- Kintrishi National Park
- Euxine–Colchic deciduous forests
