= List of World Heritage Sites in Georgia =

Location of World Heritage Sites in Georgia. The Colchic Rainforests comprise seven sites, Grigoleti is shown.

The United Nations Educational, Scientific and Cultural Organization (UNESCO) designates World Heritage Sites of outstanding universal value to cultural or natural heritage which have been nominated by countries which are signatories to the UNESCO World Heritage Convention, established in 1972. Cultural heritage consists of monuments (such as architectural works, monumental sculptures, or inscriptions), groups of buildings, and sites (including archaeological sites). Natural heritage consists of natural features (physical and biological formations), geological and physiographical formations (including habitats of threatened species of animals and plants), and natural sites which are important from the point of view of science, conservation, or natural beauty. Georgia ratified the convention on 4 November 1992.

As of 2020, Georgia has four sites on the list and a further fourteen on the tentative list. The first two sites inscribed to the list were the Historical Monuments of Mtskheta and the site comprising Bagrati Cathedral and Gelati Monastery, in 1994. However, due to major reconstruction detrimental to its integrity and authenticity, Bagrati Cathedral was put to the List of World Heritage in Danger in 2010 and then delisted as a World Heritage Site in 2017. Upper Svaneti was listed in 1996 and the most recent site listed was the Colchic Rainforests and Wetlands, in 2021. The latter is the only natural site of Georgia, the other three are of the cultural type.

== World Heritage Sites ==
UNESCO lists sites under ten criteria; each entry must meet at least one of the criteria. Criteria i through vi are cultural, and vii through x are natural.

World Heritage Sites
| Site | Image | Location | Year listed | UNESCO data | Description |
|---|---|---|---|---|---|
| Historical Monuments of Mtskheta | Church on a top of the hill | Mtskheta-Mtianeti | 1994 | 708; iii, iv (cultural) | Mtskheta was the capital of Georgia from the 3rd century BCE to the 5th century CE, and is still the centre of the Georgian Orthodox Church. It was the place where Christianity was proclaimed as the official religion of Georgia in 337. The Jvari Monastery (pictured) dates to the 6th century while the Svetitskhoveli Cathedral and the Samtavro Monastery were built in the 11th century upon the site of earlier churches. The monuments represent different stages in the development of medieval religious architecture in the region. |
| Gelati Monastery | Two church buildings in stone | Imereti | 1994 | 710; iv (cultural) | Gelati Monastery, a masterpiece of the Georgian Golden Age, was built in 1106 by King David IV and was one of the main cultural and intellectual centres in Georgia throughout the Middle Ages. It had an academy which employed some of the most celebrated Georgian scientists, theologians, and philosophers, many of whom had previously been active at various orthodox monasteries abroad, such as from the Mangan Academy in Constantinople. At the time of inscription, the World Heritage Site also included the Bagrati Cathedral. Between 2010 and 2017, it was listed as endangered due to the cathedral undergoing major reconstruction detrimental to its integrity and authenticity. In 2017, Bagrati Cathedral was removed from the World Heritage property and Gelati Monastery was delisted from the endangered list. |
| Upper Svaneti | Stone towers in a mountain landscape | Samegrelo-Zemo Svaneti | 1996 | 709; iv, v (cultural) | Upper Svaneti is a valley along the Enguri river between the Caucasus and the Svaneti Range. The Svan communities adapted to the life in mountain regions. The most prominent architectural feature of the villages are the medieval stone towers which had both defensive and residential functions. More than 200 towers and houses have been preserved in the village of Chazhashi. |
| Colchic Rainforests and Wetlands | Forest and river from above | Samegrelo-Zemo Svaneti, Guria, Adjara | 2021 | 1616; ix, x (natural) | The coastal region of Georgia (the historical Colchis) is covered by wetlands, forests, peat bogs, lakes, and sandy dunes. Some areas are protected as Ramsar sites. They are important biodiversity spots and serve as a stop on the migration routes of birds such as the black stork, common crane, and great egret. The World Heritage Site comprises seven properties: Kintrishi-Mtirala and Ispani in Adjara, Grigoleti and Imnati in Guria, and Pitshora, Nabada, and Churia in Samegrelo-Zemo Svaneti. They are administered in Georgia as parts of the Kolkheti National Park (pictured), Kintrishi Strict Nature Reserve, Kobuleti Protected Areas, and Mtirala National Park. |

== Tentative list ==
In addition to sites inscribed on the World Heritage List, member states can maintain a list of tentative sites that they may consider for nomination. Nominations for the World Heritage List are only accepted if the site was previously listed on the tentative list. As of 2020, Georgia maintains fourteen properties on its tentative list.

Tentative sites
| Site | Image | Location | Year listed | UNESCO criteria | Description |
|---|---|---|---|---|---|
| Alaverdi Cathedral | Church from far, field in front, hills in the back | Kakheti | 2007 | iv, vi (cultural) | The cathedral was built in the first half of the 11th century on the site of a monastery dating to the 6th century. With a height of 50 metres (160 ft), it is the tallest cathedral in Georgia, and has a very spacious interior. The complex is surrounded by a fortified wall. |
| Ananuri | Monastery above the lake, hills in the background | Mtskheta-Mtianeti | 2007 | iii (cultural) | The Ananuri castle complex, built in the 17th century, is located along the Georgian Military Road. It comprises several churches with fine wall paintings and wall reliefs. The Church of the Virgin is the burial place of the eristavis (Dukes) of Aragvi. |
| David Gareji Monasteries and Hermitage | Caves with masonry around, part of the monastery | Kakheti | 2007 | i, ii, iii, iv, v, vi, vii, x (mixed) | The Georgian Orthodox monastery complex comprises 19 medieval monasteries with about 5000 cells for monks. The first monasteries were founded in the 6th century by St. David Garejeli, one of the Thirteen Assyrian Fathers who came to Georgia. The monasteries saw a golden age between the 10th and the 13th centuries, declined following the Mongol invasions, and saw a revival on a smaller scale in the 17th and 18th centuries. Murals from different periods have been preserved in churches. Remains from Bronze and Iron Age settlements have been found in the area as well. |
| Dmanisi Hominid Archaeological Site | A skull from an early hominid | Kvemo Kartli | 2007 | iii, v (cultural) | The hominid remains found at Dmanisi belong to some of the earliest hominid fossils outside Africa. The excavations have been ongoing since 1983. Several skulls, teeth, post-cranial remains, as well as stone artefacts and animal remains have been found at the site. They were dated to 1.75 million years ago and represent an important stage in human evolution. |
| Gremi Church of Archangels and Royal Tower | Church and tower above the town | Kakheti | 2007 | ii, iii (cultural) | Gremi, a city on the Silk Road, was the capital of the Kingdom of Kakheti until it was destroyed by the Safavid Shah Abbas in the 17th century and left in ruins. The Church of the Archangels was commissioned in 1565 by King Levan and represents an evolution of Georgian ecclesiastic architecture. A three-storey tower with a belfry on top is located next to the church. |
| Kvetera Church | Church with a green roof | Kakheti | 2007 | iii, iv (cultural) | Kvetera Church was built in the 10th century within a fortress complex. Architecturally, it is a derivative of the Jvari Church in Mtskheta. It is a small church with a plan that is a four-apse cross with four niches between apses. |
| Mta-Tusheti | Stone houses with several towers, hill in the background | Kakheti | 2007 | iv, v, vii, x (mixed) | Mta-Tusheti is a region on the slopes of the Caucasus mountains. The habitats up the slopes of the mountains change from forests to high meadows to the subnivean zone, and each is home to a variety of animals and plants. The vernacular architecture of the region is characterized by fortress-like buildings, similar to those in Svaneti. |
| Nikortsminda Cathedral | Church, photo from below | Racha | 2007 | ii, iv (cultural) | The Nikortsminda Cathedral, one of the most important medieval monuments in Georgia, was constructed in the early 11th century during the reign of King Bagrat III. The church has a hexagonal plan and is decorated with reliefs depicting religious themes. The interior is decorated with paintings from the 16th and 17th centuries. |
| Samtavisi Cathedral | Stone church with a prominent cross on one of the walls | Shida Kartli | 2007 | iv (cultural) | The Samtavisi Cathedral was built in 1030 and saw a major renovation in the 15th century, including rebuilding the dome and the western wall. In view of the architectural development, the cathedral introduced a new style of decoration, with a large ornamental cross on the eastern facade and a lozenge pattern. Fragments of the 17th century frescos remain in the interior. |
| Shatili | Stone houses with several towers, hill in the background | Mtskheta-Mtianeti | 2007 | v (cultural) | Shatili is a mountain village at an elevation of 1,400 metres (4,600 ft), located in the Argun River gorge. The village is a fortress complex, with buildings serving both in residential and defence functions. The village dates to the late medieval and early modern period. |
| Tbilisi Historic District | View at the Tbilisi from the river in the Narikala fortress direction | Tbilisi | 2007 | ii, iii, iv, v, vi (cultural) | Tbilisi, the capital of Georgia, was an important city on the Silk Road and a major centre in the Caucasus region. It was founded in the 5th century CE and was marked by influences of different cultures. The city is located on the banks of the Mtkvari River and is overlooked by the Narikala Fortress. Typical features of Tbilisi are balconies and courtyards of residential houses. |
| Uplistsikhe Cave Town | Touristing looking at the caves | Shida Kartli | 2007 | ii, iii, iv, v (cultural) | First traces of human occupation at Uplistsikhe date to the 2nd millennium BCE. It was an important centre during the Hellenistic period and late antiquity, reached another heyday from the 9th to 11th centuries, and was ultimately ravaged during the Mongol raids in the 13th century. The town is cut in rock, including a palace complex and a three-nave basilica from the 6th century. Some caves have complex decorations. |
| Vani | Golden diadem featuring lions and boars | Imereti | 2007 | ii, iii, vi (cultural) | Vani was an ancient city in the historic region of Colchis that was inhabited from the 7th to the 1st century BCE. It was a political and religious centre of the area. In the Hellenistic period, the city saw a significant influence of Greek culture, in view of architecture, jewellery, and burial customs. The archaeological excavations uncovered a large number of artefacts that are now on display at the Georgian National Museum in Tbilisi. |
| Vardzia-Khertvisi | Hill with caves | Samtskhe–Javakheti | 2007 | ii, iii, iv, v, vi, vii (mixed) | This nomination comprises the gorge of the Mtkvari River in the length of 18 kilometres (11 mi) between the Khertvisi Fortress and the rock monastery in Vardzia that was constructed in the 12th and 13th centuries. Human settlements have been adapted to the layout of the landscape. |

== See also ==
- Tourism in Georgia
