= Colchis Lowland =

Geographical area in Georgia

Colchis Lowland is located in western Georgia

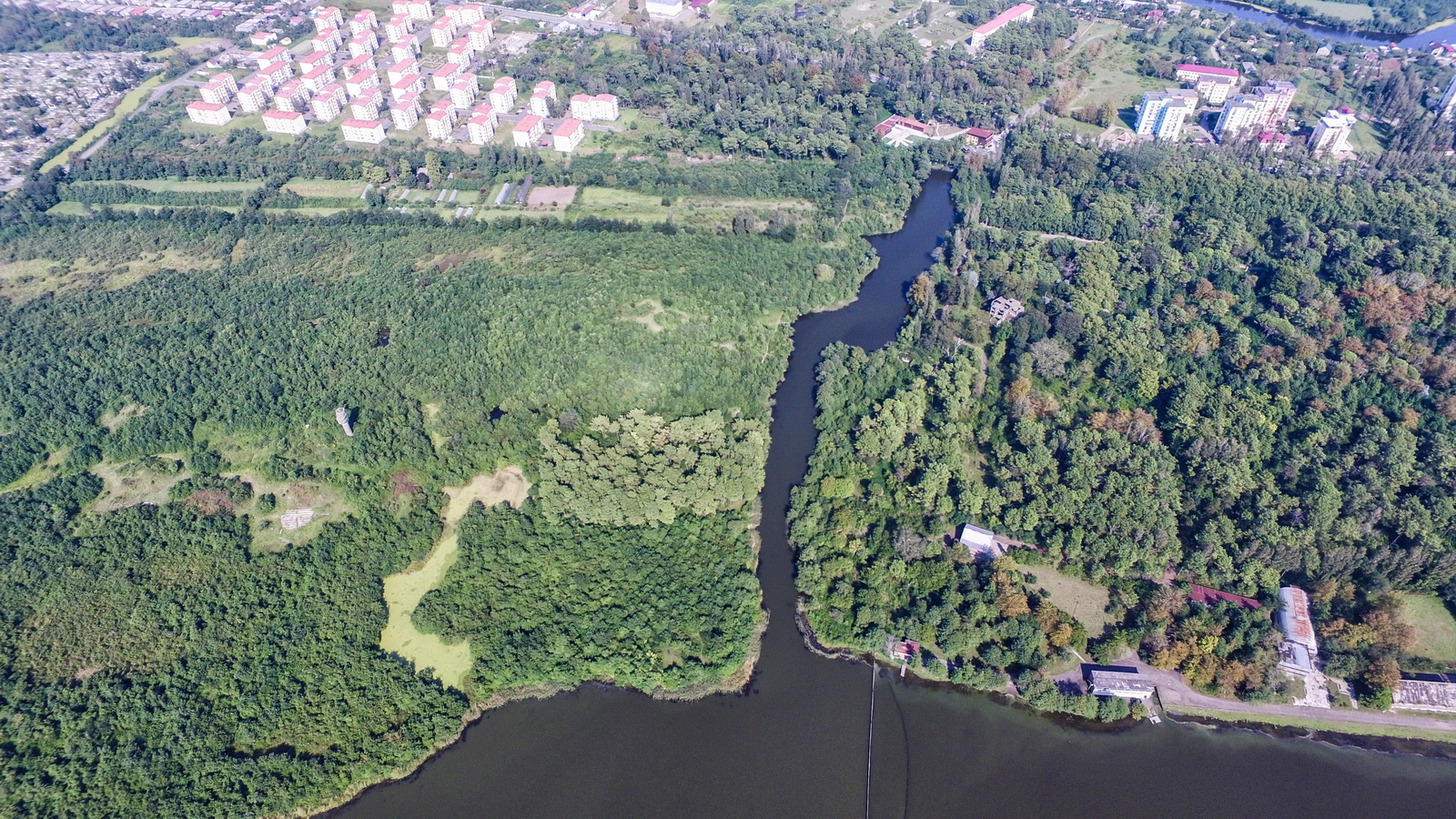
A portion of the Colchis coastal plain near the town of Poti

The Colchis Lowland (Georgian: კოლხეთის დაბლობი, K’olkhetis dablobi) is a geographical area in Georgia, which consists of a coastal lowland plain of the eastern Black Sea. Named after Colchis, an ancient Greek name for this region, the lowland is nearly triangular, squeezed between the Greater Caucasus and Lesser Caucasus mountains, with its base leaning on the Black Sea and apex directed to the east, reaching the environs of the town of Zestaponi. To the northwest and southwest, respectively, the plain continues as narrow coastal strips in Abkhazia and Adjara.

The Colchis Lowland is formed by the combined alluvial plains of the Rioni, Inguri, Khobi, Supsa, Chorokhi, and other rivers, which have sources in the Greater and Lesser Caucasus ranges. The lowland has an average elevation of 100 to 150 m, but some places are located below sea level. It is located in a damp subtropical climate zone, with an annual precipitation of about 1,500 mm. The surface of the lowland was formed in Late Pleistocene and Holocene. It has significantly been modified by human activity. The region's subtropical conditions have supported agriculture since ancient times; citrus fruits, tea, and tung are grown, mostly on the surrounding foothills. The wetter lowlands in the centre of the plain collect cold air, and frosts preclude the cultivation of more sensitive crops. Parts of the Colchis Lowland are included in a series of national parks and protected areas. Because of the region's biodiversity and range of ecosystems (including deciduous rainforests and wetlands, percolation bogs, and other mire types), part of the Colchis Lowland were inscribed on the UNESCO World Heritage List in 2021, as the Colchic Rainforests and Wetlands site.
