= GMiri =

- Presented by: Giorgi Korkia
- No. of days: 26
- No. of castaways: 17
- Winner: Tamar Chanturashvili
- Runner-up: Zviad Tavartkiladze
- Location: Johor, Malaysia
- No. of episodes: 15

Release
- Original network: Rustavi 2
- Original release: October 6, 2007 – January 7, 2008

Ukanaskneli Gmiri (Georgian: უკანასკნელი გმირი; English: The Last Hero) is the Georgian version of the show Survivor. The show ran for one season, that lasted from October 6, 2007 to January 7, 2008.

Throughout the season, the contestants were broken up into two tribes, the blue tribe and the yellow tribe. The twists for this season began in episode one when, immediately following the initial reward challenge, the losing blue tribe was forced to vote someone out on the spot. During the pre-tribe stage, the blue tribe was over powered in the challenges by the yellow tribe losing every immunity challenge. When it came time to merge, the surviving members of the blue tribe were not immediately picked off as the yellow tribe's members turned against each other. When only seven competitors remained they competed in an elimination challenge, in which one player was eliminated for cheating and another for coming in last. Eventually, it was blue tribe survivor Tamar Chanturashvili who won the season over Zviad Tavartkiladze by a public vote of 81%.

== Finishing order ==
Contestant	Original Tribes	Merged Tribe	Finish
Tamusia Bibilashvili; 21,	Blue Tribe		1st Voted Out; Day 2
Maria Sarchimelia; 22, Tbilisi	Blue Tribe		2nd Voted Out; Day 3
Nino Kvaratskhelia; 23, Tbilisi	Blue Tribe		3rd Voted Out; Day 5
Mamuka Dundua; 44, Samtredia	Blue Tribe		4th Voted Out; Day 7
Erekle Shonia; 31,	Blue Tribe		5th Voted Out; Day 9
Ekaterine Fangan; 28, Tbilisi	Blue Tribe		6th Voted Out; Day 11
Irakli Dzmistarishvili; 25, Tbilisi	Yellow Tribe	Merge Tribe	7th Voted Out; Day 13
Shalva Melanashvili; 22,	Yellow Tribe	Merge Tribe	8th Voted Out; Day 15
Mariam Karkashadze; 18,	Yellow Tribe	Merge Tribe	9th Voted Out; Day 17
Giorgi Jerenashvili; 29,	Blue Tribe	Merge Tribe	10th Voted Out; Day 19
Dato Shvelidze; 28, Tbilisi	Yellow Tribe	Merge Tribe	Ejected; Day 21
Shorena Janiashvili; 19, Tbilisi	Yellow Tribe	Merge Tribe	Lost Challenge; Day 21
Natia Gobadze; 20, Batumi	Yellow Tribe	Merge Tribe	11th Voted Out; Day 21
Ketevan Katamadze; 27, Kobuleti	Yellow Tribe	Merge Tribe	Lost Challenge; Day 24
Vakho Kakulia; 33, Tbilisi	Blue Tribe	Merge Tribe	Lost Challenge; Day 24
Zviad Tavartkiladze; 27,	Yellow Tribe	Merge Tribe	Runner-Up; Day 26
Tamar Chanturishvili; 26, Tbilisi	Blue Tribe	Merge Tribe	Sole Survivor; Day 26

== Voting history ==
	Original Tribes						Merged Tribe									
Episode #:	1		2	3	4	5	7	8	9	10	11			12-14	Reunion	
Eliminated:	Tamusia; 8/9 votes	Maria; 7/8 votes	Nino; 5/7 votes	Mamuka; 4/6 votes	Erekle; 3/5 votes	Ekaterina; 3/4 votes	Irakli; 7/11 votes	Shalva; 6/10 votes	Mariam; 4/9 votes	Giorgi; 4/7 votes^{1}	Dato; No vote	Shorena; No vote	Natia; 3/5 votes	Vakho; Ketevan; No vote	Zviad; 19% to win	Tamar; 81% to win
Voter	Vote															
Tamar	Tamusia	Maria	Nino	Mamuka	Erekle	Ekaterina	?	?	?	Dato			Natia		Sole Survivor	
Zviad							Irakli	Shalva	?	Giorgi			Natia		Runner-Up	
Vakho	Tamusia	Maria	Nino	Mamuka	Erekle	Ekaterina	?	?	?				Natia			
Ketevan							Irakli	Shalva	?	Giorgi			Vakho			
Natia							Irakli	Shalva	?	Giorgi			Vakho			
Shorena							Irakli	Shalva	?	Dato						
Dato							Irakli	Shalva	?	Giorgi						
Giorgi	Tamusia	Maria	Mamuka	Mamuka	Vakho	Ekaterina	?	?	?	Dato						
Mariam							Irakli	Shalva	?							
Shalva							Irakli	Shorena								
Irakli							?									
Ekaterina	Tamusia	Maria	Nino	Mamuka	Erekle	Vakho										
Erekle	Tamusia	Maria	Nino	Vakho	Vakho											
Mamuka	Tamusia	Maria	Nino	Vakho												
Nino	Tamusia	Maria	Vakho													
Maria	Tamusia	Ekaterina														
Tamusia	Maria															

^1 At the tenth tribal council voting was optional.
