= Kintrishi =

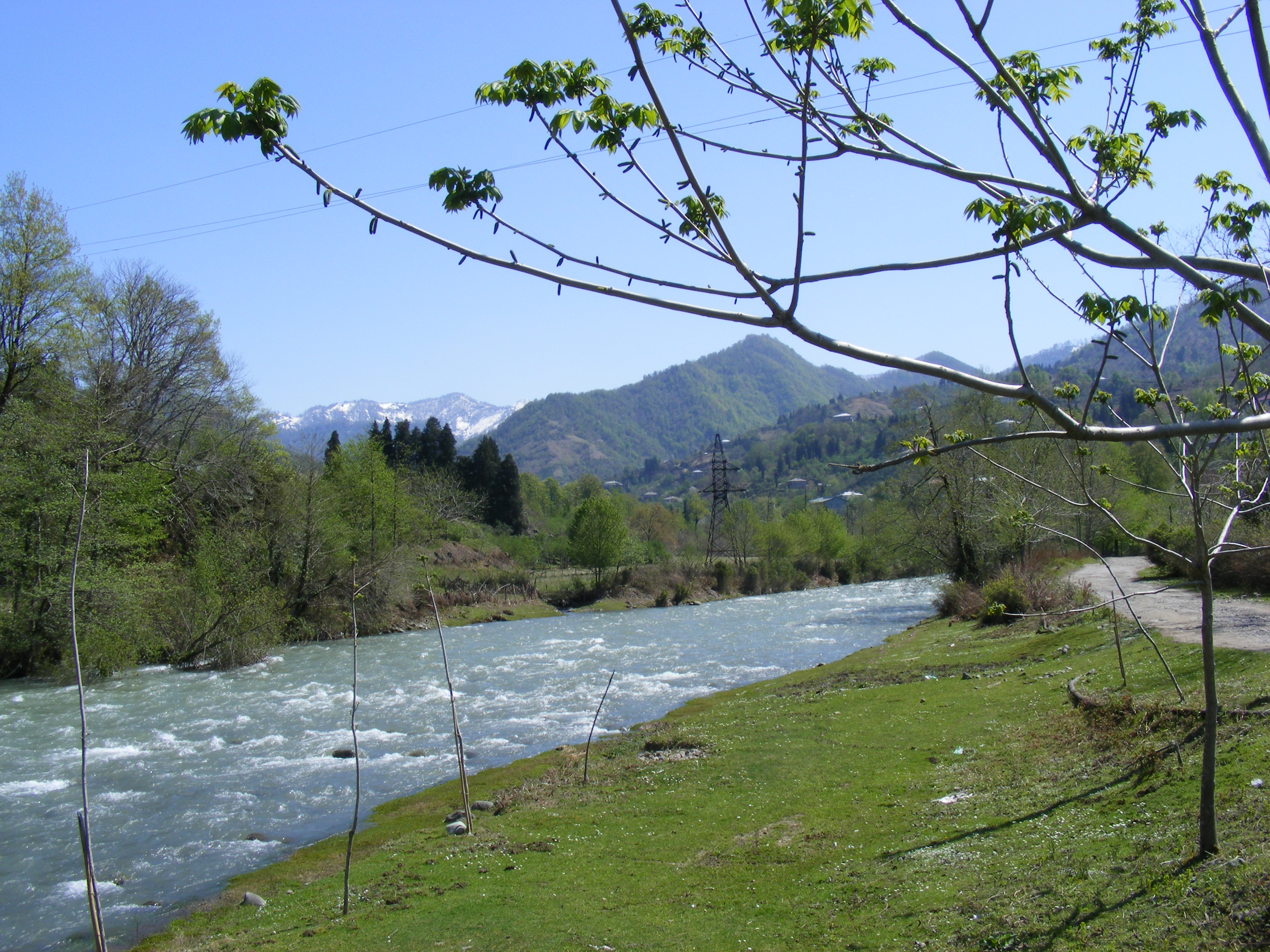
- River Kintrishi at Kobuleti village

Location
- Country: Georgia

Physical characteristics
- Source
  - elevation: 2,599 m (8,527 ft)
- Mouth: Black Sea
  - location: Kobuleti
  - coordinates: 41°48′22″N 41°46′12″E
  - elevation: 0 m (0 ft)
- Length: 45 km (28 mi)
- Basin size: 291 km^{2} (112 sq mi)

The Kintrishi (Georgian: კინტრიში) is a river in the Autonomous Republic of Adjara in southwestern Georgia.

The Kintrishi rises in the Meskheti Range near Mount Khino, at an elevation of 2,599 metres (8,527 ft) above sea level. It flows through the municipality Kobuleti. It flows initially in a westerly direction through the mountains. North of the river is the Kintrishi National Park, south of the Mtirala National Park. The Kintrishi passes the village of Chino and takes on the left tributary of Cherkena. The river then turns north and cuts through a mountain range. Later it turns west again. In the coastal plain it still takes on the Kinkischa on the left side and finally reached on the southern outskirts of Kobuleti by a spit almost completely separated from the Black Sea estuary, in which also flows from the southeast inflowing Dechwa. The Kintrishi has a length of 45 km (28 mi). It drains an area of 291 km^{2} (112 sq mi). Settlements in order from the source:

- Kvirike
- Khutsubani
- Kohi
- Chahati
