= Kobuleti Strict Nature Reserve =

Protected nature area in Georgia (country)

- IUCN category Ia (strict nature reserve)
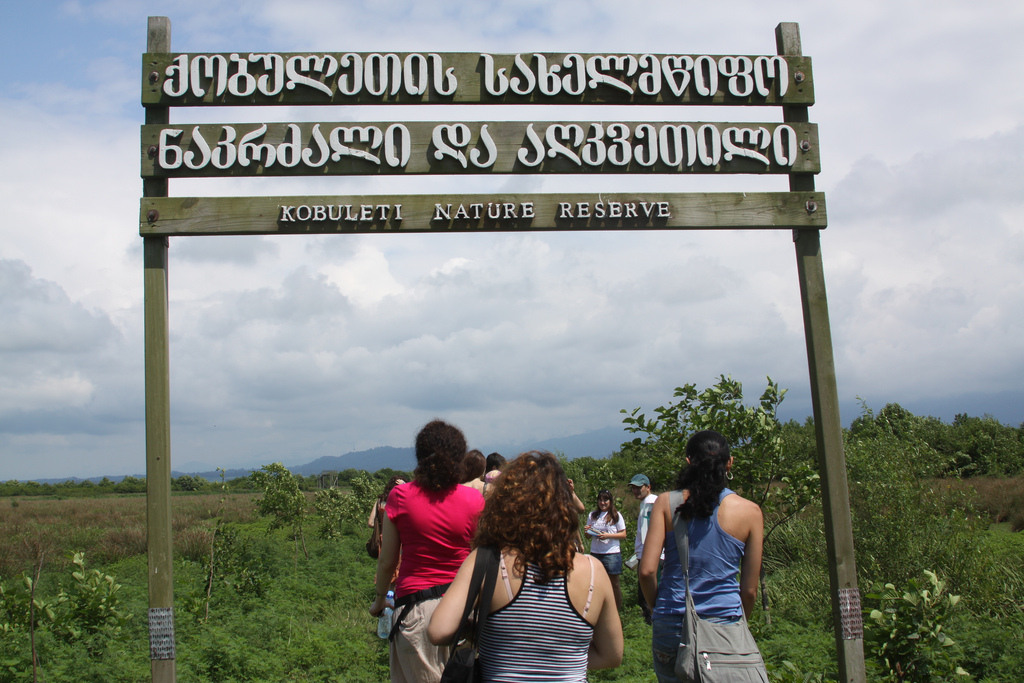
- Entrance into Kobuleti Nature Reserve

- Location within Georgia Location within Adjara
- Location: Georgia
- Nearest city: Kobuleti
- Coordinates: 41°51′47″N 41°48′09″E
- Area: 5.7 km^{2} (2.2 sq mi)
- Established: 1998
- Governing body: Agency of Protected Areas
- Website: Kobuleti Protected Areas Administration

UNESCO World Heritage Site
- Part of: Colchic Rainforests and Wetlands
- Criteria: Natural: ix, x
- Reference: 1616bis-002
- Inscription: 2021 (44th Session)

Kobuleti Strict Nature Reserve (Georgian: ქობულეთის სახელმწიფო ნაკრძალი) is a protected area in Kobuleti Municipality, Adjara region of Georgia along the Black Sea coast in the northern part of the resort town Kobuleti. Kobuleti Protected Areas were established in 1998 to preserve unique wetland ecosystems recognized by the Ramsar Convention. Because of these wetland ecosystems, ancient forests, and the high biodiversity found within the reserve, it was inscribed on the UNESCO World Heritage List as part of the Colchic Rainforests and Wetlands in 2021.

Kobuleti Protected Areas include the Kobuleti Strict Nature Reserve and Kobuleti Managed Reserve, located on the left and right banks of the Shavi Ghele (black creek) river, respectively. Kobuleti Strict Nature Reserve occupies territory bordered by the Togoni River on the north, the Kobuleti—Ozurgeti highway on the east, Shavi Ghele river on the south, and Kobuleti suburbs on the west.

== Geography ==
The reserve has a flat surface with minor erosion by the rivers of Shavi Ghele and Togoni and by a few water drains. It is peat bog which consists mainly of peat moss with hardly noticeable surface elevations, which are called locally peat domes. These minor elevations rise 1–3 m above their surroundings. Bog in this area is composed of a single peat layer with thickness from 5 m up to 9 m.

== Climate ==
The reserve has a humid marine subtropical climate with high relative humidity and periodic strong winds. Because of the influence of the surrounding mountains, the reserve is exceptionally humid, with annual rainfall often exceeding 1500–2500 mm. The primary wet season is during the autumn and winter.

== Flora ==
The Kobuleti Strict Nature Reserve is very rich in plant species. Many of the plants are of boreal origin and appeared here during the Ice Age of the Quaternary period. Most of the area is covered with various peat mosses, in particular a variety of sphagnum species, such as white sphagnum moss and Imeretian sedge (Molinia littoralis), white beak sedge (Rhynchospora alba), Caucasian beak sedge (Rhynchospora caucasica), Great Pond-sedge (Carex riparia), buckbean (Menyanthes trifoliata) and carnivorous round-leaved sundew (Drosera rotundifolia) to name some. Local Colchic plants also grow in peat mires, including Pontic rhododendron (Rhododendron ponticum), Yellow azalea (Rhododendron luteum), climber (Smilax excelsa) and rare, threatened Royal fern (Osmunda regalis).

== Fauna ==
Kobuleti Protected Areas provide habitat for migrating, nesting and wintering water birds, including Gallinago media, which is on the IUCN Red List of Threatened Species, Gallinago gallinago and many others.

Mammals are represented by jackal, Eurasian otter (Lutra lutra), badger, nutria, hare, woodmouse, fieldmouse, et al. Eurasian otter is included in the Red List of Georgia.

Amphibians are represented by common toad, green toad, common tree frog, et al.

Reptiles are represented by Caspian turtle (Mauremys caspica) and marsh turtle, dice snake, grass snake, slow worm, European legless lizard (Pseudopus apodus), striped lizard (Lacerta strigata), common newt, et al.

Ichthyofauna include such species as Northern pike, Crucian carp, European perch and silver eel.

== See also ==
- Kobuleti Managed Reserve
- Kolkheti National Park
