= Shorena Janiashvili =

Georgian singer (born 1988)

- Born: 12 July 1988 (age 37); Tbilisi, Georgia
- Occupation: Singer
- Years active: 2008–present

Shorena Janiashvili (Georgian: შორენა ჯანიაშვილი, Lithuanian: Šorena Džaniašvili or Šorena Janiašvili; born 12 July 1988, in Tbilisi) is a Georgian singer who's currently active in Lithuania.

Janiashvili studied law in Georgia, learned to play piano and guitar but never took formal musical training. She participated in GMiri, the Georgian version of reality show Survivor, where she survived for 40 days on a desert island in Malaysia. After the show she was hired by Imedi TV station. She traveled to Lithuania to host a Georgian TV show Laimės valanda (Hour of Happiness), which would be transmitted from Vilnius to Tbilisi, but the transmission was interrupted by the 2008 South Ossetia war and she stayed in Lithuania.

Janiashvili was a strong supporter of her native country during the war advocating the end of the war. This inspired her to record bilingual song Karas (The War; in Georgian: ომი) which was critical of the authorities. During one of the anti-war protests in front of the Russian embassy, she sang Tavisupleba (Georgian national anthem) and was spotted by a producer from LNK who invited her to participate in Muzikos akademija (Academy of Music), a music competition. She was quickly voted off, but was subsequently invited to another singing competition Žvaigždžių duetai 3 (Star Duets 3), where she was paired up with Stano and took third place. Janiashvili and her partner Deividas Meškauskas won Šok su manim (Dance with Me), a celebrity dance competition on TV3. In 2009, she was awarded the Lithuanian version of Fun Fearless Female of the Year Award by the Cosmopolitan.

In August 2010, Janiashvili released her debut single Tu žinai (You Know). Starting January 2011, she on a solo tour Mano širdies muzika (Music of My Heart) across Lithuania with a program of traditional Georgian songs. In September 2011, she announced a refreshed program and a world music/jazz album in the works.
