= Stano (singer) =

Lithuanian singer (born 1981)

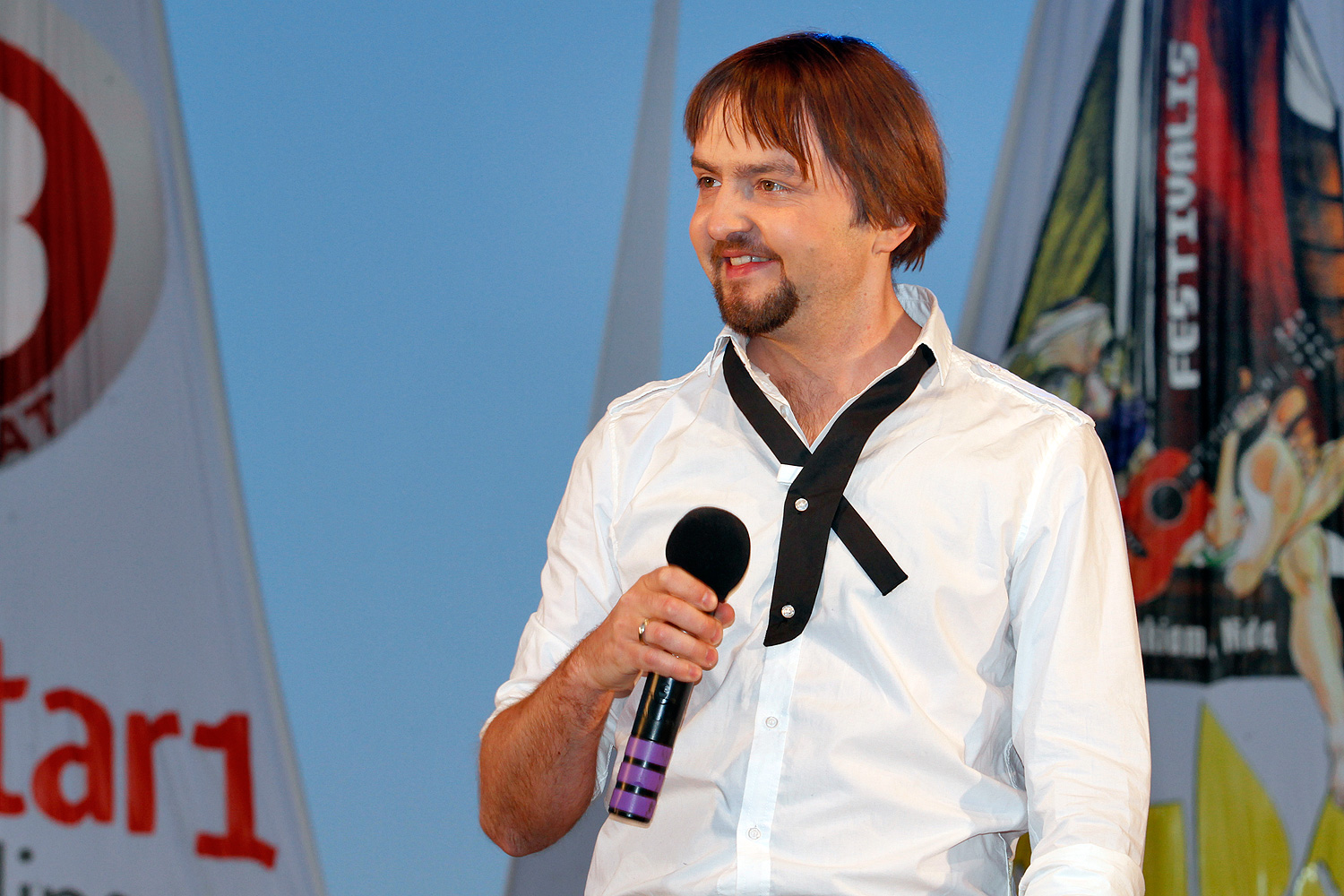
- Stavickis during his performance in 2010

Background information
- Also known as: Stano; Stanislavas Stavickis
- Born: Stanislav Stavitsky; 25 November 1981 (age 44); Sochi, Russian SFSR, USSR
- Origin: Vilnius, Lithuania
- Genres: Pop
- Occupations: Singer; songwriter; author
- Instruments: Vocals; guitar
- Years active: 2000–present
- Member of: Delfinai

Stano (born Stanislav Stavitsky, Russian: Станислав Ставицкий, Lithuanian: Stanislavas Stavickis; 25 November 1981) is a Russian-Lithuanian singer, songwriter, and author. He is the frontman of the musical group Delfinai. Stavickis has also written two novels, autobiographical Kiek kainuoja ilgesys (How Much Does Longing Cost, 2004), and Neįtikėtinos istorijos (Unbelievable Stories, 2008).

Stavickis was born to a Russian mother and a Lithuanian father. He came to Lithuania in 1992 to study at the Vilnius Secondary School "Lietuvių namai" (now known as Vilnius lietuvių namai), designed for students of Lithuanian heritage from foreign countries. Here he met Viačeslavas Saninas (DJ Sweetas, keyboard) and they established band called Delfinai (dolphins) in 2000. Their debut album Svajonės (Dreams) sold 11,000 copies in nine days and was certified gold. When preparing the album one song was lost due to a computer glitch, Stavickis created another song Viskas bus gerai (Everything is Going to Be Alright), which reached the peak spot at M-1 Top 40 chart. Delfinai received Bravo Awards as Debut of the Year. In 2003, DJ Sweetas left Delfinai to study and work in Russia. Even though Stavickis kept the band name, he in essence continued solo career. Along with Alanas Chošnau and SKAMP, Delfinai warmed up a free concert by The Black Eyed Peas in Vingis Park sponsored by mobile operator Tele2 on May 30, 2005.

In 2002, Stavickis came in second in Akvariumas-2, a celebrity reality show inspired by Big Brother. In 2005, Delfinai took second place in Nacionalinė muzikos lyga (NML), a reality competition by famous musicians. In 2009, Stavickis with Georgian singer Shorena Janiashvili won 3rd place in Žvaigždžių duetai, a reality competitions of musical duos.

== Albums ==
- Svajonės (2001)
- Dangus (2002)
- Krantas (2003)
- Vėjas (2004)
- Kai tu šalia (2004)
- Ačiū tau (2006)
- Dabar ir čia (2007)
