= Kobuleti Managed Reserve =

Protected nature area in Georgia

- Georgian: ქობულეთის აღკვეთილი
- IUCN category IV (habitat/species management area)
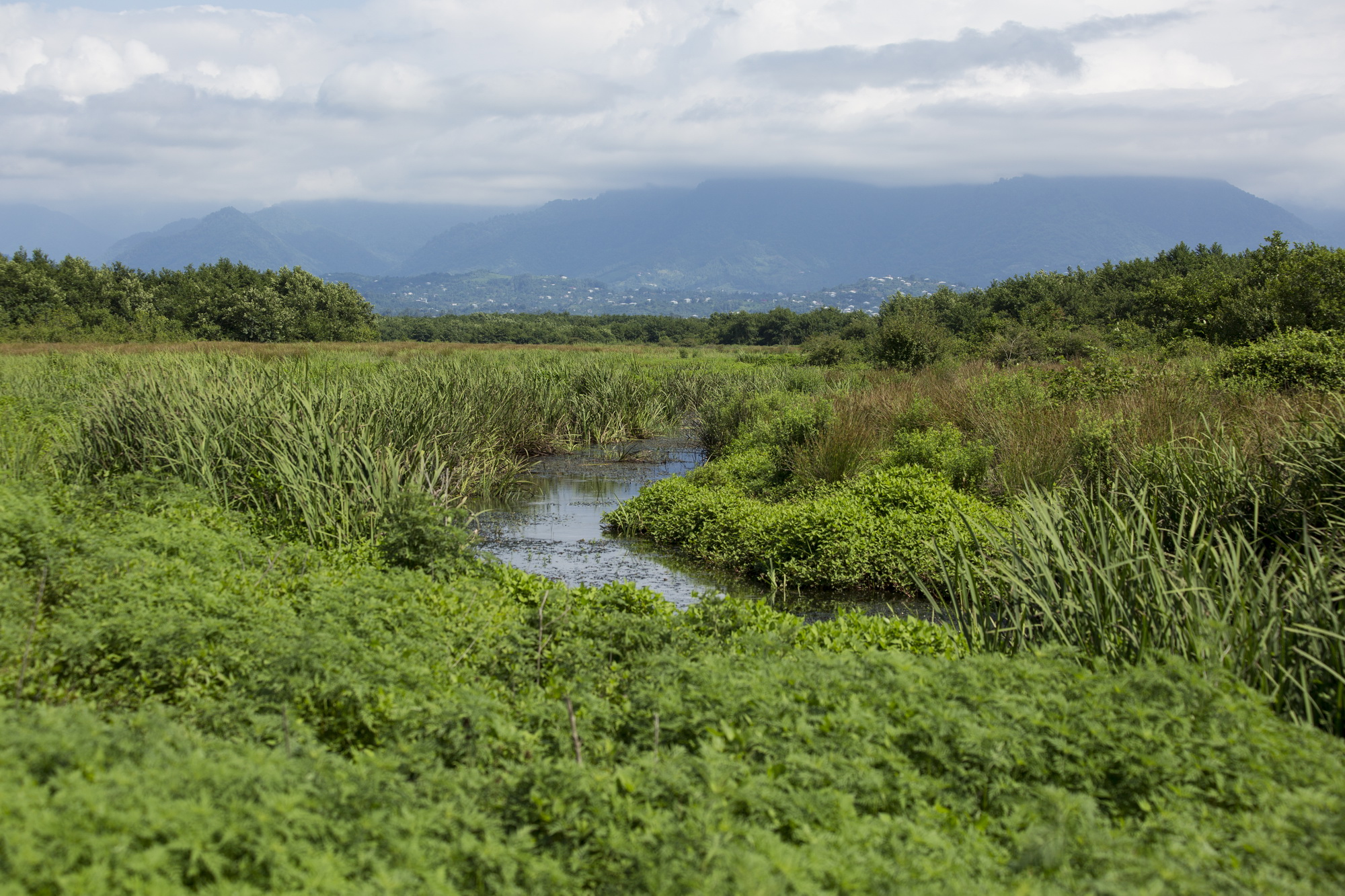
- Kobuleti Managed Reserve

- Location within Georgia Location within Adjara
- Location: Georgia
- Nearest city: Kobuleti
- Coordinates: 41°51′17″N 41°47′49″E
- Area: 1,085 acres (4.39 km^{2})
- Established: 1998
- Governing body: Agency of Protected Areas
- Website: Kobuleti Protected Areas Administration

Kobuleti Managed Reserve (Georgian: ქობულეთის აღკვეთილი) is a protected area in Kobuleti Municipality, Adjara region of Georgia along the Black Sea coast in the northern part of the resort town Kobuleti. Kobuleti Protected Areas were established in 1998 to preserve unique wetland ecosystems recognized by the Ramsar Convention.

Kobuleti Protected Areas include Kobuleti Managed Reserve and Kobuleti Strict Nature Reserve located on left and right banks of Shavi Ghele (black creek) river respectively.

== Geography ==
Reserve has flat surface with minor erosion by the rivers of Shavi Ghele and Togoni and by a few water drains. It is apeat bog, consisting mainly of peat moss with hardly noticeable surface elevations which are called locally peat domes. These minor elevations rise 1–3 m above it surroundings. The bog in this area is composed of a single peat layer with thickness from 5 m up to 9 m.

== History and culture ==
Kabuleti is an ancient cultural and trading center with many tourist attractions. In late antiquity major trading routes where crisscrossing in Kobuleti. Christianity was introduced here by St. Andrew the Apostle in the 1st century.

Since the 1950s local population started building sophisticated houses with huge stairs and balconies. The size of the house was indicative to well-being of the family and represented major investment. Villages around Kobuleti till present day has examples of traditional Achara and Lazeti dwellings. In vicinity of Kobuleti there are ruins of castles and bridges from Early Middle Ages.

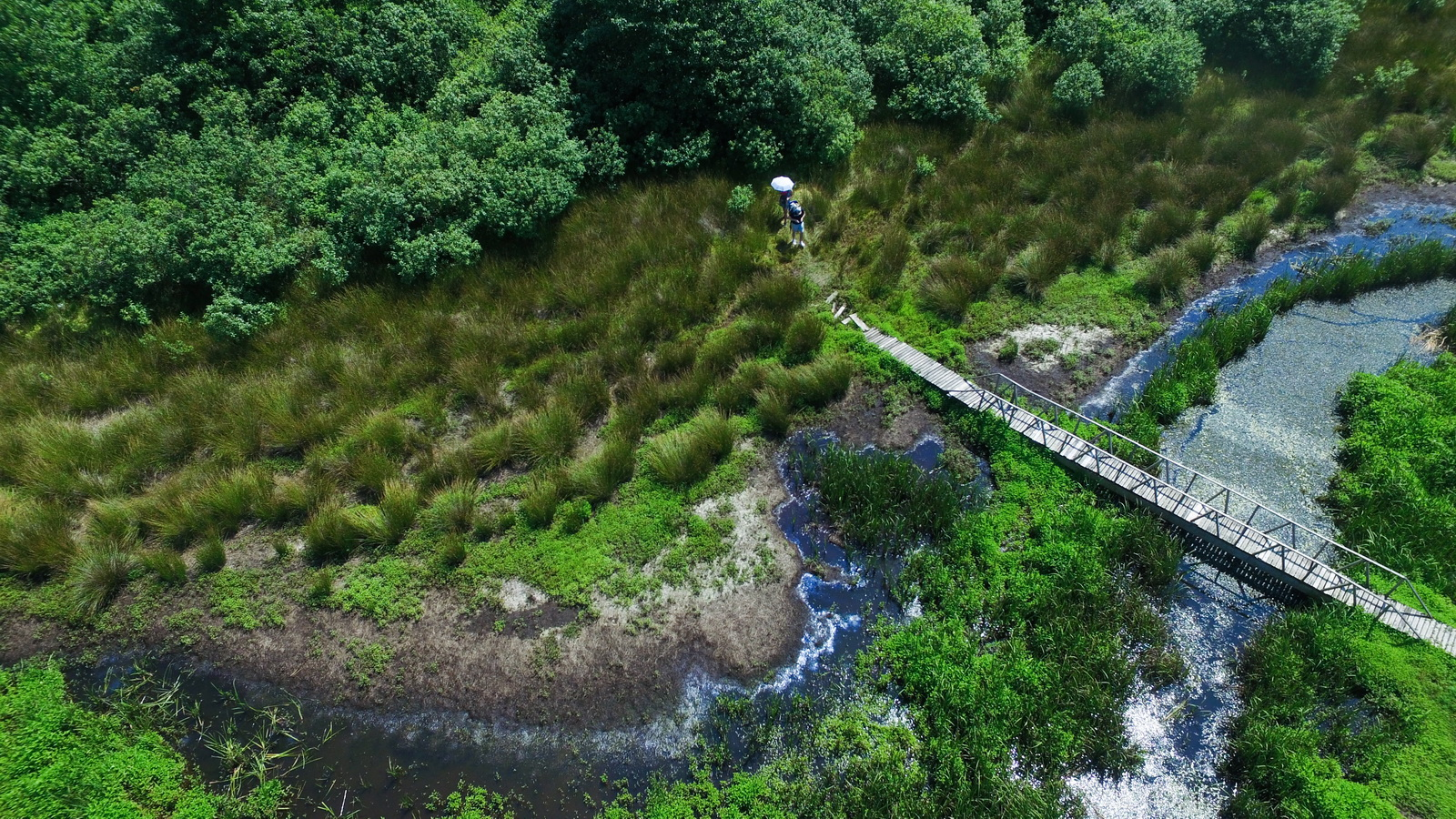
Pedestrian bridge across the Shavi Ghele (black creek) river.

== Tourist attraction ==
Kobuleti Managed Reserve arranged trails, so that visitors can carry out educational tours. It is possible to rent skis and walk along sphagnum bog.

== See also ==
- Kobuleti Strict Nature Reserve
