= Vilniaus lietuvių namai =

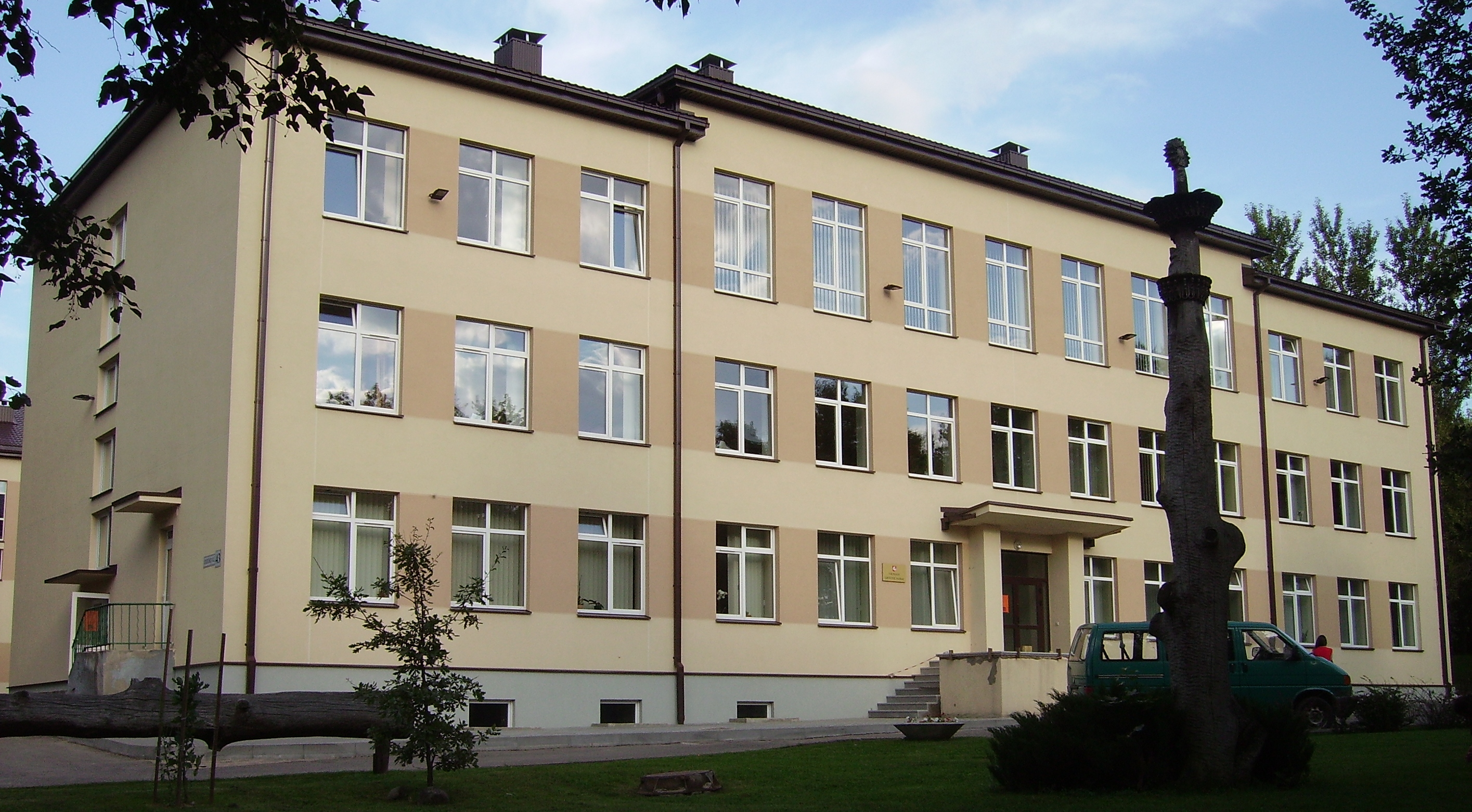

Location
- Dzūkų g. 43; Vilnius; Lithuania
- Coordinates: 54°39′49″N 25°17′10″E

Information
- School type: Gymnasium
- Established: 1990
- Founder: Darius Kuolys
- Principal: Gintautas Rudzinskas
- Grades: 1–12
- Enrollment: 280
- Colours: Green and Gold
- Website: www.lietuviunamai.lt

Vilniaus lietuvių namai is a Lithuanian gymnasium, located in Naujininkai, a southern neighborhood of Vilnius, Lithuania.

== History ==
On April 24, 1990, Lithuania's Minister of Education and Culture Darius Kuolys signed an order to establish a Lithuanian school for children of Lithuanian heritage who have returned from foreign countries. The first lessons were held on October 1, 1990. The majority of students come from Russia and Poland, while there are also students from the United States, Kazakhstan and various other countries. A substantial portion of the students are the ancestors of Lithuanians who were exiled to Siberia after the 1940 Soviet Invasion of Lithuania.

== Notable alumni ==
- Stano (Stanislovas Stavickis), musician and leader of Delfinai
