= Bagrati Cathedral =

11th-century cathedral in Kutaisi, Georgia

Bagrati Cathedral ბაგრატის ტაძარი
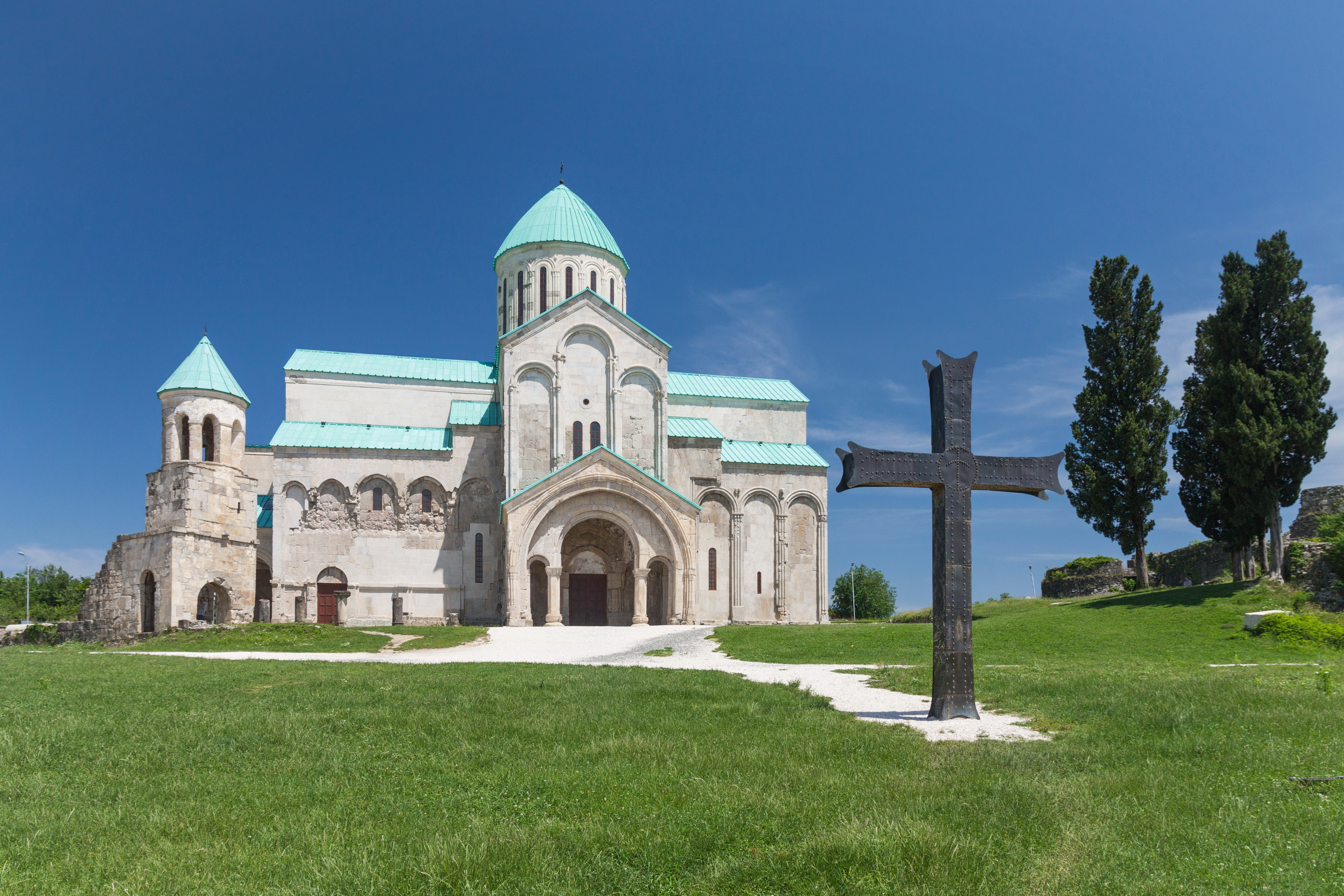
- Bagrati Cathedral in 2014

- Location within Georgia

Religion
- Affiliation: Georgian Orthodox Church

Location
- Location: Kutaisi, Imereti, Georgia
- Coordinates: 42.2773°N 42.7043°E

Architecture
- Type: Church
- Style: Georgian
- Completed: 11th century
- Dome: 1, rebuilt
- UNESCO World Heritage Site
- Official name: Bagrati Cathedral and Gelati Monastery
- Type: Cultural
- Criteria: iv
- Designated: 1994 (18th session)
- Delisted: 2017
- Reference no.: 710
- UNESCO Region: Europe and North America
- Immovable Cultural Monument of National Significance of Georgia
- Official name: Bagrati Cathedral
- Designated: November 7, 2006; 19 years ago
- Reference no.: 591
- Item Number in Cultural Heritage Portal: 9897
- Date of entry in the registry: October 3, 2007; 18 years ago

The Cathedral of the Dormition, or the Kutaisi Cathedral, more commonly known as Bagrati Cathedral (Georgian: ბაგრატი; ბაგრატის ტაძარი, or Bagratis tadzari), is an 11th-century cathedral in the city of Kutaisi, in the Imereti region of Georgia. A masterpiece of medieval Georgian architecture, the cathedral suffered heavy damage throughout centuries and was reconstructed to its present state through a gradual process starting in the 1950s, with controversial conservation works concluding in 2012. These works prompted UNESCO to include the cathedral on its list of endangered World Heritage Sites, and then to remove the church from the World Heritage list.

A distinct landmark in the scenery of central Kutaisi, the cathedral rests on the Ukimerioni Hill.

== History ==
Bagrati Cathedral was built in the early years of the 11th century, during the reign of King Bagrat III, due to which it was called "Bagrati", i.e., Bagrat's cathedral. An inscription on the north wall reveals that the floor was laid in "chronicon 223", i.e., 1003. In 1692, it was devastated by a cannonball shot by Ottoman troops who had invaded the Kingdom of Imereti. The incident caused the cupola and ceiling to collapse.

William Lethaby called it "the finest of Georgian monuments".

Conservation and restoration works, as well as archaeological studies at the cathedral began in the 1950s under the leadership of a Georgian architect Vakhtang Tsintsadze. The restoration works headed by Tsintsadze were divided into six stages and continued for several decades through 1994. That same year in 1994 Bagrati Cathedral, together with the Gelati Monastery, was included in UNESCO's World Heritage Site list as a single entity. In 2001, ownership of the cathedral was transferred from the Georgian state to the Georgian Orthodox Church. Officially, the cathedral is dedicated to the Dormition of the Mother of God and holds its main feast day on Mariamoba. It is currently the cathedral seat of the Metropolitan of Kutaisi. There are regular religious services. There is a monastery on the grounds, and the hieromonks serve as cathedral clergy. It is a very popular location for weddings among the locals. It is also frequently used as a symbol of the city of Kutaisi, being one of its main tourist attractions.

== Present state and conservation issues ==
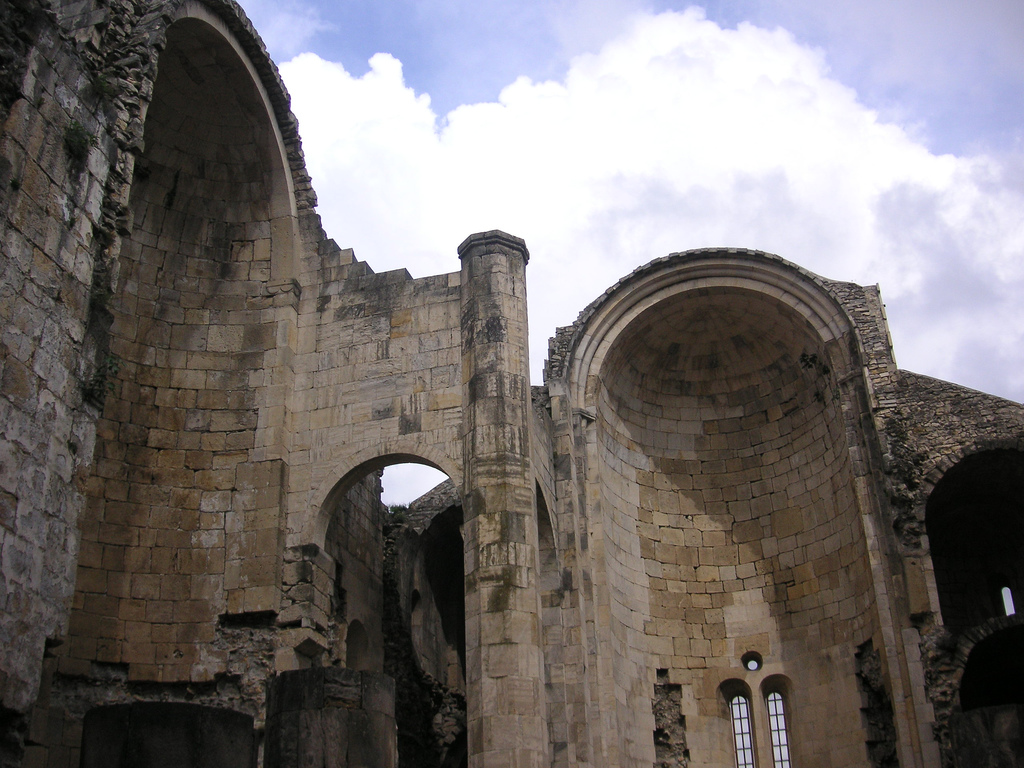
Pre-restoration eastern wall of the Bagrati Cathedral seen in 2005 with its ceiling still collapsed

In July 2010 UNESCO added Bagrati Cathedral to its List of World Heritage in Danger in part because of the continuing reconstruction, which it feared would affect the structural integrity and authenticity of the site. Even before the reconstruction works, in 2008 ICOMOS was concerned about the deteriorating state of Bagrati, but it commended that any conservation efforts by the Government should not include a type of reconstruction which would affect the site's historical value. In 2011 UNESCO urged the Georgian government authorities to develop a rehabilitation strategy that would reverse some of the changes made to the site in recent years, but it acknowledged that these alterations may be "almost irreversible". In 2013, architect Andrea Bruno was awarded a Georgian state gold medal for his role in the Bagrati Cathedral reconstruction and was subsequently recognized for this project with the University of Ferrara Domus International Prize for Restoration and Conservation.

The restoration works of the cathedral were heavily criticized by UNESCO as "detrimental to its integrity and authenticity". In 2017, while Gelati Monastery was removed from UNESCO's List of World Heritage in Danger and retained its World Heritage Site status, Bagrati Cathedral's World Heritage status was removed.

== Burials ==
- George I of Georgia

== See also ==
- Gelati Monastery
- World Heritage Sites in Georgia
- World Heritage Sites in Danger
