= Meskheti Range =

Mountain range in southwestern Georgia

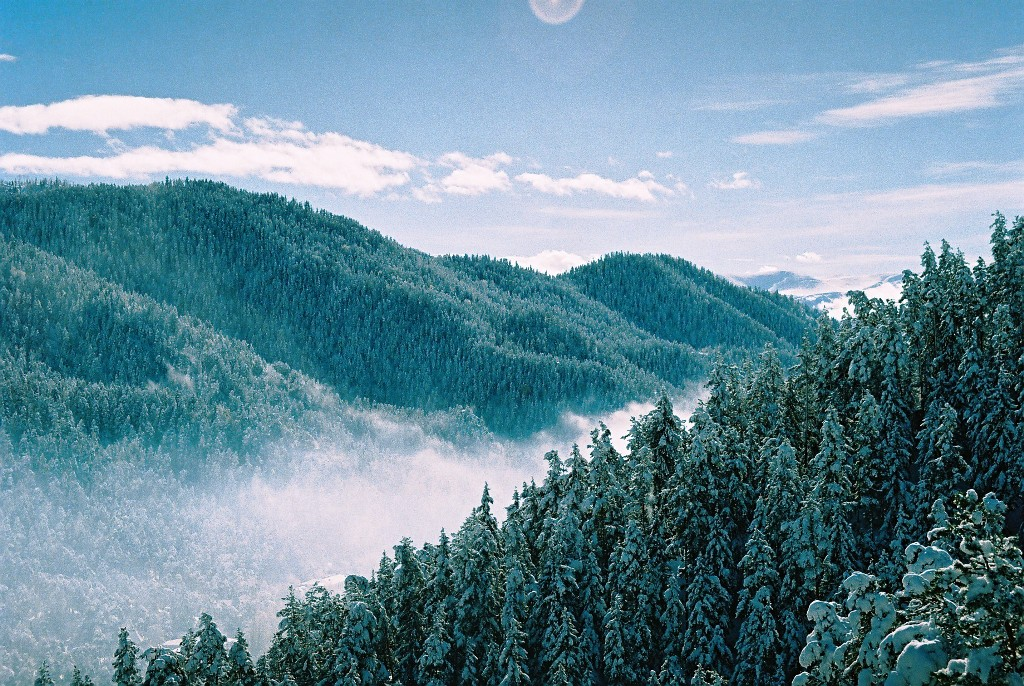
- View of Meskheti Range near Abastumani, Georgia

Highest point
- Peak: Mount Mepistskharo
- Elevation: 2,850 m (9,350 ft)

Dimensions
- Length: 150 km (93 mi)

Geography
- Location within Samtskhe-Javakheti Location within Imereti Location within Georgia
- Country: Georgia
- Range coordinates: 41°50′26″N 42°39′47″E
- Parent range: Caucasus Mountains

Meskheti Range (Georgian: მესხეთის ქედი) (Meskh/Meskhet/Meskhetian Range, Adzhar-Imereti Range, Achara-Imereti Range Adzhar-Akhaltsikh Range also Moschian Mountains) is a part of the Lesser Caucasus mountain range in Meskheti region, in southwestern Georgia.

== Geography ==
The length of the range is 150 km and the highest point is Mount Mepistskharo at an elevation of 2,850 m above sea level. The Meskheti Range is characterized by high amounts of precipitation. The territory around Mt. Mtirala (the Ajarian section of the range) was the wettest region within the Soviet Union and is the most humid area of the Caucasus with an annual precipitation of approximately 4500mm/year (180 inches/year). Several rivers are flowing from the Meskheti Range — Supsa, Acharis-Tsqali and Natanebi.

== Flora and fauna ==
The slopes of the Meskheti Range are rich in endemic and relic species and mainly covered by deciduous forests (oak, chestnut, maple, hornbeam, beech) below 1,200 m above sea level and by coniferous forests (spruce, fir and in some cases pine) from 1,200 to 1,800 m. The highest regions of the range are covered by sub-alpine and alpine meadows.

Strabo mentions the Moschian Mountains as joining the Caucasus. (Geography, 11.2.1)

14% of Meskheti range territory is included in three Georgian national parks — Borjomi-Kharagauli, Kintrishi and Mtirala national parks.
