= Euxine–Colchic broadleaf forests =

Ecoregion in Turkey

Euxine-Colchic broadleaf forests
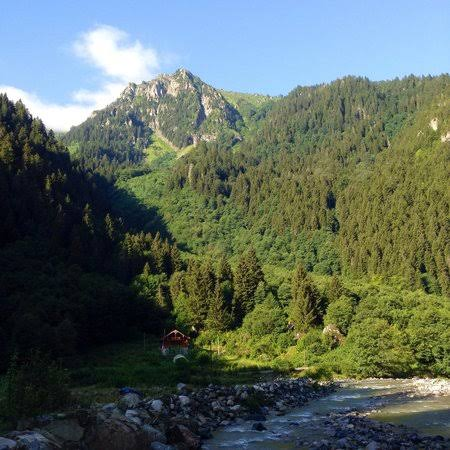
- Rize province, Turkey

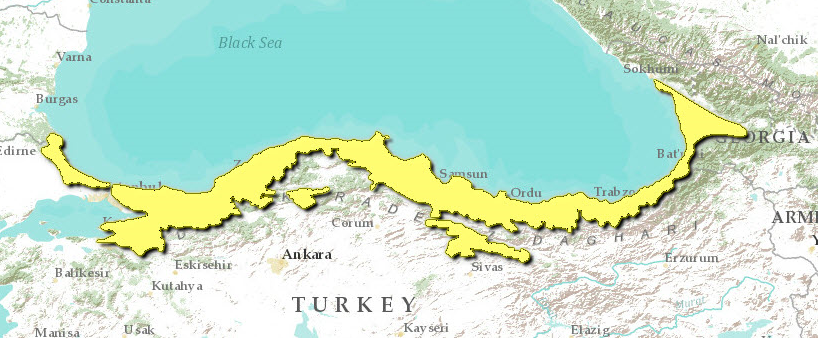
- Euxine-Colchic deciduous forests ecoregion along the southern coast of Black Sea, shown in yellow.

Ecology
- Realm: Palearctic
- Biome: temperate broadleaf and mixed forests
- Borders: List: Aegean and Western Turkey sclerophyllous and mixed forests; Balkan mixed forests; Caucasus mixed forests; Northern Anatolian conifer and deciduous forests; Anatolian conifer and deciduous mixed forests

Geography
- Area: 73,828 km^{2} (28,505 sq mi)
- Countries: Bulgaria; Georgia; Turkey

Conservation
- Conservation status: Critical/endangered
- Protected: 784 km^{2} (1%)

The Euxine–Colchic broadleaf forests is an ecoregion of temperate broadleaf and mixed forests along the southern shore of the Black Sea. The ecoregion extends along the thin coastal strip from the southeastern corner of Bulgaria in the west, across the northern coast of Turkey, to Georgia in the east, where it wraps around the eastern end of the Black Sea.

== Sub-regions ==
The ecoregion is divided into two sub-regions, chiefly based on the amount of precipitation.

The understory of evergreen broadleaf shrubs is characteristic for both sub-regions. Notable species in the understory include various rhododendrons such as Pontic rhododendron (Rhododendron ponticum); Black Sea holly (Ilex colchica), cherry laurel (Prunus laurocerasus), Caucasus (Buxus colchica) and common box (Buxus sempervirens), Caucasian whortleberry (Vaccinium arctostaphylos) etc. From a European perspective, the majority of these count as relict species from the Tertiary period.

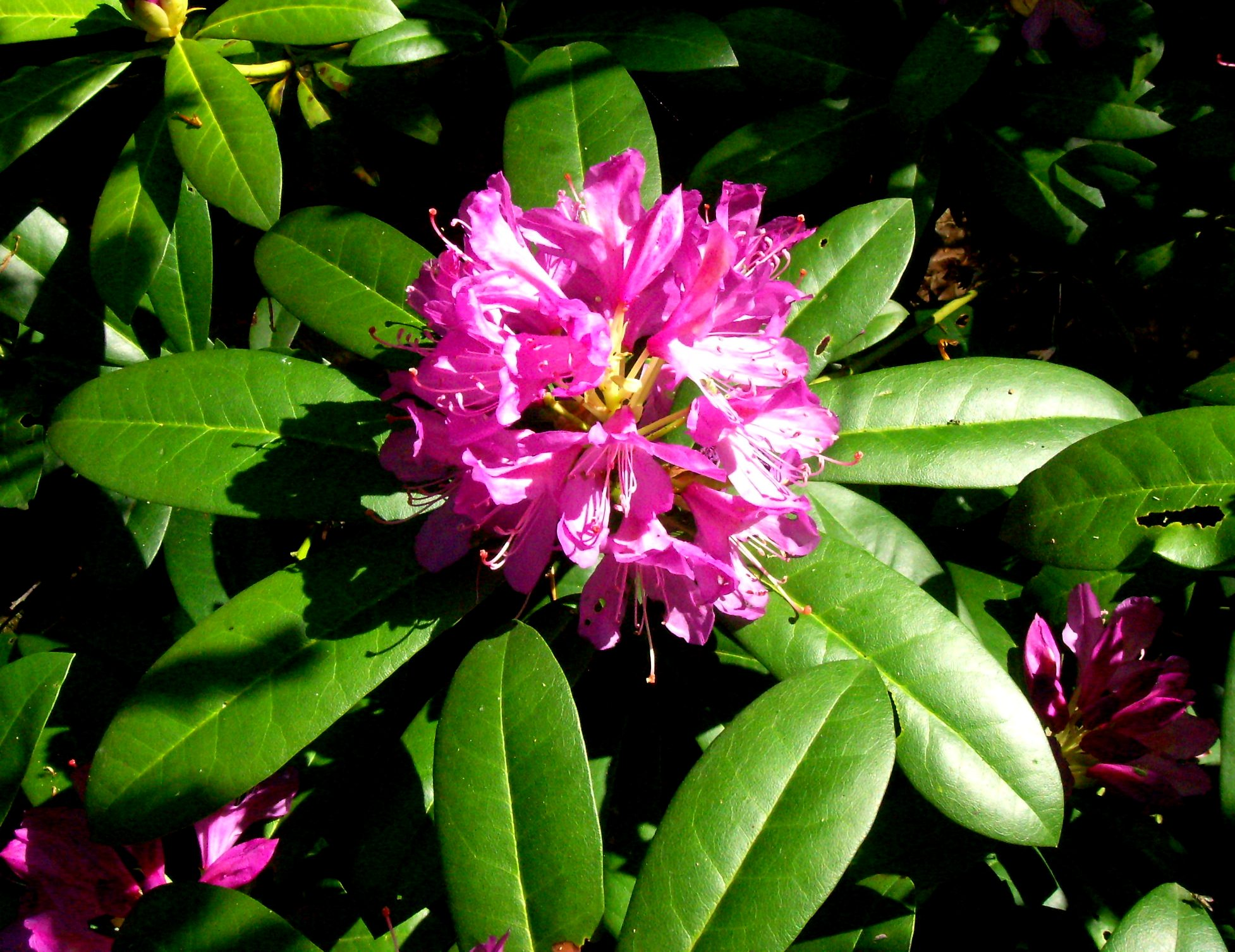
An understory of evergreen shrubs like the Pontic rhododendron is characteristic for the Euxine-Colchic deciduous forests ecoregion

=== Colchian forests ===
The Colchic or Colchian forests are found around the southeast corner of the Black Sea in Turkey and Georgia in and around the Machakhela National Park. The Colchian forests are mixed, with deciduous black alder (Alnus glutinosa), hornbeam (Carpinus betulus and C. orientalis), Oriental beech (Fagus orientalis), and sweet chestnut (Castanea sativa), together with evergreen Nordmann fir (Abies nordmanniana), Caucasian spruce (Picea orientalis) and Scots pine (Pinus sylvestris). Platanus orientalis is also found in these areas. The vegetation is diverse and varies with elevation.

The Colchic region has high rainfall, averaging 1,500–2,500 millimetres (59–98 inches) annually, with a maximum in excess of 4000 mm, and is home to some of Europe's temperate rainforests.

A 2023 study suggested that deforestation has resulted in more flooding and landslides in the region.

=== Euxinic forests ===
The drier Euxine or Euxinic forests lie west of the Melet River, which meets the Black Sea in the city of Ordu, and extend across the Bosporus along the Black Sea coast of European Turkey to Bulgaria.

The Euxine forests receive an average of 1000 to 1500 mm precipitation annually.

The Bulgarian part of the ecoregion lies within Strandzha Nature Park, where it borders on and transitions into the Balkan mixed forests ecoregion. Rare habitat types include coastal sand dunes and peatlands.

== Fauna ==
Large mammals native to the ecoregion include lynx (Lynx lynx), brown bear (Ursus arctos), Caucasian red deer (Cervus elaphus maral), roe deer (Capreolus capreolus), wild boar (Sus scrofa), and golden jackal (Canis aureus).

The ecoregion is habitat for many migrating, wintering, and breeding birds. It is on a bird migratory pathway known as the Black Sea-Eastern Mediterranean flyway, which connects Scandinavia and Western Russia to the Mediterranean Sea and Africa. Water birds found in the ecoregion include the eastern imperial eagle (Aquila heliaca), Dalmatian pelican (Pelecanus crispus), great white pelican (Pelecanus onocrotalus), pygmy cormorant (Microcarbo pygmaeus), white-headed duck (Oxyura leucocephala), ferruginous duck (Aythya nyroca), red-crested pochard (Netta rufina), black stork (Ciconia nigra), white stork (C. ciconia), common crane (Grus grus), demoiselle crane (Grus virgo), greater flamingo (Phoenicopterus roseus), and Bewick's swan (Cygnus columbianus bewickii).

== Protected areas ==
Much woodland has been converted to arable land to grow crops such as hazelnut, tea, citrus fruit, and bamboo. A 2017 assessment found that 784 square kilometres (303 square miles), or 1%, of the ecoregion is in protected areas. Protected areas include the Strandzha Nature Park in Bulgaria and the Machakhela National Park, Mtirala National Park, and the Kintrishi Protected Landscape in Georgia. In 2021, the Georgian protected areas were inscribed on the UNESCO World Heritage List as part of the Colchic Rainforests and Wetlands site, because of the biodiversity and distinctiveness of the Colchic forests.

There are RAMSAR wetlands in the Kolkheti National Park and the Kızılırmak Delta.
