= Kobuleti =

Kobuleti ქობულეთი
- Town
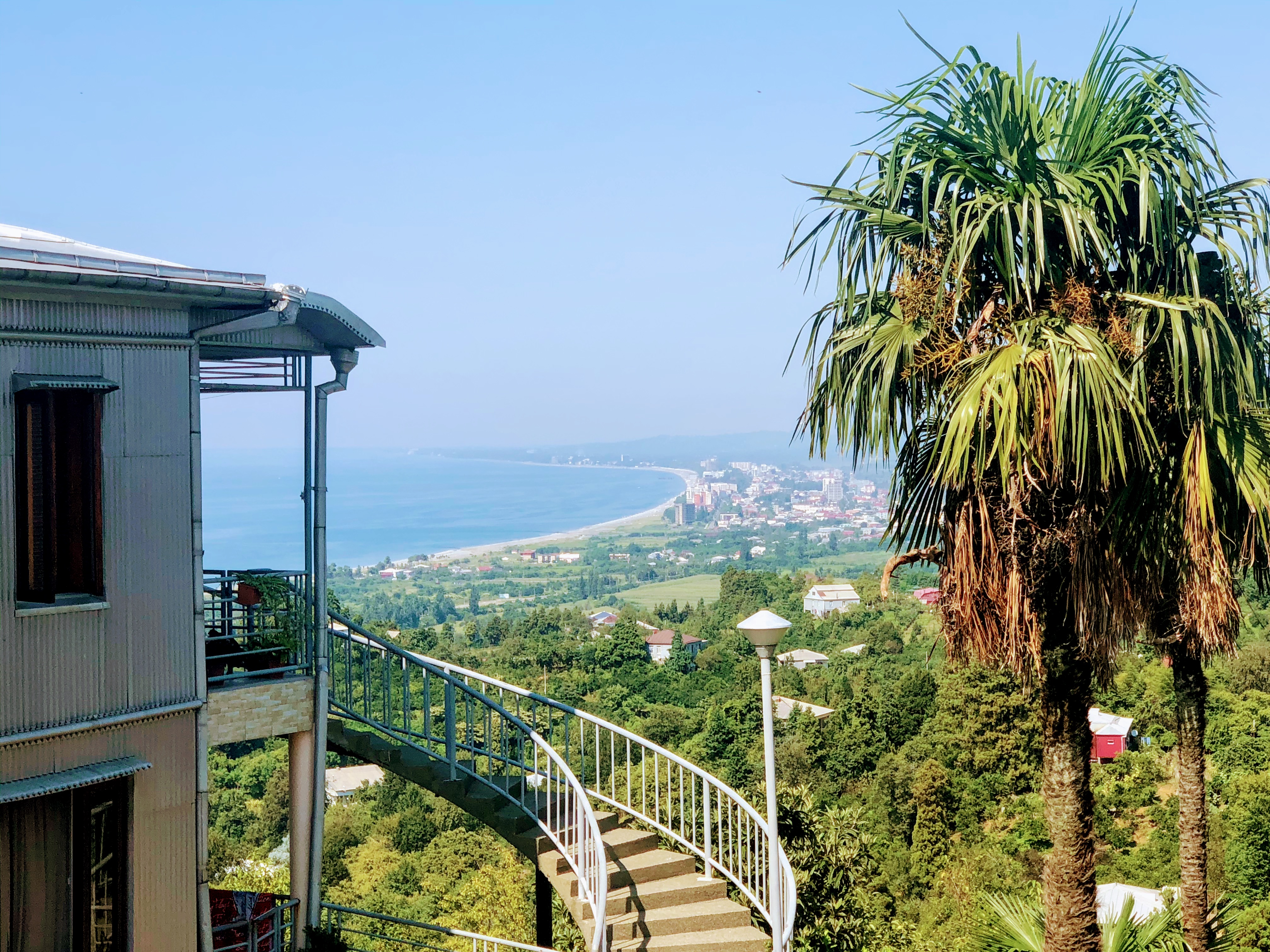
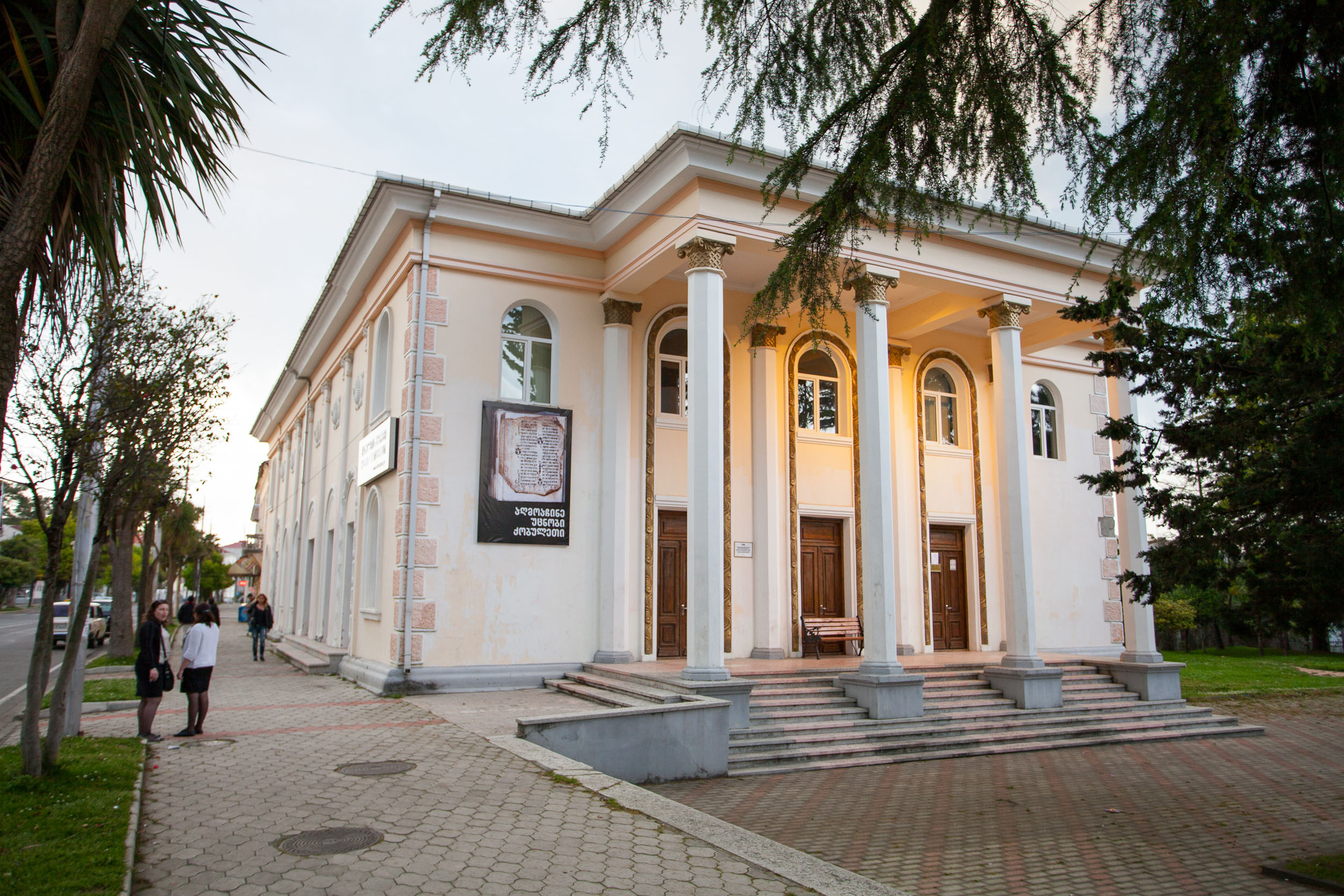
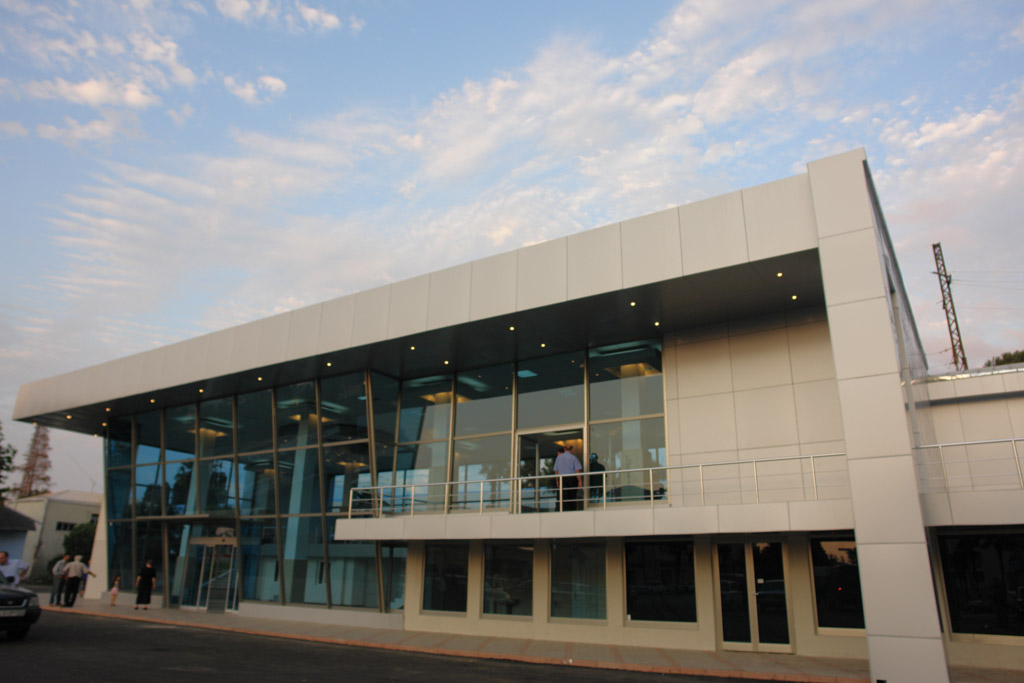
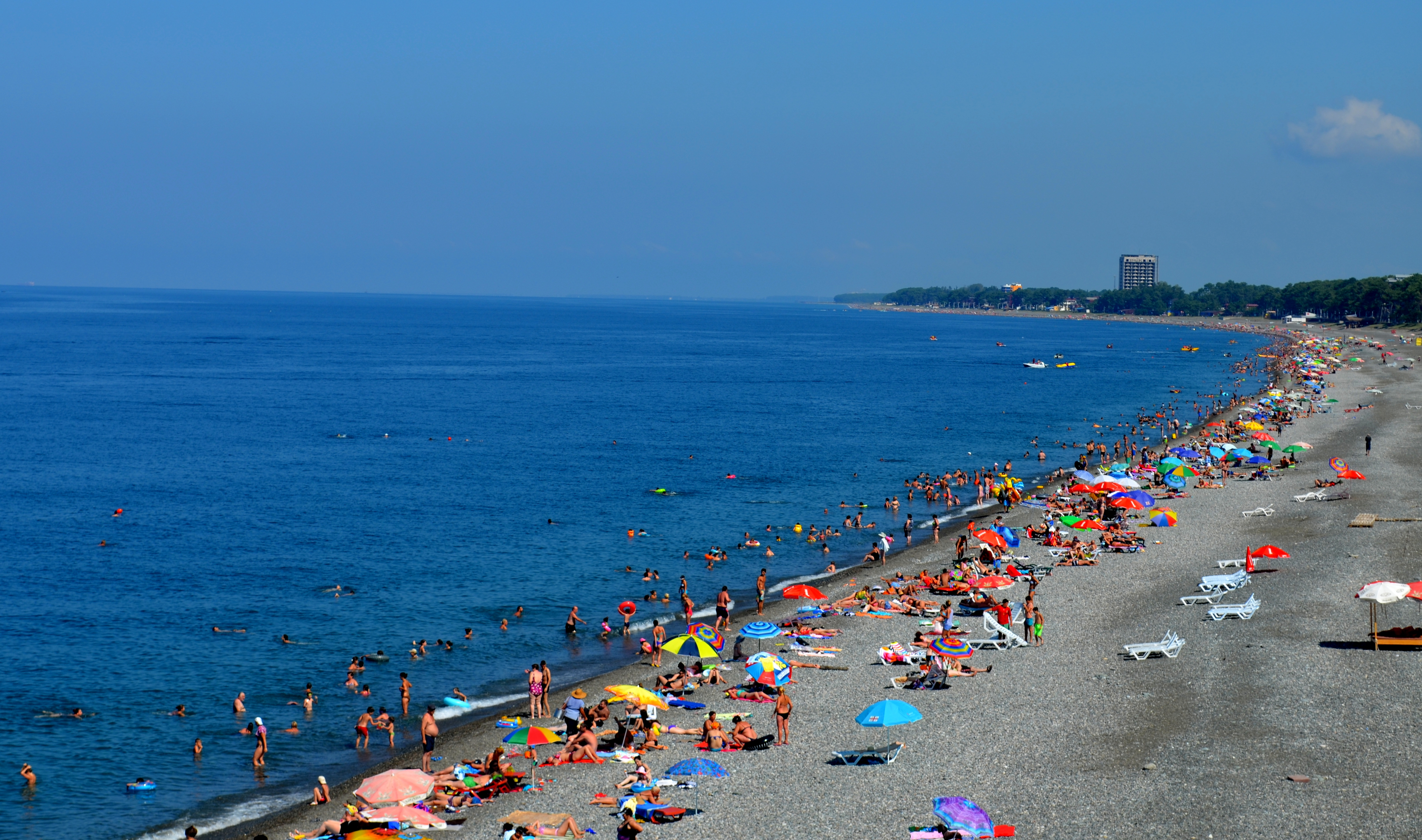
- Viewed from Tsikhisdziri Kobuleti Museum Kobuleti Train Station Kobuleti Beach

- Location within Georgia Location within Adjara
- Coordinates: 41°48′40″N 41°46′31″E
- Country: Georgia
- Autonomous Republic: Adjara
- Municipality: Kobuleti
- City from: 1944

Area
  - Total: 15 km^{2} (5.8 sq mi)
- Elevation: 10 m (33 ft)

Population (2020)
  - Total: 27,546
  - Density: 1,103/km^{2} (2,860/sq mi)
- Time zone: UTC+4 (Georgian Time)
- Website: www.visitkobuleti.com

Kobuleti (Georgian: ქობულეთი, pronounced [ˈkʰobuletʰi]) is a resort town in Adjara, western Georgia, situated on the eastern coast of the Black Sea. It is the seat of Kobuleti Municipality and a seaside resort.

== Geography ==
The city of Kobuleti is situated in the south-western part of Georgia, i.e. the northern part of the Autonomous Republic of Ajara. It borders with Ozurgeti Region to the north. The Regional centre is Kobuleti City, which stretches along the Black Sea shore. It is located 28 km away from the Adjaran capital of Batumi.

After the civil wars of 1990–1993, the once sophisticated sanatoriums remained abandoned and plundered until 2004. Kobuleti has since developed into an upscale tourist center, being especially popular among ethnic Armenians.

The Kintrishi and Tikeri reserve areas are unique with their bio-diversity. One can find rare flora in the Ispani marsh.

The surrounding region has diverse soil: seashore lowland is rich in peatbog soil. There are alpine rocks in the highlands, red soil is found in the hill areas. The mountainous area is good for subtropical species.

Kobuleti has several rivers. The most important ones are the Kintrishi River, the Chakvistskali River, the Acharistskali River, the Ochkhamuri River, the Achkva River, and the Dekhva River. The town is also home to the Kintrishi Protected Landscape and Kobuleti Managed Reserve.

=== Climate ===
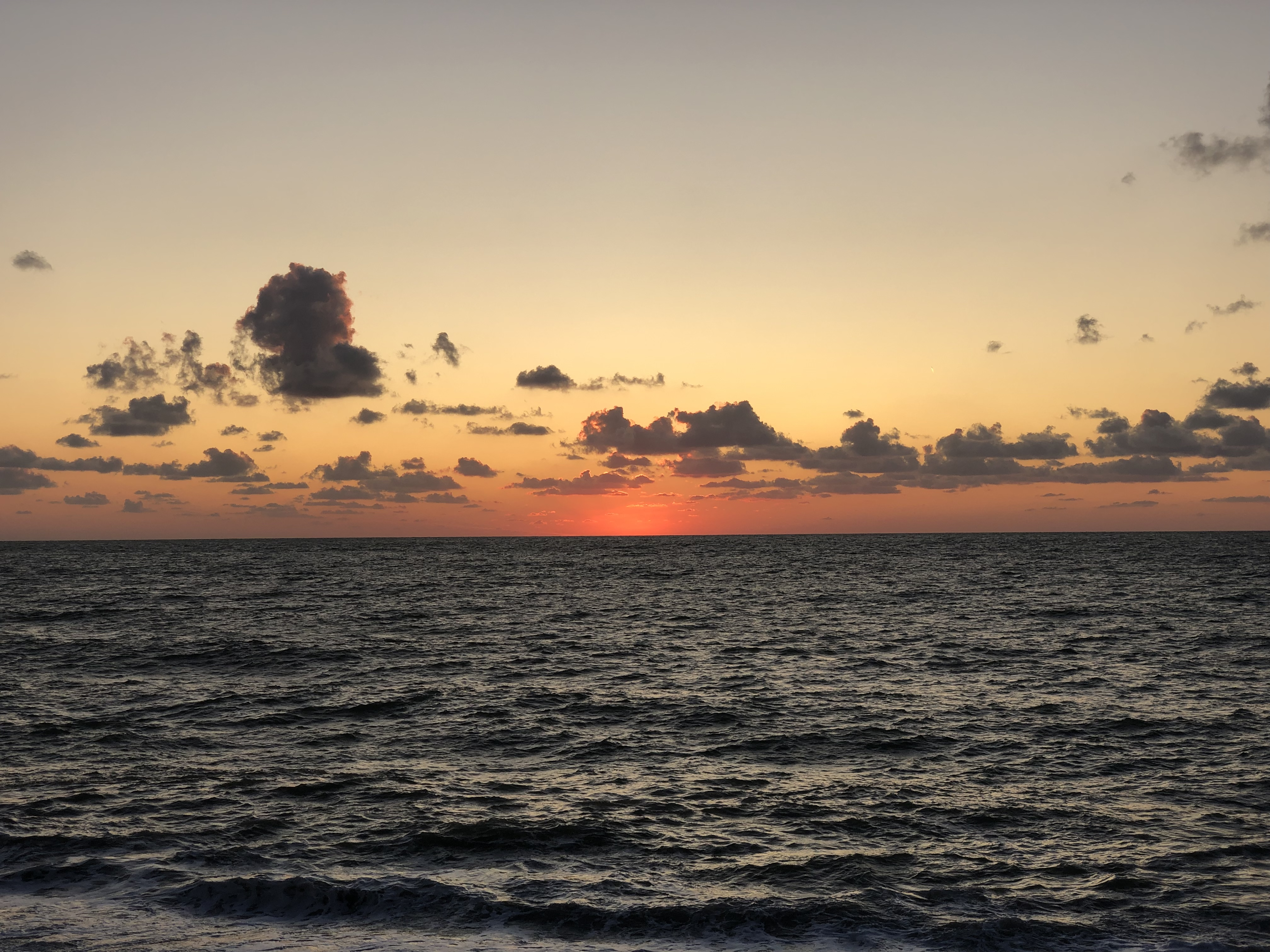
Sunset in Kobuleti

Kobuleti has a humid subtropical climate, with mild winters and hot summers.

Climate data for Kobuleti (1991–2020, extremes 1981-2020)
Month	Jan	Feb	Mar	Apr	May	Jun	Jul	Aug	Sep	Oct	Nov	Dec	Year
Record high °C (°F)	21.1 (70.0)	25.0 (77.0)	30.5 (86.9)	36.0 (96.8)	42.5 (108.5)	38.5 (101.3)	41.5 (106.7)	39.4 (102.9)	39.5 (103.1)	34.7 (94.5)	27.2 (81.0)	25.2 (77.4)	42.5 (108.5)
Mean daily maximum °C (°F)	10.8 (51.4)	11.2 (52.2)	13.7 (56.7)	17.1 (62.8)	21.1 (70.0)	25.2 (77.4)	27.6 (81.7)	28.3 (82.9)	25.6 (78.1)	21.7 (71.1)	16.6 (61.9)	12.7 (54.9)	19.3 (66.8)
Mean daily minimum °C (°F)	2.6 (36.7)	2.8 (37.0)	5.1 (41.2)	7.9 (46.2)	12.5 (54.5)	17.0 (62.6)	19.8 (67.6)	20.3 (68.5)	16.4 (61.5)	12.1 (53.8)	6.8 (44.2)	3.9 (39.0)	10.6 (51.1)
Record low °C (°F)	−8.0 (17.6)	−13.8 (7.2)	−10.0 (14.0)	−3.6 (25.5)	2.6 (36.7)	7.0 (44.6)	12.1 (53.8)	11.5 (52.7)	6.1 (43.0)	0.4 (32.7)	−1.4 (29.5)	−9.0 (15.8)	−13.8 (7.2)
Average precipitation mm (inches)	237.9 (9.37)	175.9 (6.93)	175.8 (6.92)	94.6 (3.72)	84.1 (3.31)	167.6 (6.60)	192.6 (7.58)	240.9 (9.48)	308.9 (12.16)	318.1 (12.52)	255.1 (10.04)	269.9 (10.63)	2,521.4 (99.26)
Average precipitation days (≥ 1.0 mm)	14.4	12.7	13.6	10	9	9.7	10.8	10.9	11.2	12.2	11.9	13.3	139.7
Source: NCEI

== Culture ==
In 2012, the Kobuleti Local History Museum was opened in a former cinema building. The main exhibits of the museum include archaeological findings from the Kobuleti Municipality, artifacts from the past, and works by sculptor Vazha Verulidze.

In the town, the FC Shukura Kobuleti football team plays at the Chele Arena.

== Transportation ==
The town of Kobuleti has a railway station that connects it to the capital of Tbilisi, within the Tbilisi-Batumi line. The S2 highway passes through the town, and it is connected by roads to Batumi, Ozurgeti, and Ureki. There is a railway station in the city on the Samtredia-Makhinjauri line, with regular rail connections to Tbilisi, Kutaisi, Batumi, and Ozurgeti.

== Demographics ==
Historical population
Year	Pop.	±% p.a.
1926	1,904	—
1939	6,133	+9.42%
1959	12,598	+3.66%
1970	18,051	+3.32%
1979	18,283	+0.14%
1989	20,637	+1.22%
2002	18,556	−0.81%
2014	16,546	−0.95%
2024	17,372	+0.49%
Source: Population data

== Twin towns – sister cities ==
Kobuleti is twinned with the following cities:

- Akhtala, Armenia
- Alaverdi, Armenia
- Terracina, Italy
- Selçuk, Turkey
- Pivdenne, Odesa Oblast, Ukraine
- Varna, Bulgaria

== Notable people ==
- Jano Ananidze (b. 1992), former professional footballer
- Revaz Chelebadze (b. 1955), retired footballer
- Fadiko Gogitidze (1916 - 1940), pilot
- Nino Katamadze (b. 1972), singer and composer
- Kakhaber Mzhavanadze (b. 1978), footballer
- Zurab Nogaideli (b. 1964), former Prime Minister of Georgia
- Çürüksulu Mahmud Pasha (1864 - 1931), Ottoman general and politician
- Giorgi Tkhilaishvili (b. 1991), Georgian rugby union player
- Irakli Turmanidze (b. 1984), Olympic weightlifter

Since 2007, the Adjara government has annually awarded citizens of the town the title of "Honorary Kobuleti" for achievements in several fields.

== See also ==
- Adjara
- Batumi
