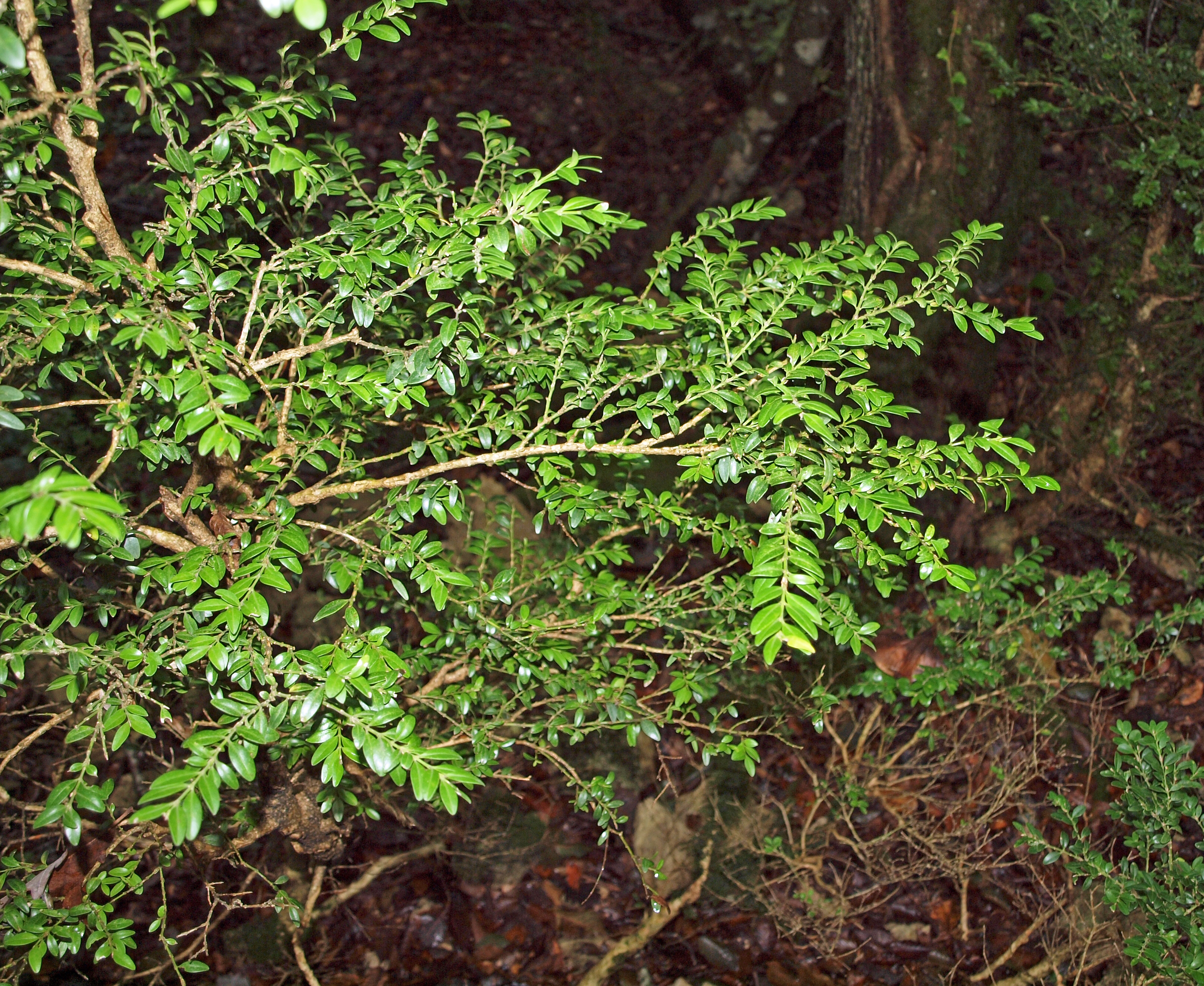
- Buxus colchica, Sataplia Nature Park, Georgia

Conservation status
- Near Threatened (IUCN 2.3)

Scientific classification
- Kingdom: Plantae
- Clade: Embryophytes
- Clade: Tracheophytes
- Clade: Angiosperms
- Clade: Eudicots
- Order: Buxales
- Family: Buxaceae
- Genus: Buxus
- Species: B. colchica

Binomial name
- Buxus colchica Pojark.

= Buxus colchica =

Species of flowering plant

Buxus colchica (syn. B. hyrcana) is a species of Buxus native to western Georgia, as well as parts of the adjacent southern Russia and northeastern Turkey. It occurs in a truly native state in western Georgia's Colchic forests, but has since naturalized to surrounding areas. Its name is derived from Colchis, an ancient kingdom that was located at what is now the center of the plant's area of distribution.

Buxus colchica is threatened by habitat loss and defoliation by the caterpillars of an introduced moth species, Cydalima perspectalis.

It is an evergreen shrub or small tree, very closely related to Buxus sempervirens, and commonly treated as a synonym of it. From a strictly visual standpoint, it is practically indistinguishable from B. sempervirens; however, distinct habitats where Buxus colchica has been found indicate potential for varying physiological tolerances to environmental stresses.
