= Kintrishi National Park =

National park in Georgia

- formerly Kintrishi Protected Landscape
- IUCN category II (national park)
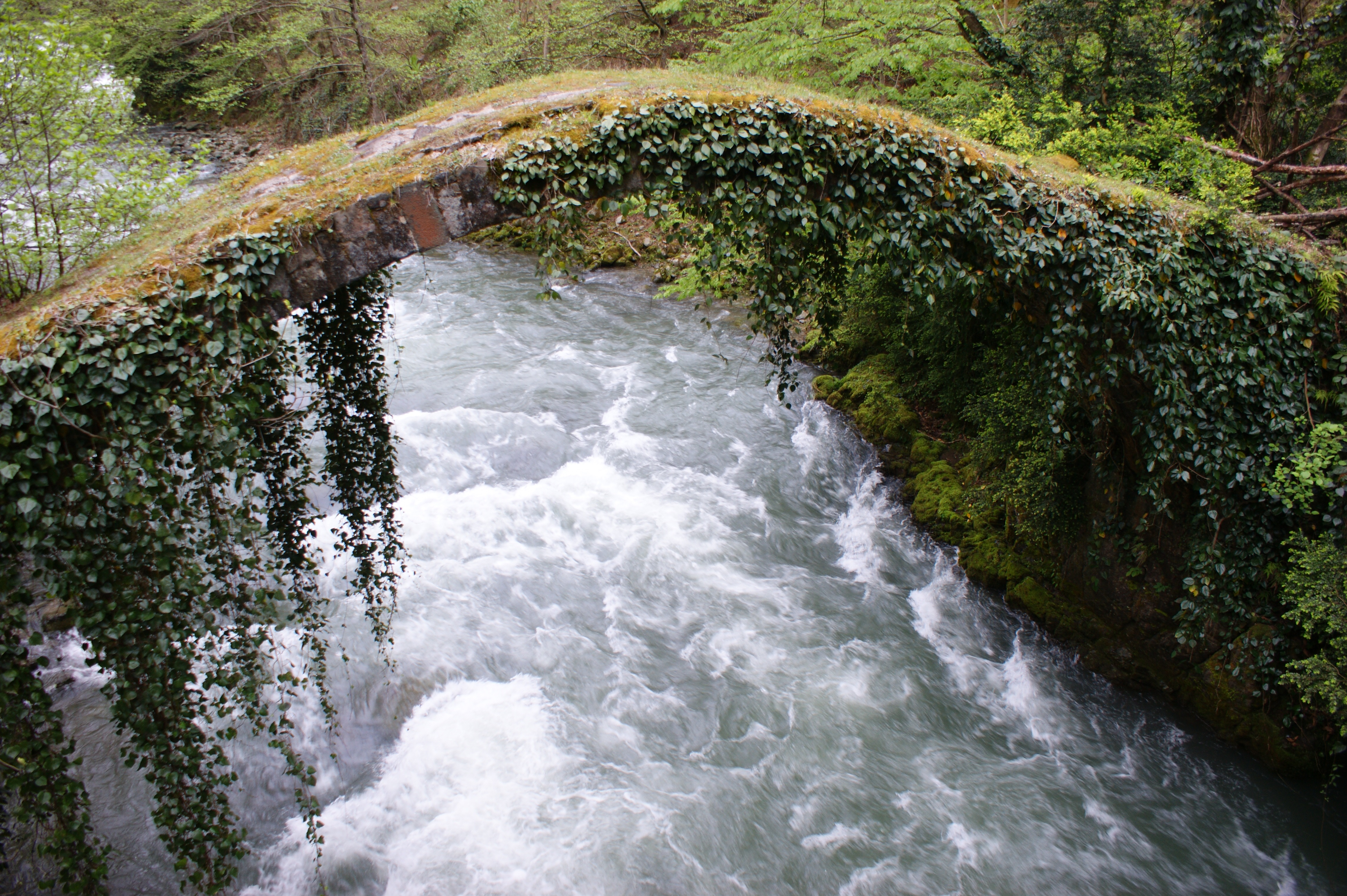
- An arched 12th-century bridge over the Kintrishi

- Location within Georgia Location within Adjara
- Location: Kobuleti District, Adjara, Georgia
- Coordinates: 41°40′55″N 42°02′20″E
- Area: 186.84 km^{2} (72.14 sq mi)
- Established: 2007
- Governing body: Agency of Protected Areas
- Website: Kintrishi Protected Areas Administration

The Kintrishi National Park (Georgian: კინტრიშის დაცული ლანდშაფტი) is a protected landscape in Kobuleti Municipality, Adjara, Western Georgia. Located at the gorge of the Kintrishi River, it was established in 2007.

Kintrishi Protected Areas include Kintrishi National Park and Kintrishi Strict Nature Reserve which was first established in 1959.

The Kintrishi Protected Areas were established to preserve unique flora and fauna and famous Colchican willow trees. Archeological excavations revealed pre-Christian monuments in this areas.

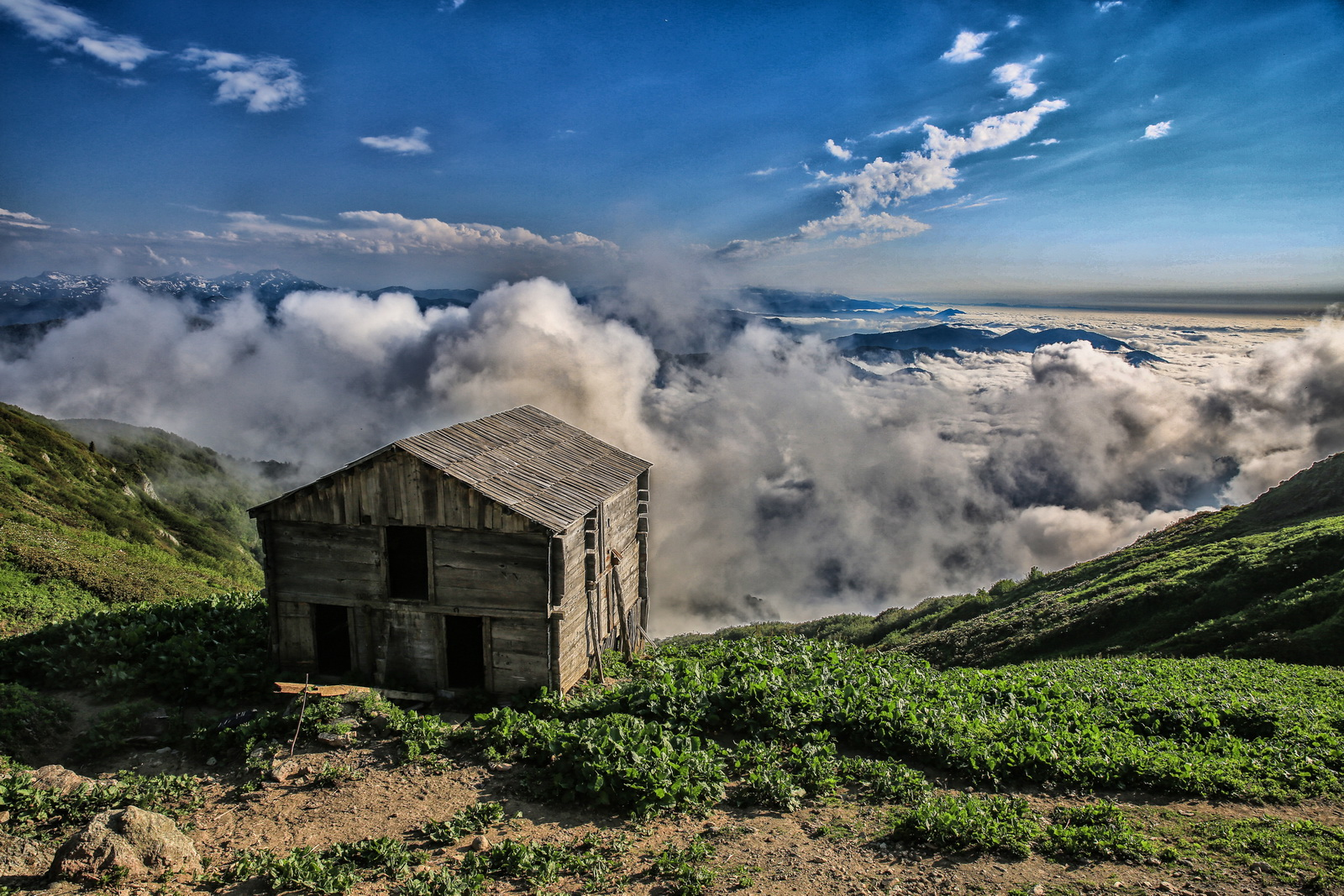
View from Kintrishi Protected Area

== See also ==
- Kintrishi Strict Nature Reserve
- Mtirala National Park
- Euxine-Colchic deciduous forests
