= Mtirala National Park =

National park in Georgia

- IUCN category II (national park)
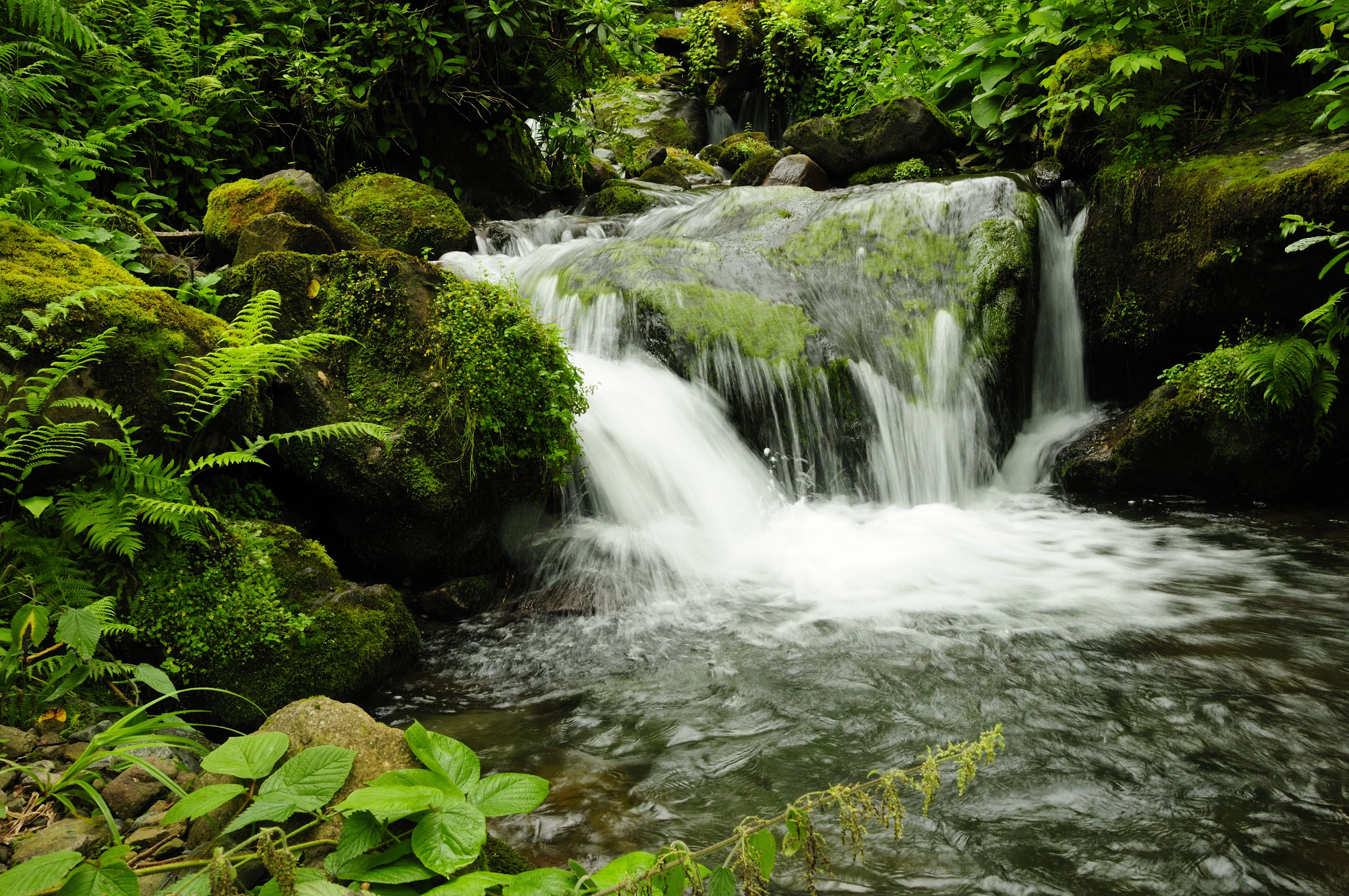
- Waterfall in Mtirala National Park

- Location within Georgia Location within Adjara Location within Asia
- Location: Georgia
- Nearest city: Batumi
- Coordinates: 41°41′51.1″N 41°53′22.2″E
- Area: 281.26 km^{2} (108.60 sq mi)
- Established: 2006
- Governing body: Agency of Protected Areas
- Website: Mtirala National Park Administration

Mtirala National Park (Georgian: მტირალას ეროვნული პარკი; meaning "to cry"; previously, Tsiskara Reserve) is a protected area in Adjara region, Western Georgia. Covering approximately 15,698 hectares (38,790 acres) in the municipalities of Kobuleti, Khelvachauri and Keda in the western Lesser Caucasus, it is situated between the Black Sea and the Adjara Mountains. It also adjoins the Kintrishi National Park. Owing to its outstanding relict forests, diversity of wetland ecosystems, and biodiversity, the national park was inscribed on the UNESCO World Heritage List as part of the Colchic Rainforests and Wetlands in 2021.

== Climate ==
Mtirala National Park is located within the Euxine–Colchic broadleaf forests ecoregion. Because of the funnel-like orientation of the surrounding mountains (the Greater Caucasus and Lesser Caucasus), the national park is extremely humid, with rainfall in the area often exceeding 4 meters (13 ft) per year. Mount Mtirala is one of the most humid areas in the country. The name Mtirala (meaning "to cry") is derived from the 4,520 millimetres (178 in) annual rainfall, making it one of the wettest areas of the former Soviet Union.

== Fauna and flora ==
The high rainfall and topographic diversity of the national park has allowed for the persistence of a wide diversity of habitats and species. Habitats within the park range from lowland forests to mountain meadows, including sweet chestnut and Oriental beech woods with pontic rhododendron, cherry laurel and Colchic box understories and a variety of lianas. Local fauna include the brown bear, roe deer, wild boar, booted eagle, eagle-owl, golden oriole, Caucasian salamander, Caucasian toad, Eurasian marsh frog, and Caucasian viper. In addition, Mtirala National Park is located along the "Batumi bottleneck", which is a convergence zone for migrating raptor species. In total, more than 1 million raptors of 35 different species migrate through the park in the autumn, including more than 50% of the global populations of the booted eagle and European honey buzzard.

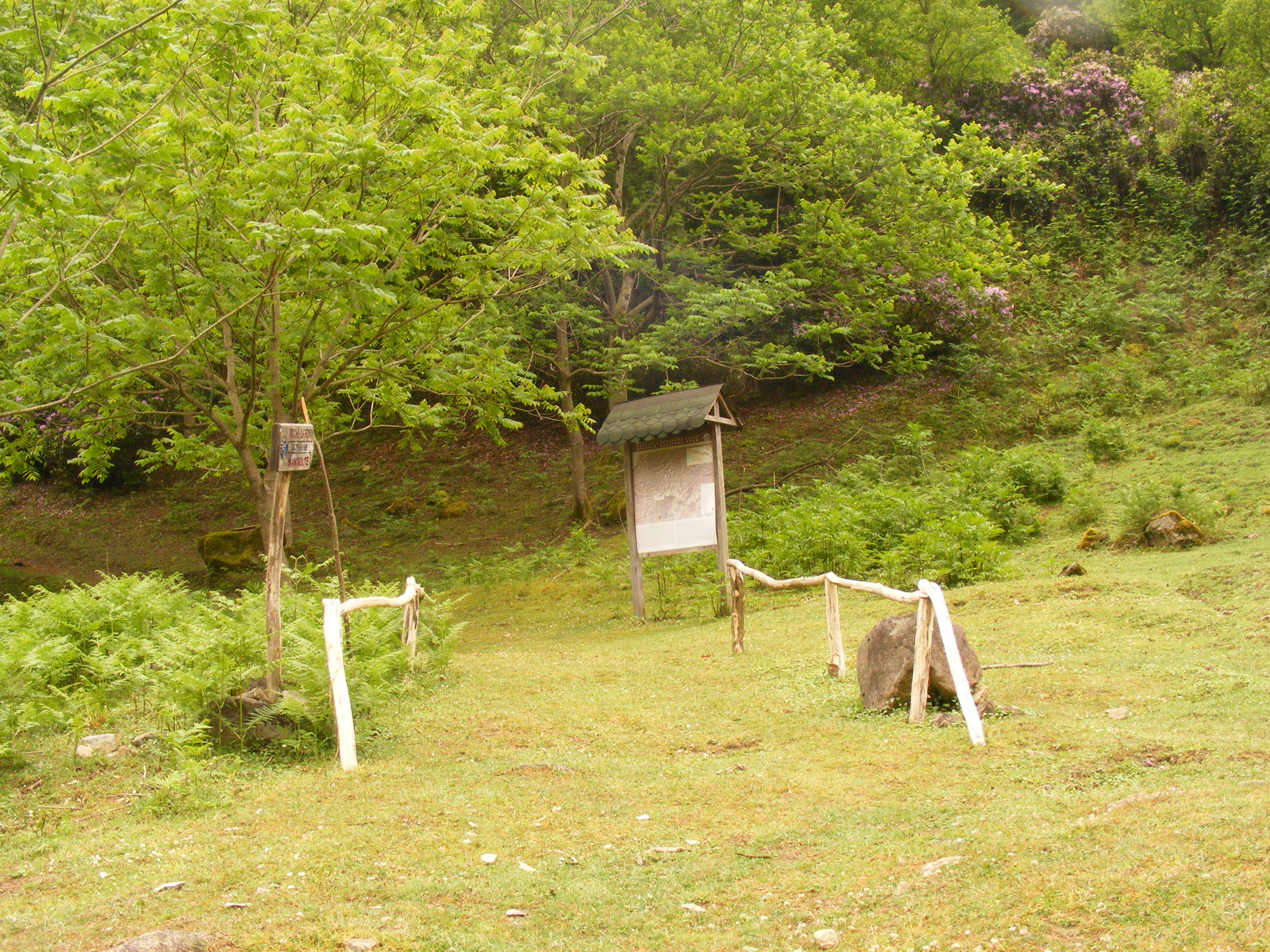
The start of the main hiking route through Mtirala National Park

== See also ==
- Euxine–Colchic broadleaf forests
