= Machakheli =

Historical region in Turkey and Georgia

- Georgian: მაჭახელი
- Location within Georgia Location within Adjara

Geography
- Country: Georgia
- State/Province: Adjara
- Coordinates: 41°31′N 41°49′E
- Interactive map of Machakheli

Machakheli (Georgian: მაჭახელი, Mač’axeli; Turkish: Maçahel) is a historical geographical area in Adjara and long valley along the river Machakhlistskali between Turkey and Georgia. There are 23 settled villages in this valley. For its ecology, flora and fauna, as well as cultural importance, both the Turkish and Georgian segments of the valley are protected by the respective governments.

== History ==
Machakheli, also archaically known as Michikhiani (მიჭიხიანი), had been part of the Georgian kingdom until its fragmentation in the late 15th century. Then it passed to the semi-independent princes of Samtskhe (also known effectively as Saatabago (საათაბაგო) for the rule of atabegs from the Jaqeli family), who submitted to the Ottoman sultan Mehmed II in 1479. The Ottoman administration is not attested until the 1570s. In 1563 the ruler of Machakheli, probably of the Shalikashvili clan, converted to Islam and joined the Ottoman ranks under the name of Lagvesh Ahmed. Under the Ottoman subdivision, Maçahel was a sub-district of the sanjak of Livâne.

The area gained particular fame for its production of muskets nicknamed Machakhela from the late 18th to the mid-19th centuries. Machakheli came sporadically under the control of Imperial Russia during her numerous wars with the Ottoman Empire. After the implementation of the new Turkish-Soviet and Turkish-Georgian border in 1921, Machakheli was divided between two nations.

== Geography ==
The Turkish part of the valley is known as Upper Machakheli and is included in the Borçka district of Artvin Province. It has six villages, which have both official Turkish and unofficial Georgian names. These are Camili (Khertvisi), Düzenli (Zedvake), Efeler (Eprati), Kayalar (Kvabistavi), Maralköy (Mindieti), and Uğurköy (Akria). The centre of all Machakheli, Khertvisi (ხერთვისი), was renamed as "Camili" in 1925 and the vicinity has also become known as Camili. The area is renowned throughout Turkey for its intensive practices of beekeeping and the high quality of honey it produces. In 2005, Camili became Turkey's only UNESCO recognized biosphere reserve.

The Georgian segment, known as Lower Machakheli, is part of the Khelvachauri Municipality of Adjara autonomous republic of Georgia and has twelve villages, including Zeda Chkhutuneti, Kveda Chkhukuneti, Chikuneti, Tskhemlara, Skurdidi, Acharisagmarti, Kedkedi, Sindieti, Chanivri, Gor-Gadzeti, and Saputkreti. The territory is known for its endemic trout. The area contains the Machakhela Gun Monument, Gvara fortress, Mirveti waterfall, the 12th century Mirveti stone bridge, a World War II-era artillery piece and the Machakheli Ethnographic Museum. In July 2012, Georgia established the Machakheli National Park and signed a United States-sponsored Trans-boundary Cooperation Action Plan with Turkey to address environmental issues in the region.

== See also ==
- Imerkhevi
- Nigali valley
- Şavşat
- Machakhela National Park
