= Camili Biosphere Reserve =

UNESCO biosphere reserve in Turkey

- Interactive map of Camili Biosphere Reserve
- Location: Borçka, Artvin, Turkey
- Coordinates: 41°26′11″N 41°57′32″E
- Designation: Biosphere Reserve
- Established: 29 June 2005

The Camili UNESCO Biosphere Reserve is a biosphere reserve in Borçka district in Artvin, Turkey. The area covers a basin of 25,395 hectares, including Camili village and six other villages. The basin includes two protected natural forest areas, the Maral Waterfall, and two valleys. It was added to the UNESCO Man and the Biosphere Programme in 2005 as the first and only biosphere reserve in Turkey.

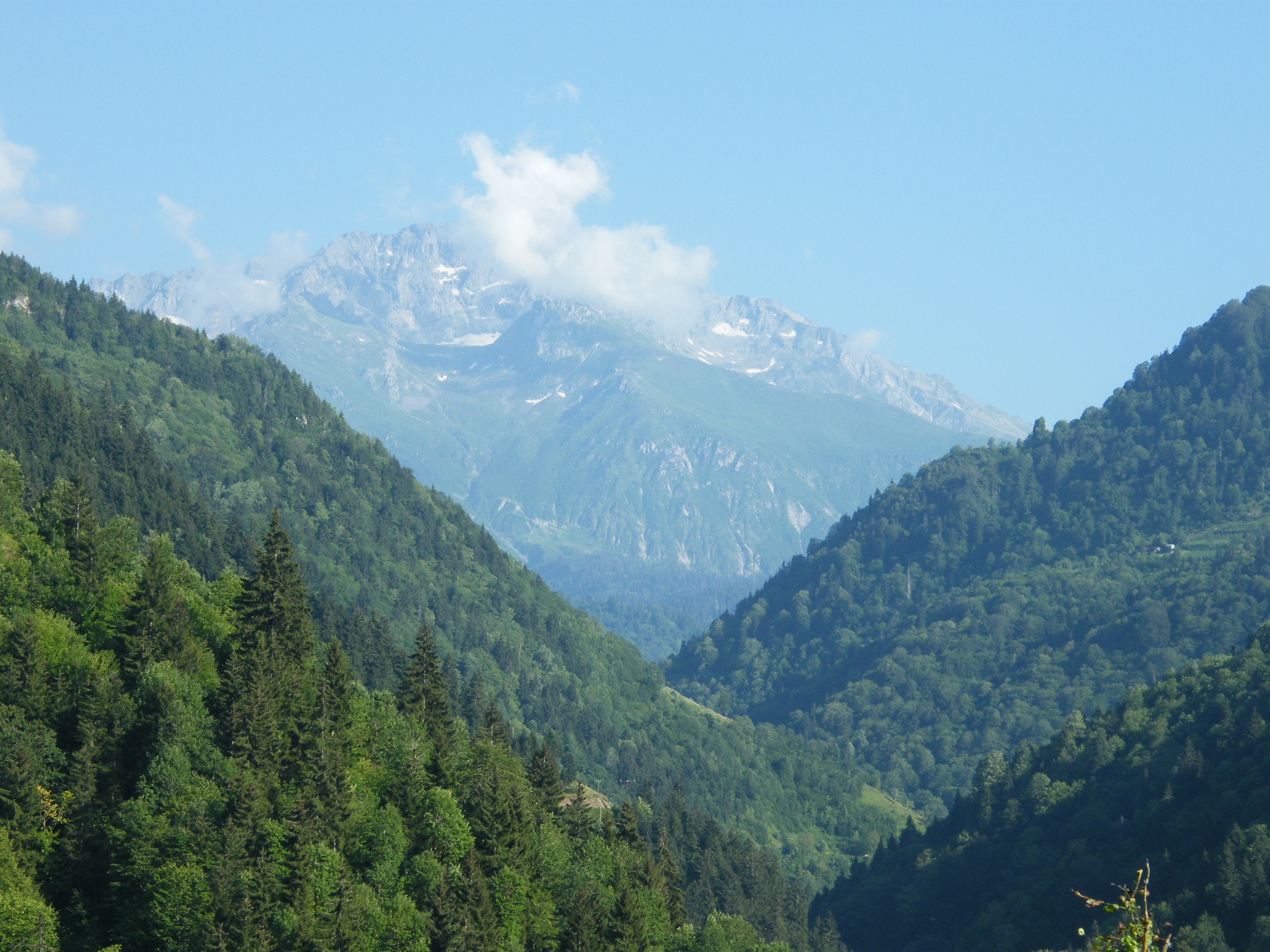
The site of the Camili (Macahel) UNESCO Biosphere Reserve

== Demographics ==
The total population of the area is 1,132 (2025). The Camili Biosphere Reserve includes six villages: Camili, Düzenli, Efeler, Kayalar, Maral, and Uğur. The population of each village is as follows: Camili (186), Düzenli (228), Efeler (194), Kayalar (89), Maral (236), and Uğur (199).

The ethnic origin of Camili and its six surrounding villages is mostly believed to be Georgian. Camili region have relatively high levels of education and environmental awareness.

The local people's main sources of livelihood are agriculture and livestock farming, with hazelnut production being the main focus. In recent years, these have been joined by the growing ecotourism and beekeeping, which has developed around queen bee and honey production. 41% of villagers stated that they are involved in beekeeping, 30% in livestock farming and 22% in organic farming.

== Climate ==
The climate in the Camili Biosphere reserve is mostly a mix of humid oceanic and subtropical climates, with steady rain all year long. The area gets a large amount of rain each year, ranging from 1,315 mm to 1,564 mm. This is mainly because of the steep mountains, with the land rising from 350 meters in the valleys up to 3,400 meters at the peaks of the Karçal Mountains. This constant moisture is the main reason the region has such a thick rainforest ecosystem.

=== Temperature profile ===
The average yearly temperature in the reserve is 11.9 °C. Because of the mountains, temperatures often drop below zero. The area has an average of 108 freezing days and between 121 and 140 frost days every year. July is usually the warmest month, with an average temperature of 19.2 °C. February is the coldest month, with an average of -2.1 °C. In extreme winter weather, the deepest valleys can get as cold as -20 °C to -24 °C.

=== Seasonal variations ===
Winters in the reserve are long and harsh. Snowfall is heavy and often reaches 2 to 3 meters deep. In the past, this massive amount of snow made it impossible to travel by land between the Macahel valley and other parts of Turkey for up to five months of the year. This long isolation is what shaped the independent culture of the local villages. High up in the mountains, the snow can stay on the ground until late May.

Summers, on the other hand, are mild but very humid. The thick forest canopy traps moisture in the air. This humidity keeps the area from getting too hot in the summer and creates the perfect environment for the region's rare plants and the native Caucasian honey bee.

== Culture ==
=== Architecture ===
The Camili (Macahel) valley has preserved a distinctive tradition of Vernacular architecture shaped by its humid temperate rainforest environment and geographic isolation. Traditional buildings are constructed mainly from local timber such as spruce, chestnut (wood), and oak combined with stone foundations adapted to steep slopes. A characteristic construction method is the çantı (log construction) technique, in which wooden logs are interlocked at the corners without the use of nails.

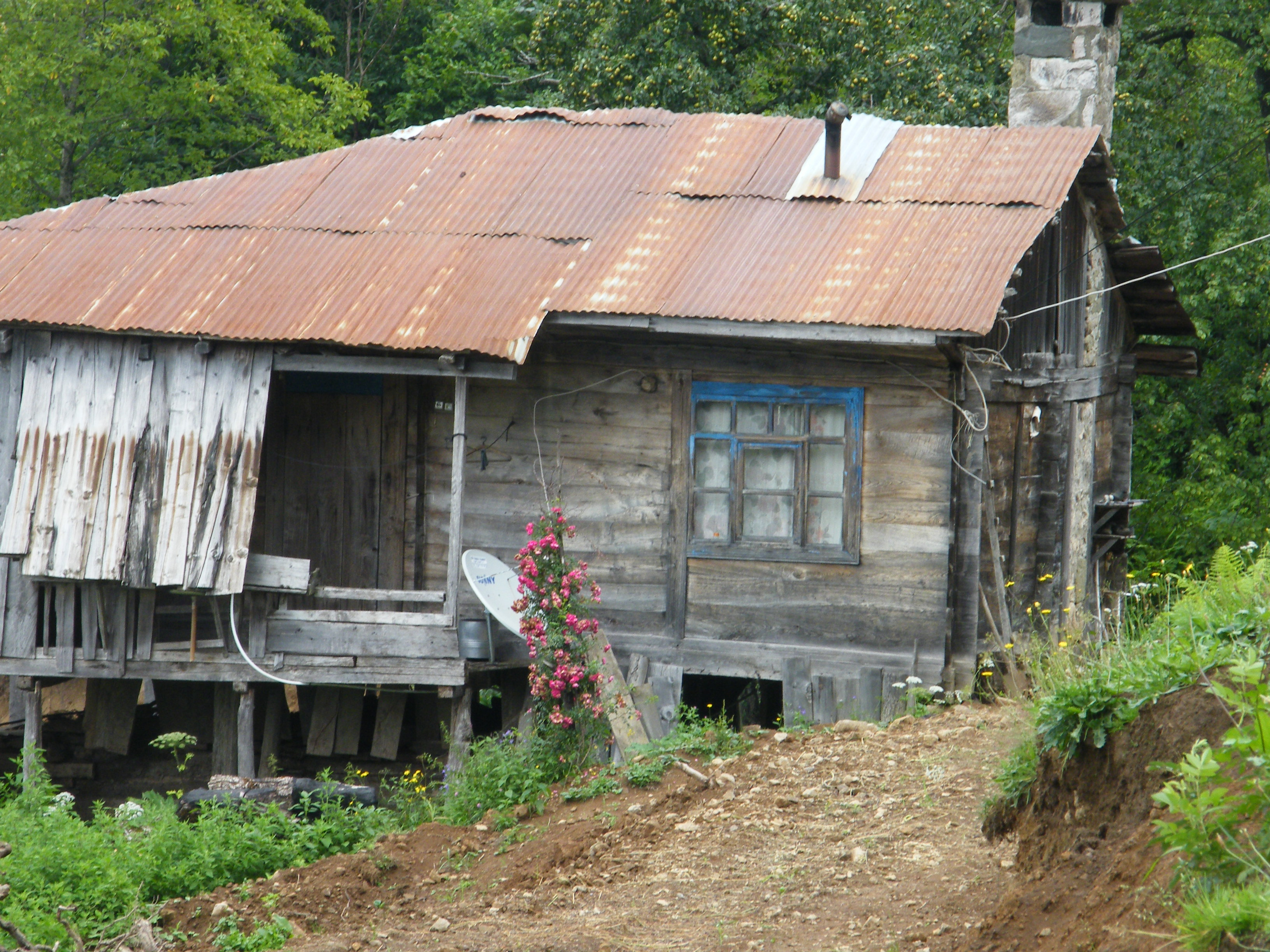
Village house located at the Maral Area

Traditional woodworking is an important cultural expression, especially in house interiors and religious buildings, where carved and painted wooden decorations reflect regional interpretations of Seljuk architecture and Ottoman architecture. The region contains several 19th-century wooden mosques, including:

- İremit (Maralköy) Mosque (1851)
- Camili Village Mosque (1855)
- Efeler Mosque (1958)

These represent examples of local wooden religious architecture.

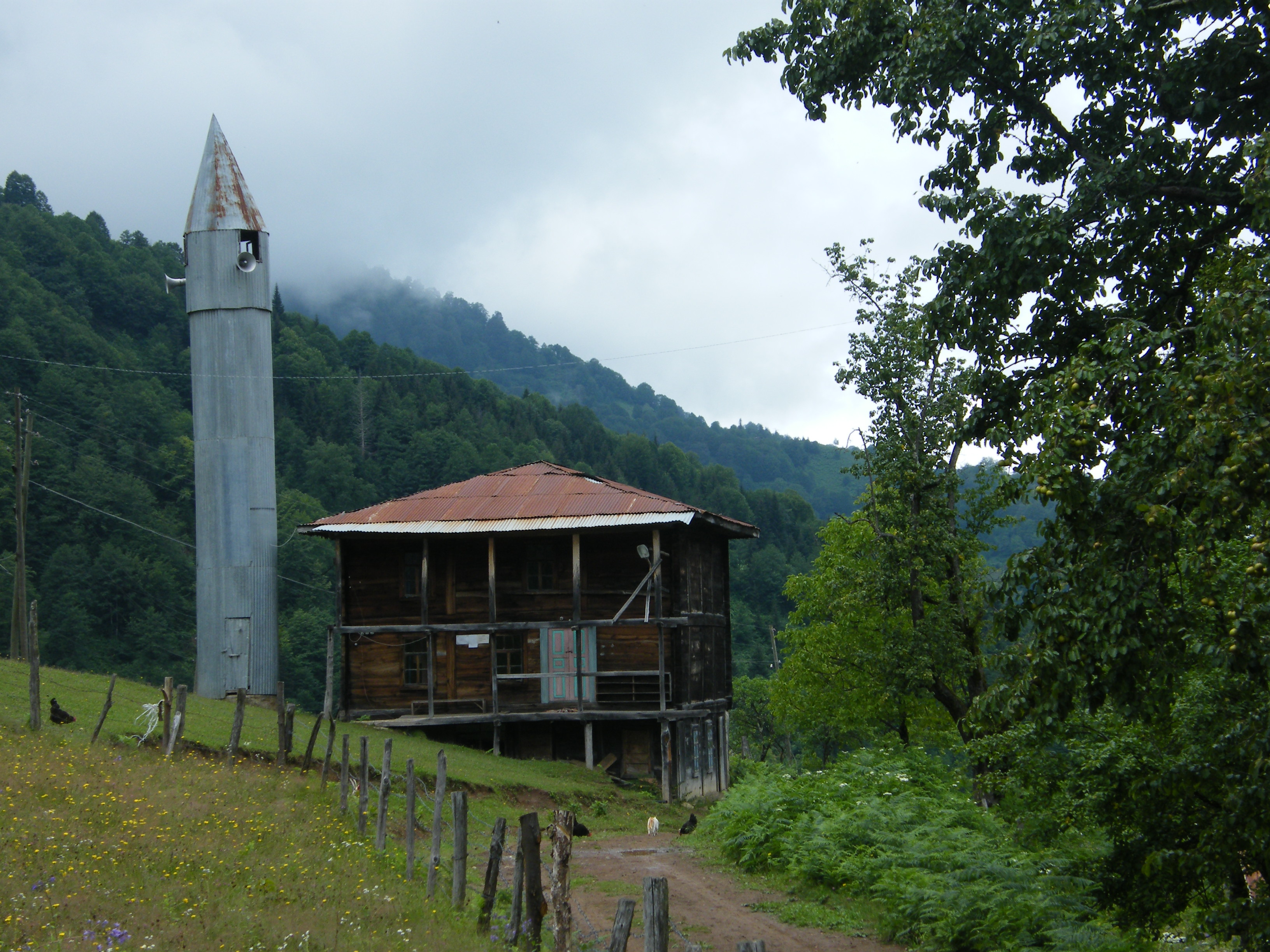
Iremit Mosque

Another characteristic structure is the Serander (traditional raised storage barn), used for food storage and designed to protect products from moisture and pests while allowing ventilation.

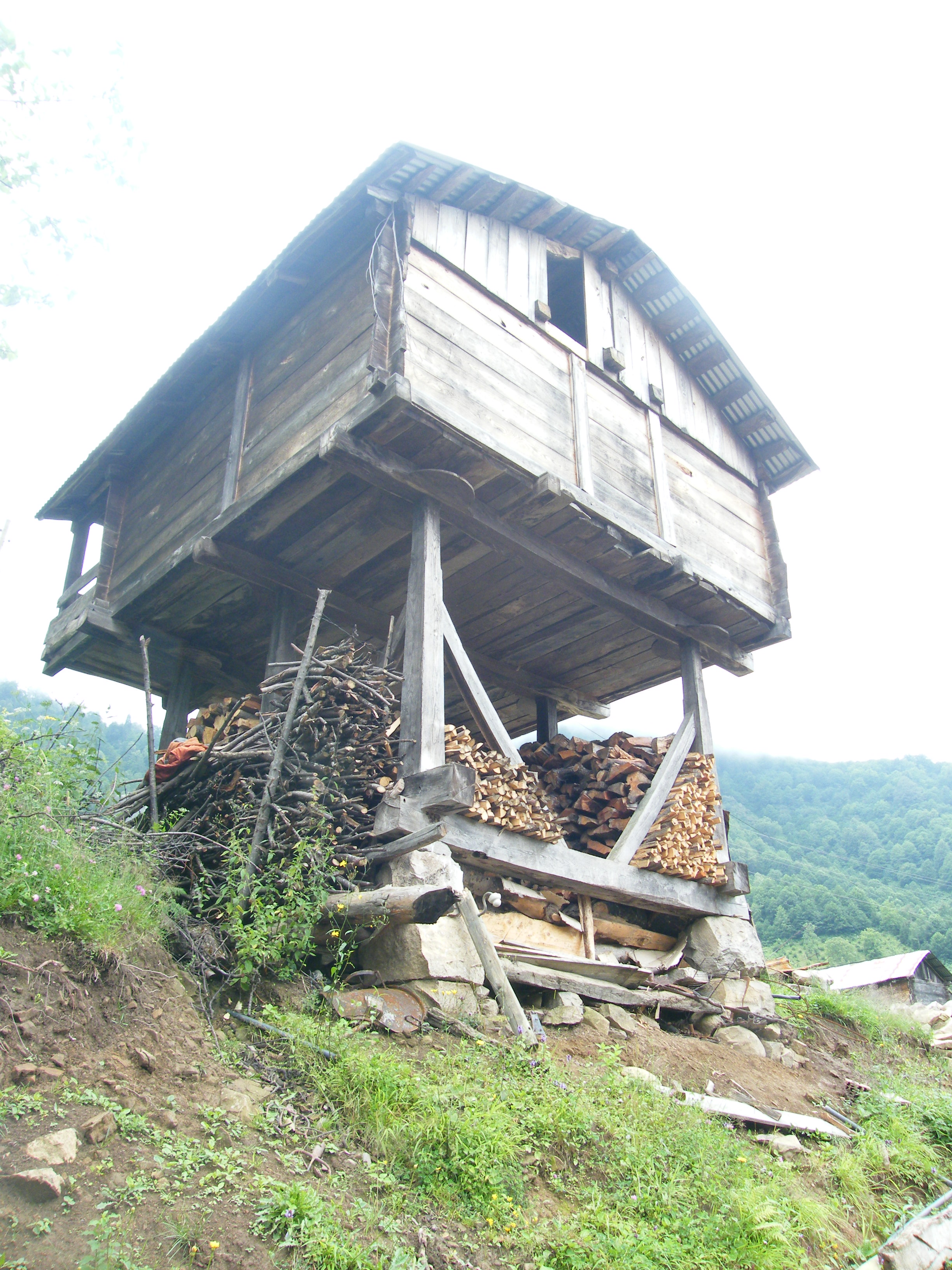
Village house Serender

=== Oral traditions and music ===
Oral traditions remain an important part of cultural life in Camili. Folktales, poems, and epics are traditionally shared in community gatherings, particularly during winter months, and serve to transmit cultural values across generations. The region is associated with Georgian-influenced Polyphonic music, which is performed in daily life and social events. This tradition is transmitted orally and relies on intergenerational teaching. A local ensemble, the Macahel Polyphonic Choir, has contributed to the preservation of this musical heritage. (Note: Elderly choir becomes a 'living treasure'. Daily Sabah. Retrieved 10 April 2026.)

The population is bilingual, with both Turkish language and Georgian language spoken in daily life. The local dialect of Camili, includes vocabulary related to social cooperation and traditional musical practices.

=== Traditional ecological knowledge and livelihoods ===
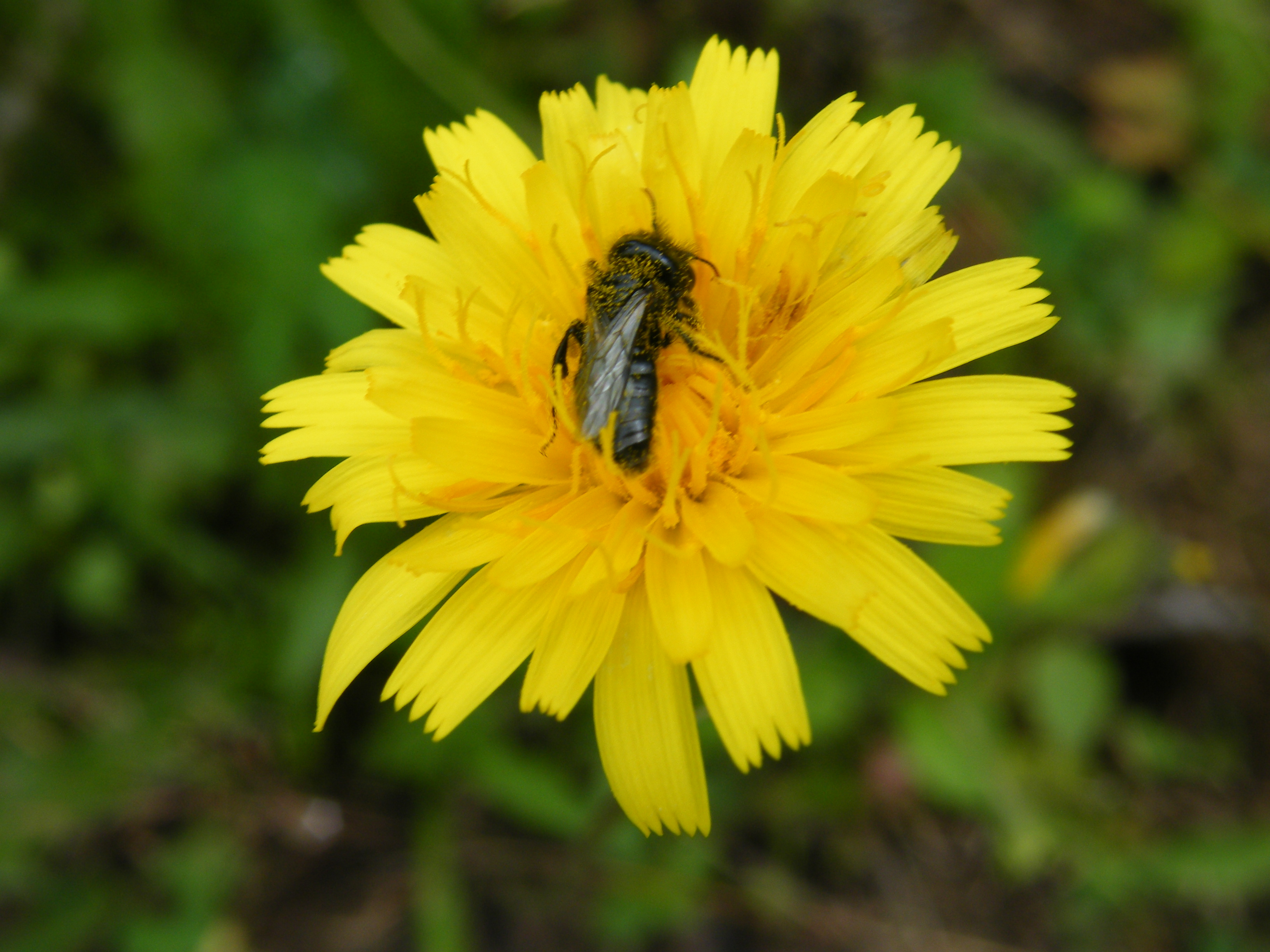
Flower and a Kafkas bee (Apis mellifera caucasia)

Traditional livelihoods in Camili are closely linked to ecological knowledge and sustainable use of natural resources. Beekeeping is a central activity, and the region is known for the conservation of the Caucasian honey bee (Apis mellifera caucasia), supported by local development initiatives.

Wild foraging remains important, with local communities collecting berries, fruits, nuts, and medicinal plants from surrounding forests. Common products include: Wild blueberries (locally known as likapa, forest fruits, nuts, such as chestnut and hazelnut, various medicinal herbs used for food and traditional medicine.

Handicrafts, particularly woodworking and weaving, are also important cultural practices. Wooden household items such as kitchen tools, storage containers, and furniture are traditionally made from local timber. Weaving traditions include hand-knitted wool products such as socks and textiles, often decorated with geometric patterns and colored using natural dyes derived from plants.

== Social structure and community life ==
The social structure of the Camili Basin (Macahel) is shaped by its geographical isolation and long-standing traditions of communal survival. This has fostered a community life based on solidarity, cooperation, and collective labor.

=== Isolation and solidarity ===
Historically, the region experienced seasonal isolation, with access routes often closed for several months due to heavy snowfall. This resulted in a high degree of self-sufficiency and strong community interdependence. During periods of isolation, villagers relied on collective assistance for essential needs, including transporting sick individuals by sled or carrying supplies on foot when roads were inaccessible. Households commonly shared food and basic resources throughout the winter period to ensure communal survival.

=== Collective work and solidarity ===
The tradition of Imece (collective labor) is a central element of social organization in the basin, particularly for agricultural activities such as corn processing (locally known as kunçala). These collective work gatherings also function as social and cultural spaces where oral traditions, stories, and traditional songs are shared between generations. Communal infrastructure, such as water mills, is traditionally managed as shared property, with community members jointly responsible for maintenance and use, reinforcing cooperation and mutual trust.

=== Social roles and management ===
In the traditional highland (yayla) system, women play a central role in both household management and agricultural production, including food preparation and seasonal provisioning. Respect for elderly community members remains an important social value. Elderly residents contribute to cultural continuity, particularly through the preservation of oral traditions and music. The Macahel Elders' Choir represents an example of this role, contributing to the transmission of local Polyphonic music traditions across generations.

== History ==
The Camili (Macahel) valley, located in the Artvin Province of Turkey, has a long and complex historical background shaped by its position in the Caucasus region and its role as a borderland between empires.

The historical name of the region, Macahel (also spelled Maçahel), is commonly associated with Georgian linguistic roots and is often interpreted as referring to a valley structure resembling an open hand, reflecting the surrounding mountainous landscape.

Historical references to the wider region date back to the 3rd century BCE during the reign of Pharnavaz I of Iberia, ruler of the early Kingdom of Iberia. The area later formed part of the medieval Georgian cultural and political sphere and reached a peak during the 12th century under Queen Tamar of Georgia. Local traditions also associate the region with her burial, although this is not confirmed by historical sources. From the 13th century onward, the region was affected by major invasions, including the Mongol invasions and later campaigns led by Timur. These events contributed to political fragmentation and demographic change in the wider region.

Following the Fall of Constantinople (1453), the area became part of the frontier zone between the Ottoman Empire and neighboring powers, including Safavid Iran. From the 16th century, western Georgia came under Ottoman influence. Over time, the region experienced administrative control or influence from various states and empires, including Byzantine, Seljuk, Mongol, Ottoman, and later Russian and Georgian administrations.

A major turning point occurred during the Russo-Turkish War (1877–1878), when the region came under Russian control, leading to significant population movements. Following the Congress of Berlin (1878), local populations were given the option of migration or remaining under new administrative arrangements. This process contributed to the division of the Macahel region, with settlements split between what is now Turkey and Georgia. The Turkish side became known as Camili.

The administrative structure was later formalized through agreements in the late 19th century, with population movements continuing into the early 20th century, including after 1921. The region historically included settlements associated with the Macahel valley system, and its administrative center was known as Hertvisi (local historical reference to a confluence settlement).

In 1925, the name Camili was officially adopted. Until the mid-20th century, transportation remained limited, with access mainly by foot and horseback until road construction in 1968. Economically, the region traditionally relied on subsistence agriculture and forestry. Attempts to introduce tea cultivation were largely unsuccessful, while hazelnut production became more established in later periods. A water-powered mill system, reflecting traditional rural infrastructure, was also used locally.

In the late 20th century, the ecological importance of the region gained recognition. Key forest areas such as Efeler and Gorgit were placed under protection in 1998. Conservation initiatives were expanded through national and international environmental programs, culminating in the designation of the Camili Basin as Turkey's first Biosphere reserve by UNESCO on 29 June 2005. Today, the Camili Biosphere Reserve is recognized for its integration of biodiversity conservation, traditional land use, and sustainable rural development within the Colchic Rainforests and Wetlands ecosystem.

== Ecological and socioeconomic profile ==
=== Natural resource biodiversity ===
The Caucasus is a region that has the biggest natural old-growth forest ecosystems in a large area that includes Europe and Central Asia. The Caucasus is home to approximately 7,000 plant species, of which 1,700 are endemic. It is noted that the areas with the richest biodiversity within the Caucasus Ecoregion are concentrated in the border region between Turkey and Georgia. The Karçal Mountains Important Plant Area is one of 122 Important Plant Areas in Turkey. The Camili Basin is a big part of it.

The Caucasus has a wide range of climates and landforms, which has led to the growth of plants that are very important for protecting nature. Flora studies in the Camili region have found 990 different types of vascular plants. Out of these taxa, 399 have been found to have medicinal properties and are used by people in the area. The Camili Biosphere Reserve is an important place for natural resources because it has many different types of plants that grow there naturally and can be used in many ways.

=== Land use and agriculture ===
The Camili Biosphere Reserve is mostly mountainous, with most of its 25,395 hectares covered by forests, pastures, and alpine ecosystems. There is not a lot of flat land in the reserve. This has affected how people farm and where they build houses. The six villages in the basin are in the valleys and near the hazelnut orchards.

The generally rugged and sloping terrain limits the economic value of agricultural activities; consequently, production is primarily carried out to meet the household's own needs. A large portion (85%) of the products grown in the region are organic, and production is carried out using traditional methods without the use of chemical fertilizers.

Due to heavy rainfall and a lack of suitable irrigation areas, irrigated agriculture cannot be practiced; the main crops include corn, hazelnuts, beans, cabbage, squash, walnuts, and cherries.

Vegetable production, however, generally remains at the level of individual consumption. Livestock activities are similarly limited, with approximately 1,650 head of cattle and 300 head of small livestock, primarily aimed at meeting household needs. Generally, each household owns its own agricultural, meadow, and grazing lands, which are used for subsistence production.

=== Environmental challenges ===
In the Camili (Macahel) Biosphere Reserve, ecotourism development has been identified as a potential source of environmental pressure when not adequately planned and managed. Studies indicate that increasing visitor numbers may contribute to habitat degradation, changes in wildlife behavior, and pressures on ecosystem balance.

Road construction and other infrastructure projects place significant pressure on the environment. While local communities identify transportation improvements as necessary, they also emphasize the importance of environmental protection during this process, as degradation of the natural environment reduces the appeal of the area for ecotourism.

=== Conservation initiatives ===
The Camili (Macahel) Biosphere Reserve was one of four pilot implementation areas in Turkey under the Biodiversity and Natural Resource Management Project, supported by the Global Environment Facility (GEF). Implemented between 2000 and 2008, the project focused on biodiversity conservation and the management of ecotourism impacts, with Camili representing the Caucasian temperate rainforest ecosystem.

== Public health and wellbeing ==
=== Medicinal plants and traditional knowledge ===
The use of medicinal plants for treatment dates back to early human history. Plant-based treatment is studied under phytotherapy, and nature-based therapies are widely used in regions such as Europe and North America.

In the Camili Biosphere Reserve, 399 out of 990 plant species are used by local communities for medicinal purposes. This demonstrates the strong connection between traditional knowledge and local health practices. As population growth and healthcare costs increase, the careful and informed use of medicinal plants has been suggested as a complementary approach to reducing healthcare expenses.

=== Rural development and wellbeing ===
With the development of ecotourism, health and education services in rural areas have improved. These developments contribute to the overall wellbeing of local communities.

== Governance ==
The management of the Camili Biosphere Reserve is based on the principles of sustainable development and participatory governance, aiming to balance biodiversity conservation with local socio-economic needs. A management plan for the area was prepared in 2007 within the scope of the "Biodiversity and Natural Resource Management Project"; however, this plan has not been fully implemented, leading to ongoing governance challenges. The current management structure is characterized by a multi-actor system involving the Ministry of Agriculture and Forestry (Turkey), local administrations, and local communities, but the absence of a clearly defined legal status and institutional authority has resulted in coordination problems and management ambiguity. In line with the general biosphere reserve model developed under UNESCO's Man and the Biosphere Programme, management is expected to integrate conservation, development, and logistical support functions while encouraging stakeholder participation in decision-making processes. However, studies indicate that participatory mechanisms in Camili have not always been effectively implemented, and conflicts have emerged due to limited stakeholder involvement and unmet expectations. Consequently, recent research highlights the need for a clearly defined governance framework, legal recognition of biosphere reserve status, and the implementation of an updated and inclusive management plan to ensure sustainable and effective management of the area.

== Tourism ==
=== Ecotourism ===
The Camili Basin, also known as Macahel, is a major destination for Ecotourism and was designated as Turkey's first Biosphere reserve by UNESCO in 2005. Located on the border with Georgia, the basin consists of six villages: Uğur, Düzenli, Camili, Kayalar, Efeler, and Maral. The region is known for its rich biodiversity, hosting 990 plant species, including endemic species, and for protecting the Caucasian honey bee (Apis mellifera caucasica). In addition to its natural features, the area has cultural landmarks such as the Camili Mosque (1855) and İremit Mosque (1851), which reflect traditional wooden architecture. The 63-metre Maral Waterfall is a key natural attraction for visitors. Ecotourism activities in the region emphasize sustainability by incorporating local practices such as beekeeping, handicrafts, and ethnobotanical knowledge into visitor experiences. This approach supports both environmental conservation and local livelihoods.

=== Accommodation ===
Accommodation in the Camili Biosphere Reserve is primarily based on small-scale, locally operated guesthouses and traditional wooden houses. These structures reflect the region's architectural heritage and are integrated into the natural environment, supporting principles of sustainable tourism. Visitors are offered opportunities to experience rural life and local culture through community-based lodging. Large-scale tourism infrastructure is limited in order to preserve the ecological balance and biodiversity of the area.

=== Biodiversity and natural environment ===
The Camili Biosphere Reserve is characterized by high biodiversity and diverse ecosystems, including temperate forests [REF is needed here]. The region lies along an important bird migration route and provides habitats for a wide range of species. The presence of endemic flora and fauna, along with conservation-oriented management practices typical of biosphere reserves, contributes to the ecological significance of the area.

=== Local products ===
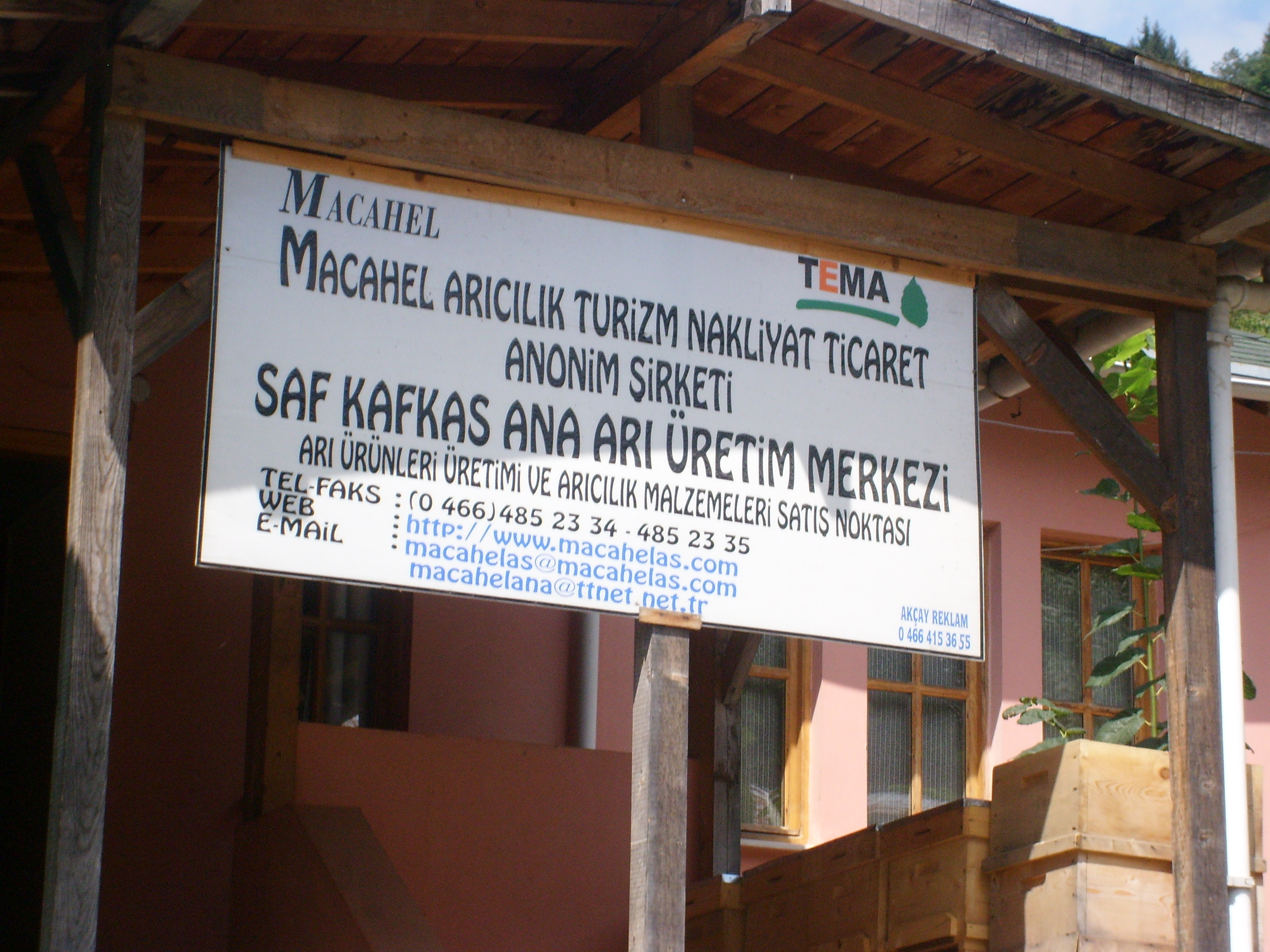
Bee house

==== Beekeeping ====
Beekeeping is a major economic activity in the region, centered on the Caucasian honey bee (Apis mellifera caucasica). The production of organic honey and the conservation of genetically pure bee populations are key components of the local economy. Approximately 30% of the population is engaged in beekeeping activities. Earlier practices were primarily traditional, but have evolved through development initiatives.

==== Dairy products and animal husbandry ====
Traditional animal husbandry is an important component of the local economy. Dairy products derived from cattle farming are widely used in regional cuisine. Examples include Silor and laz böreği, which reflect the region's reliance on local agricultural resources. (Note: Dairy Products and Animal Husbandry. access-date=2026-04-10. https://artvin.goturkiye.com/taste)

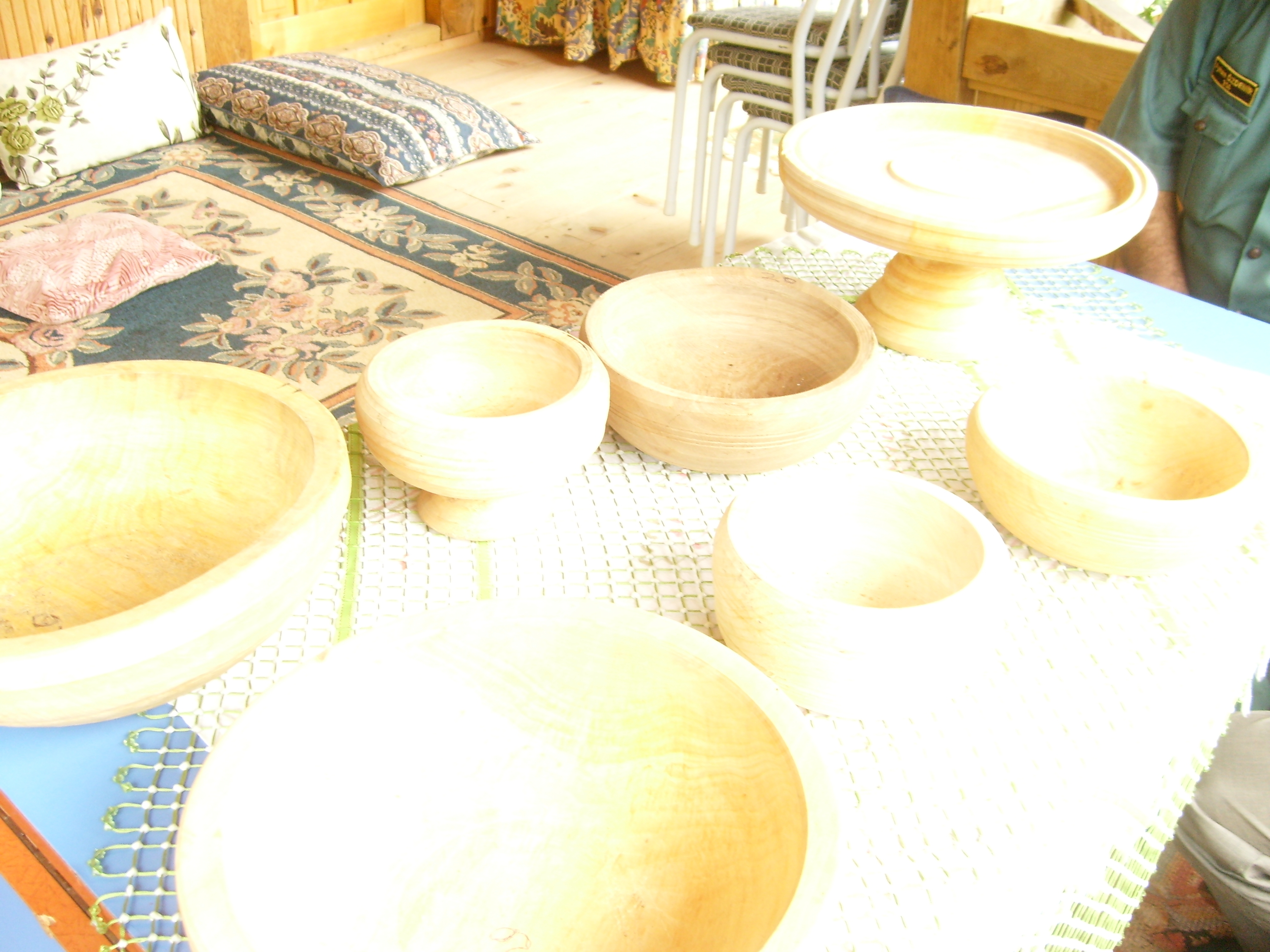
Wooden work of the village

==== Handmade goods ====
Traditional crafts such as woodworking, weaving, and felt-making continue to be practiced, both for household use and as items for visitors. (Note: Artvin handmade goods. access-date=2026-04-10. https://artvin.goturkiye.com/touch)

==== Forest and herbal products ====
The region is rich in non-timber forest products. Local communities collect species such as Urtica dioica (stinging nettle), Thymus (wild thyme), and wild mushrooms, as well as forest fruits. These products are used in traditional medicine and local cuisine, and surplus production is sold in village markets.

=== Festivals and events ===
==== Camili Pure Caucasian Bee and Honey Festival ====
It is held annually in Artvin Province, usually in August. The event promotes the conservation of the Caucasian honey bee and supports traditional beekeeping practices. The festival brings together local communities, visitors, and producers through cultural activities, exhibitions, and educational programs, contributing to eco-cultural tourism in the region.

=== Transportation ===
Access to the Camili Biosphere Reserve is primarily via Rize–Artvin Airport, located approximately 129 km away. Travel by car typically takes around three hours. Local transportation from Artvin city centre is available via Borçka, usually by minibus, with a travel time of approximately 1.5 to 2 hours. (Note: https://vatandas.kgm.gov.tr/DistrictDistance)

=== Nature-based activities ===
Camili offers a range of nature-based tourism activities supported by its protected status and ecological diversity.

==== Trekking ====
The region includes hiking routes through old-growth forests and mountainous terrain. Trails range from relatively accessible routes, such as the Maral Waterfall trail, to more demanding routes in the Karçal Mountains and Efeler Forest.

==== Waterfalls and highland landscapes ====
The region is known for its scenic waterfalls and mountainous highland landscapes, with Maral Waterfall being one of the most prominent natural attractions. Formed by the convergence of small streams, the waterfall cascades from approximately 68 meters into the valley, creating impressive views surrounded by dense forests and alpine scenery that attract visitors seeking nature experiences and panoramic landscapes. (Note: The pearl of Camili Basin. Wikiloc.)

==== Birdwatching ====
Camili is located within an Important Bird Area and supports a wide variety of bird species. Birdwatching infrastructure, including observation points, has been developed in the region.

==== Photography ====
The region attracts photographers and nature enthusiasts due to its diverse landscapes, including alpine plateaus, glacial lakes, dense forests, and rich biodiversity. Natural features such as endemic plant species and scenic mountain views provide valuable opportunities for landscape and nature photography. (Note: Journey to Macahel's Plateau . Wikiloc.)

==== Camping ====
Camping is practiced in designated natural areas such as valleys, riverbanks, and forest zones, allowing visitors to experience the natural environment. (Note: Artvin Kamp Alanları. Turkish Airlines Blog. Retrieved 9 April 2026.)

==== Cycling ====
The Camili–Maral route is a trekking and cycling trail of approximately 12 km, passing through forest ecosystems and mountainous terrain. The route includes significant elevation gain and leads to the Maral Waterfall, making it suitable for experienced hikers and cyclists. (Note: Macahel - Maral Tour (12 km). Wikiloc.)

== Gallery ==
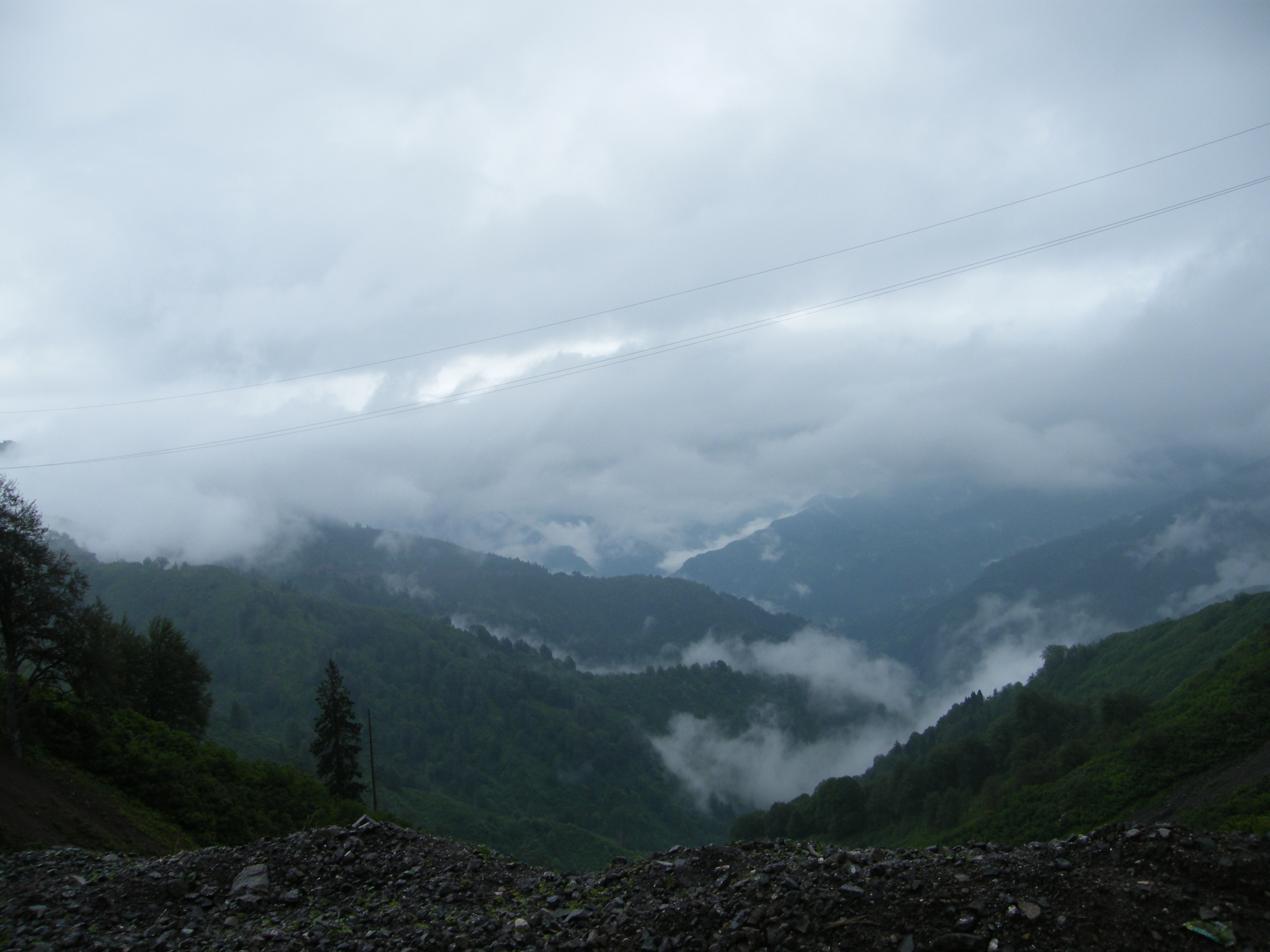
the site of the Camili (Macahel) UNESCO BR

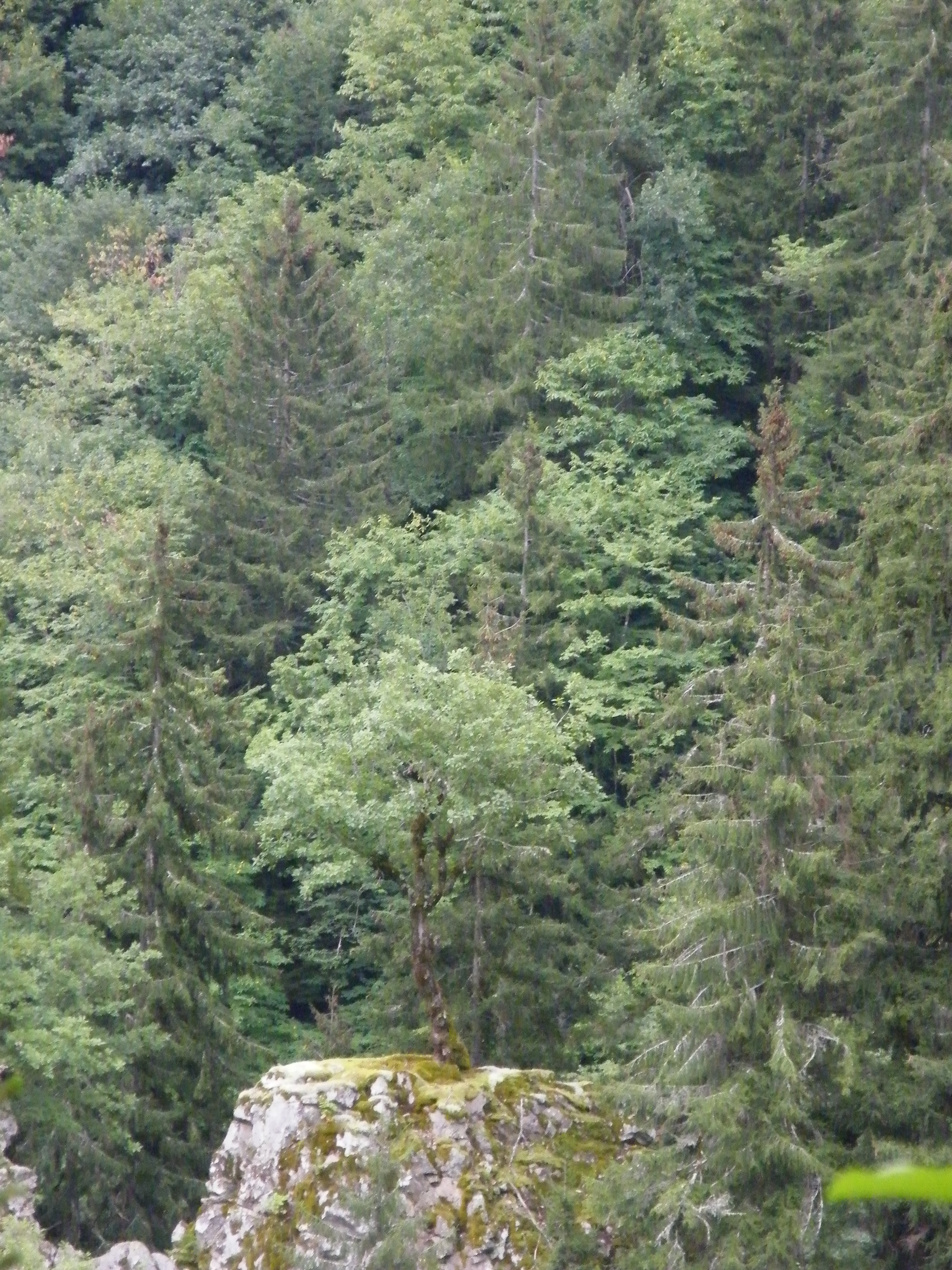
the site of the Camili (Macahel) UNESCO BR

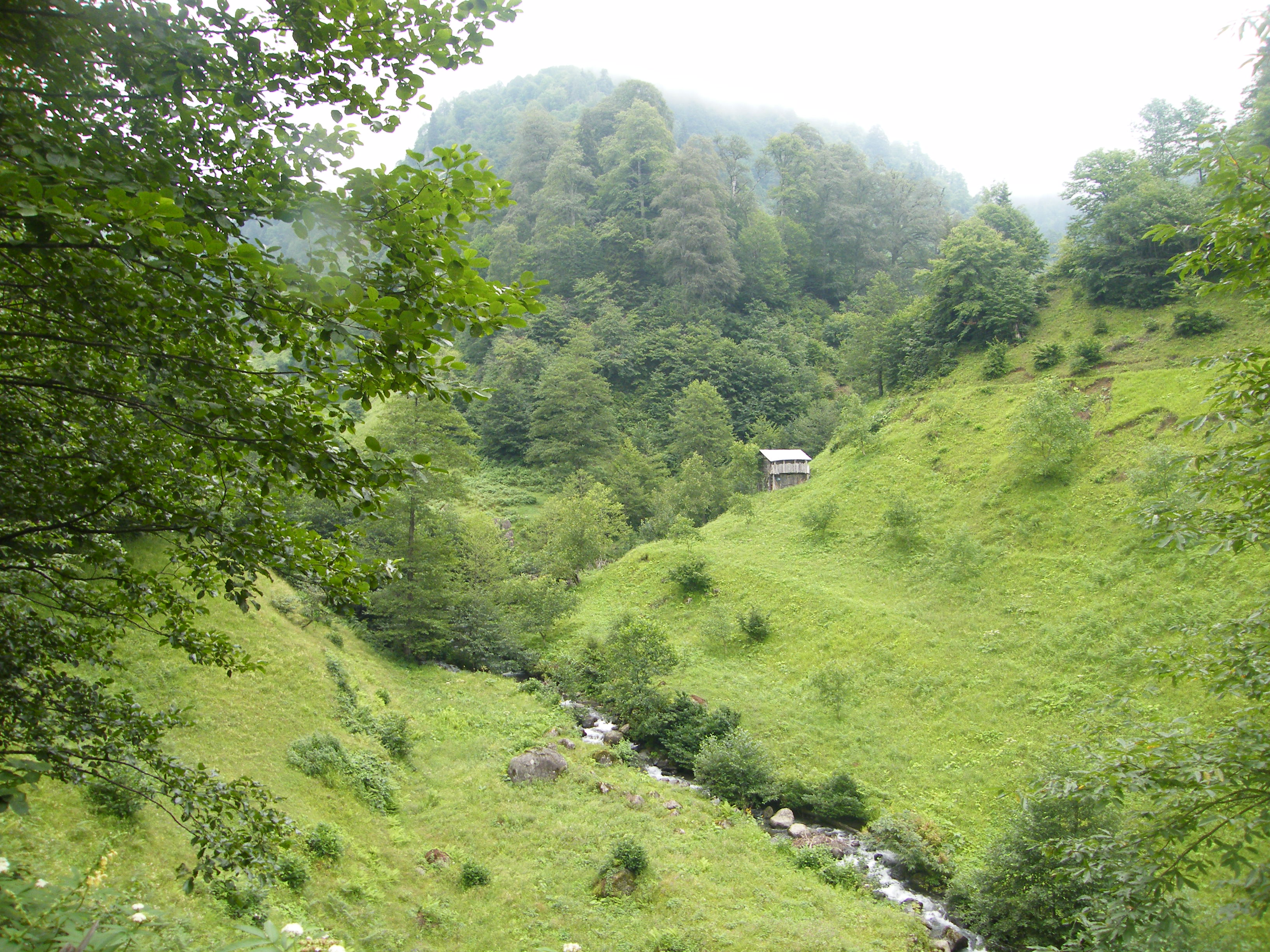
the site of the Camili (Macahel) UNESCO BR

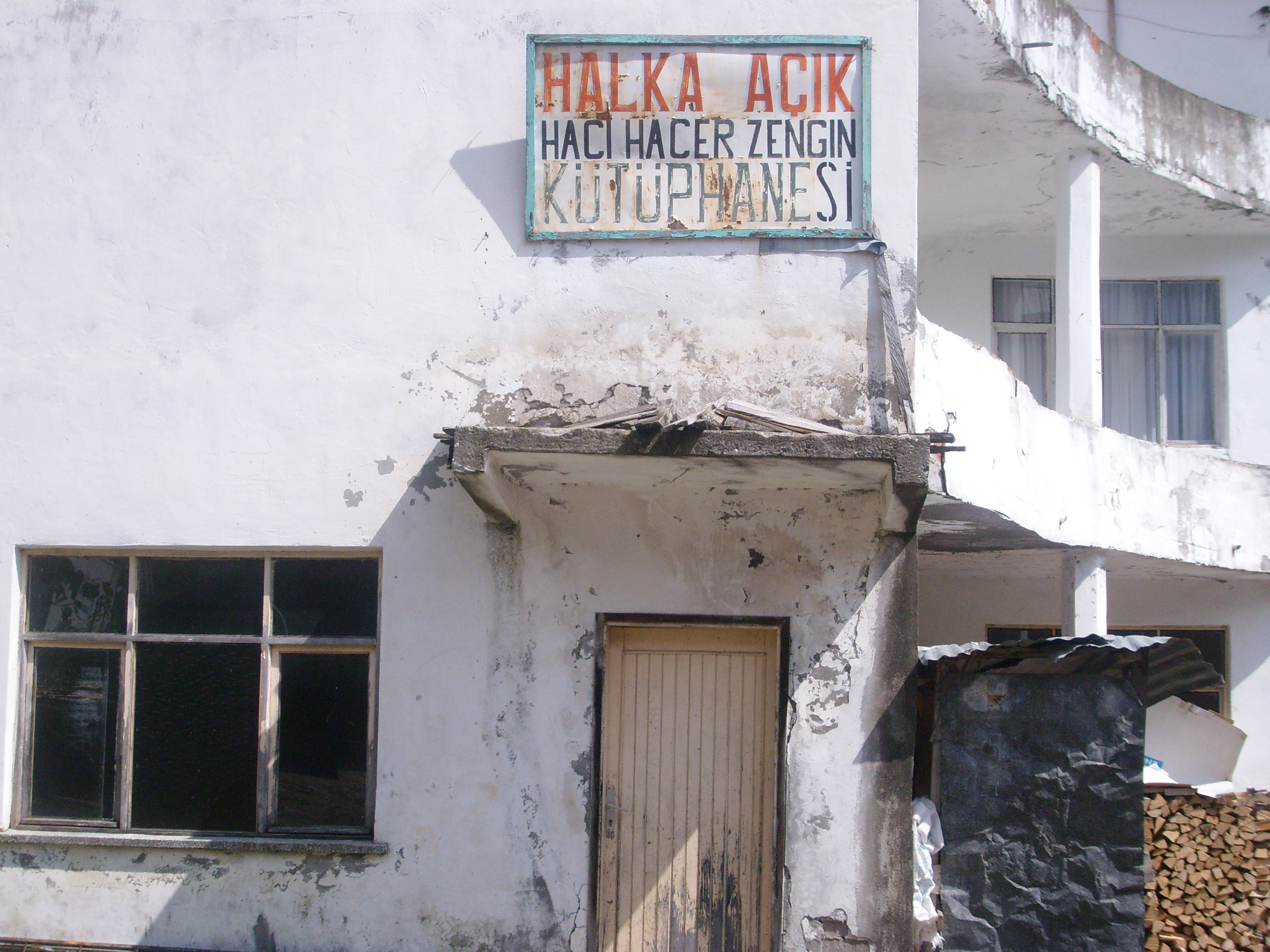
Village library

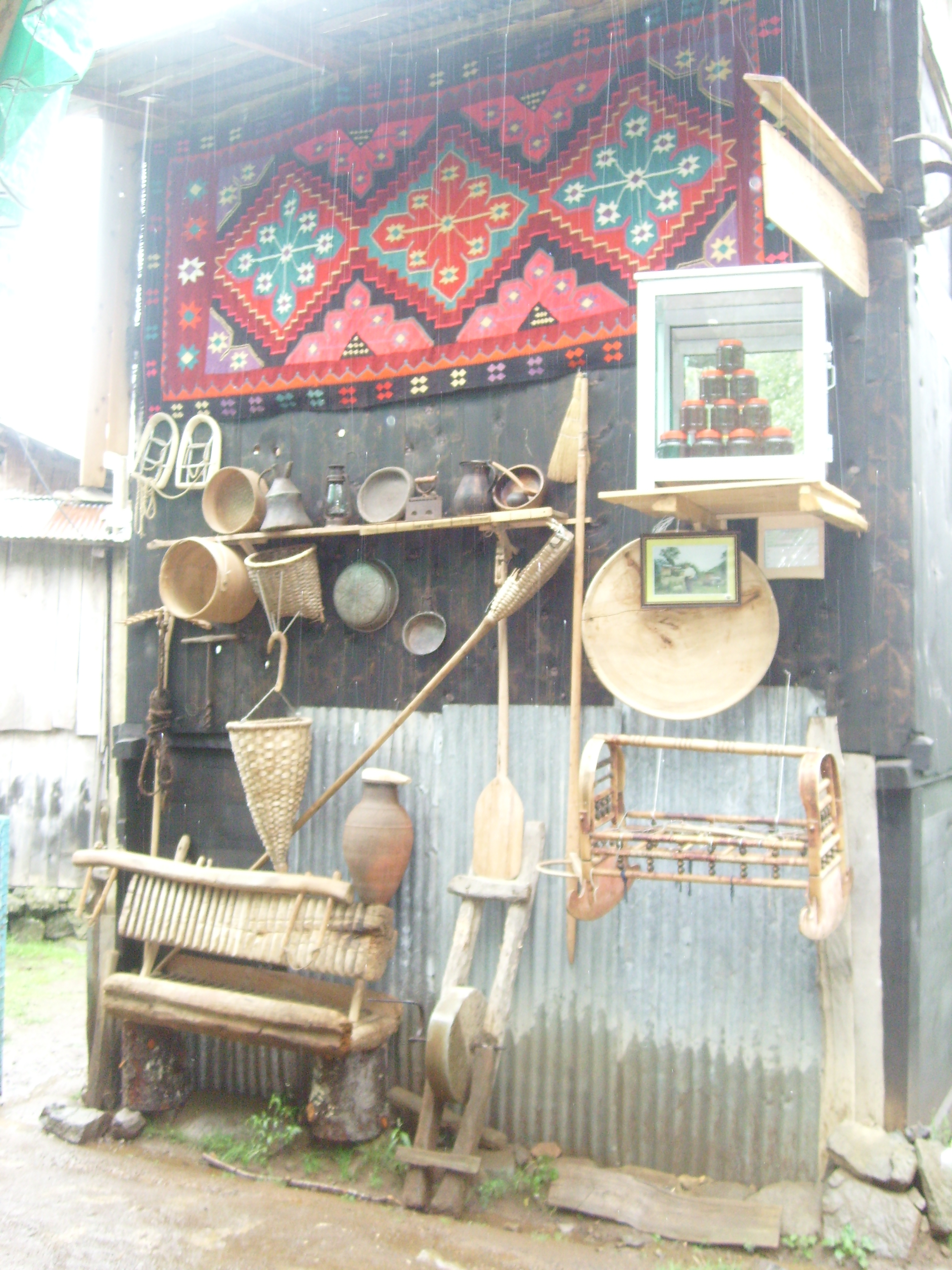
Outside of the traditional village house
