= Karşıköy =

Karşıköy can refer to:

- Karşıköy, Borçka
- Karşıköy, Mudurnu
