= Alaca, Borçka =

Alaca
- Village
- Location within Turkey
- Coordinates: 41°20′58″N 41°44′38″E
- Country: Turkey
- Province: Artvin
- District: Borçka
- Population (2021): 382
- Time zone: UTC+3 (TRT)

Alaca (Georgian:ალაcა), is a village in the Borçka District, Artvin Province, Turkey. Its population is 382 (2021).

Its distance is 41 km to Artvin and 9 km to Borçka.
