= Civan =

Civan, a word meaning "young" in Turkish, may refer to:

- Civan Canova (1955 – 2022), a Turkish actor and playwright
- Civan, Borçka, a village in Turkey
- Civan, a spendthrift character in the traditional Turkish shadow play Karagöz and Hacivat
