= Machakhela National Park =

National park in Georgia

- IUCN category II (national park)
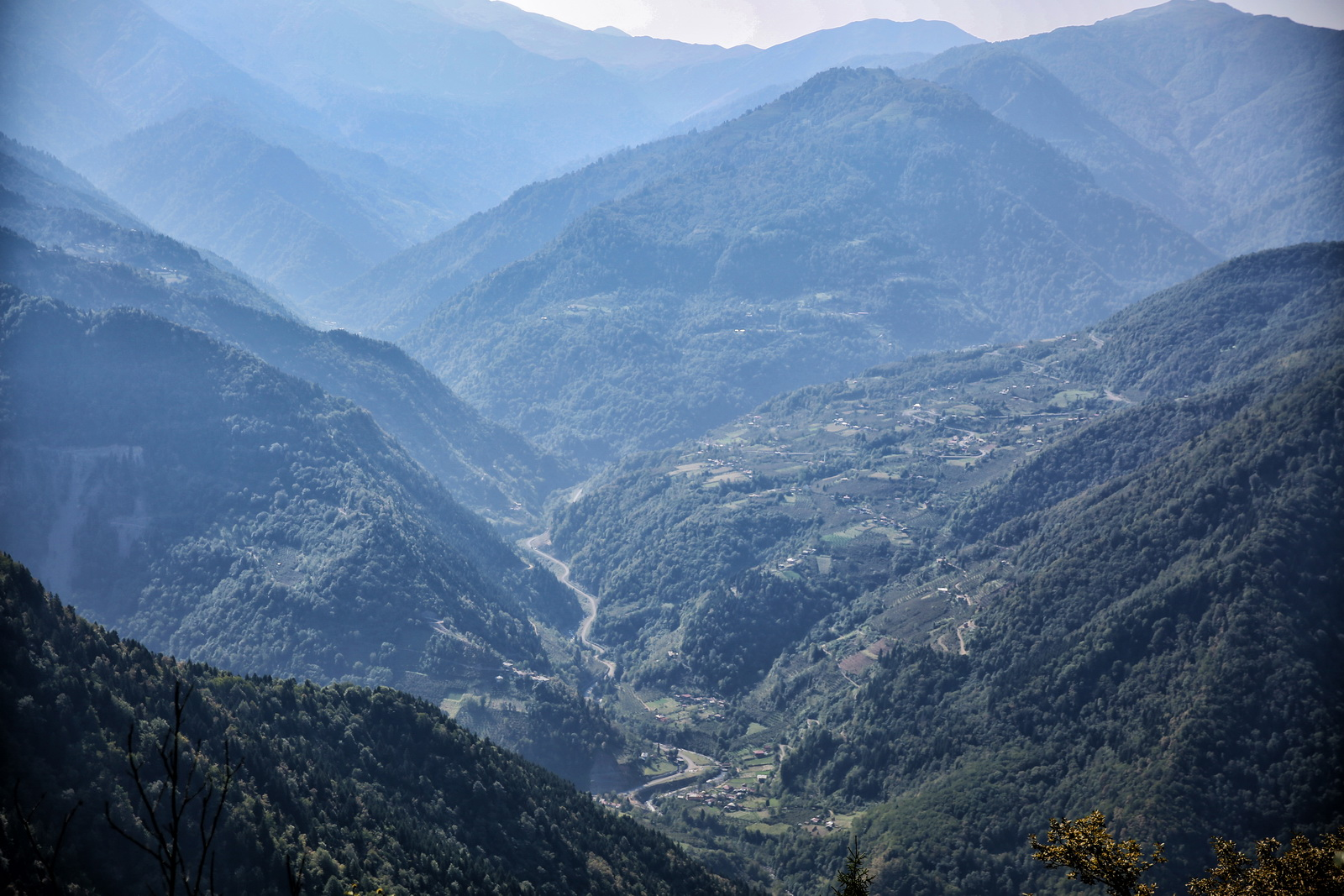
- Machakhela National Park landscape

- Location within Georgia Location within Adjara
- Location: Georgia
- Nearest city: Batumi
- Coordinates: 41°31′12.92″N 41°43′10.81″E
- Area: 130.7 km^{2} (50.5 sq mi)
- Established: 2012
- Governing body: Agency of Protected Areas
- Website: Machakhela National Park

Machakhela National Park (Georgian: მაჭახელას ეროვნული პარკი) is a national park in Adjara, in the valley of Machakhelistsqali, Georgia. The park was established in 2012 with an area of 8733 ha (hectares).

Machakhela National Park provides for the preservation of unique biological and landscape biodiversity, the long-term protection of ecosystem of Colchic forests, ecological safety and natural and environmental tourism and recreational activities.

== Tourist attractions ==
The Machakhela National Park region features ruins of fortresses in historic region of Machakheli, arch bridges and winepresses. From the slopes of Mtavarangelozi mountain there are views of Batumi and Machakhela gorge. A Park visitor center is located in the village Acharisagmarti, Khelvachauri Municipality.

== See also ==
- List of protected areas of Georgia
- Euxine–Colchic broadleaf forests
- Machakheli
