= Kayadibi, Borçka =

Kayadibi
- Village
- Location within Turkey
- Coordinates: 41.4725°N 41.6856°E
- Country: Turkey
- Province: Artvin
- District: Borçka
- Population (2021): 146
- Time zone: UTC+3 (TRT)

Kayadibi is a village in the Borçka District, Artvin Province, Turkey. Its population is 146 (2021). Kayadibi is a small rural village located about 13 km from Borçka town center and around 35 km from Artvin, in a mountainous area with a humid coastal climate.
