= Güzelyurt, Borçka =

Güzelyurt
- Village
- Location within Turkey
- Country: Turkey
- Province: Artvin
- District: Borçka
- Population (2021): 200
- Time zone: UTC+3 (TRT)

Güzelyurt is a village in the Borçka District, Artvin Province, Turkey. Its population is 200 (2021).
