= Kale, Borçka =

Kale Makret
- Village
- Location within Turkey
- Coordinates: 41.3772°N 41.6220°E
- Country: Turkey
- Province: Artvin
- District: Borçka
- Population (2021): 283
- Time zone: UTC+3 (TRT)

Kale is a village in the Borçka District, Artvin Province, Turkey. Its population is 283 (2021).

== History ==
According to list of villages in Laz language book (2009), name of the village is Makret, which derived from Georgian word "makareti" and means "wedding place". Most villagers are ethnically Laz.
