= Arkaköy, Borçka =

Arkaköy
- Village
- Location within Turkey
- Coordinates: 41°22′N 41°43′E
- Country: Turkey
- Province: Artvin
- District: Borçka
- Population (2021): 256
- Time zone: UTC+3 (TRT)

Arkaköy is a village in the Borçka District, Artvin Province, Turkey. Its population is 256 (2021).
