= Düzenli, Borçka =

Düzenli
- Village
- Location within Turkey
- Coordinates: 41.4626°N 41.8946°E
- Country: Turkey
- Province: Artvin
- District: Borçka
- Population (2021): 235
- Time zone: UTC+3 (TRT)

Düzenli is a village in the Borçka District, Artvin Province, Turkey. Its population is 235 (2021).
