= Güneşli, Borçka =

Güneşli
- Village
- Location within Turkey
- Coordinates: 41.4604°N 41.6864°E
- Country: Turkey
- Province: Artvin
- District: Borçka
- Population (2021): 201
- Time zone: UTC+3 (TRT)

Güneşli is a village in the Borçka District, Artvin Province, Turkey. Its population is 201 (2021).
