= Aralık, Borçka =

Aralık
- Village
- Location within Turkey
- Coordinates: 41.3996°N 41.7397°E
- Country: Turkey
- Province: Artvin
- District: Borçka
- Population (2021): 299
- Time zone: UTC+3 (TRT)

Aralık village in Borçka district of Artvin Province

Aralık is a village in the Borçka District, Artvin Province, Turkey. Its population is 299 (2021).
