= Güreşen =

Güreşen Beğlevan
- Village
- Location within Turkey
- Coordinates: 41°27′N 41°38′E
- Country: Turkey
- Province: Artvin
- District: Borçka
- Elevation: 330 m (1,080 ft)
- Population (2021): 666
- Time zone: UTC+3 (TRT)
- Postal code: 08490
- Area code: 0478

Güreşen, formerly Beglevan, Beğlevan, and Pehlevan is a village in Borçka district of Artvin Province, Turkey. Its population is 666 (2021). It is close to the Georgian border to the east and Çoruh River to the south. The distance to Borçka is 22 kilometres (14 mi) and to Artvin is 54 kilometres (34 mi). Both the former and the present names of the village mean “wrestler”. Main economic activity of the watery village is agriculture.

== Etymology ==
The oldest name of the village is Beghlevani (Laz and Georgian: ბეღლევანი), which might be a combination of the words “begheli” (ბეღელი) and “avani” (ავანი), meaning “barn” and “village/town” respectively.

== History ==
An Ottoman defter from 1835 registered that the village of Beğlevan (Ottoman Turkish: بغلوان) was its own nahiye within Lazistan Sanjak of the Eyalet of Childir.

The village was ceded to Russia as part of the Treaty of Berlin following the Russo-Turkish War (1877–1878). An 1886 Russian census recorded the name of the village as Beglevan (Russian: Беглеван) and that it was assigned to the Gonio uchastok in Batumi okrug of Kutaisi Governorate.

== Demographics ==
Most villagers are ethnically Laz or Hemshin.
