= Borçka District =

District of Artvin Province, Turkey

- District
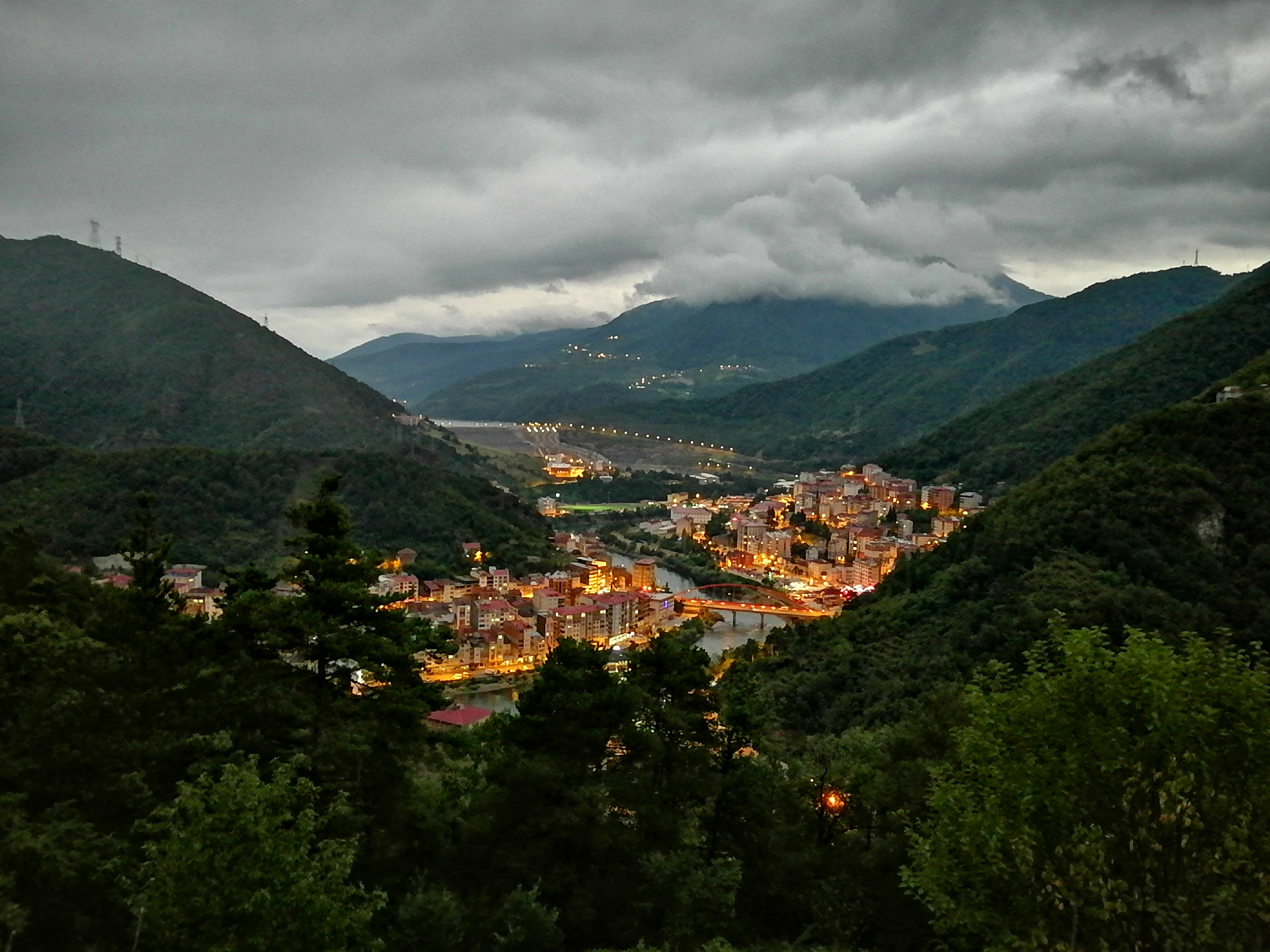
- Borçka

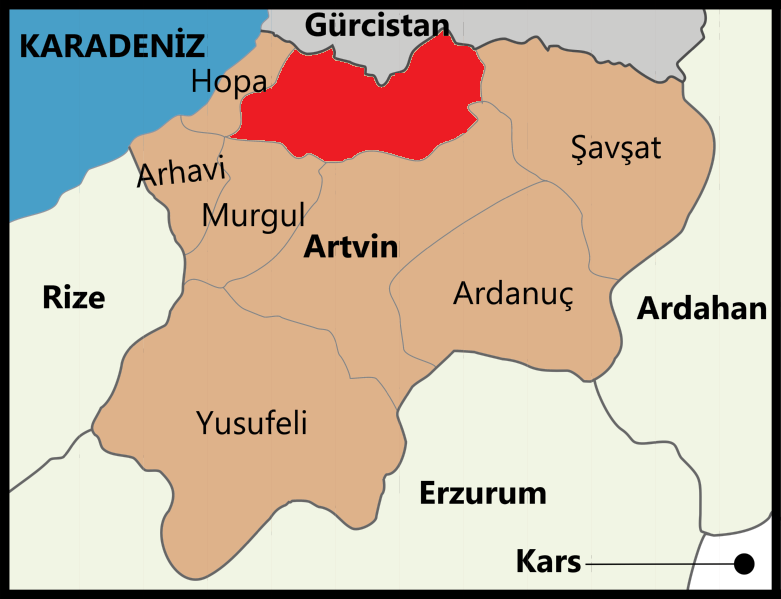
- Map showing Borçka District in Artvin Province

- Location within Turkey
- Coordinates: 41°22′N 41°41′E
- Country: Turkey
- Province: Artvin
- Seat: Borçka

Government
  - Kaymakam: Hakan Contarlı
- Area: 805 km^{2} (311 sq mi)
- Population (2021): 22,030
  - Density: 27.4/km^{2} (70.9/sq mi)
- Time zone: UTC+3 (TRT)
- Website: www.borcka.gov.tr

Borçka District is a district of Artvin Province of Turkey. Its seat is the town Borçka. Its area is 805 km^{2}, and its population is 22,030 (2021).

== Composition ==
There is one municipality in Borçka District:

- Borçka

There are 38 villages in Borçka District:

- Adagül
- Akpınar
- Alaca
- Ambarlı
- Aralık
- Arkaköy
- Atanoğlu
- Avcılar
- Balcı
- Boğazköy
- Camili
- Çavuşlu
- Çaylıköy
- Çifteköprü
- Civan
- Demirciler
- Düzenli
- Düzköy
- Efeler
- Fındıklı
- Güneşli
- Güreşen
- Güzelyurt
- İbrikli
- Kale
- Karşıköy
- Kayadibi
- Kayalar
- Kaynarca
- Maralköy
- Muratlı
- Örücüler
- Şerefiye
- Taraklı
- Uğurköy
- Yeşilköy
- Zedoban
- Zorlu
