= Çaylıköy, Borçka =

Çaylıköy Cgirazen
- Village
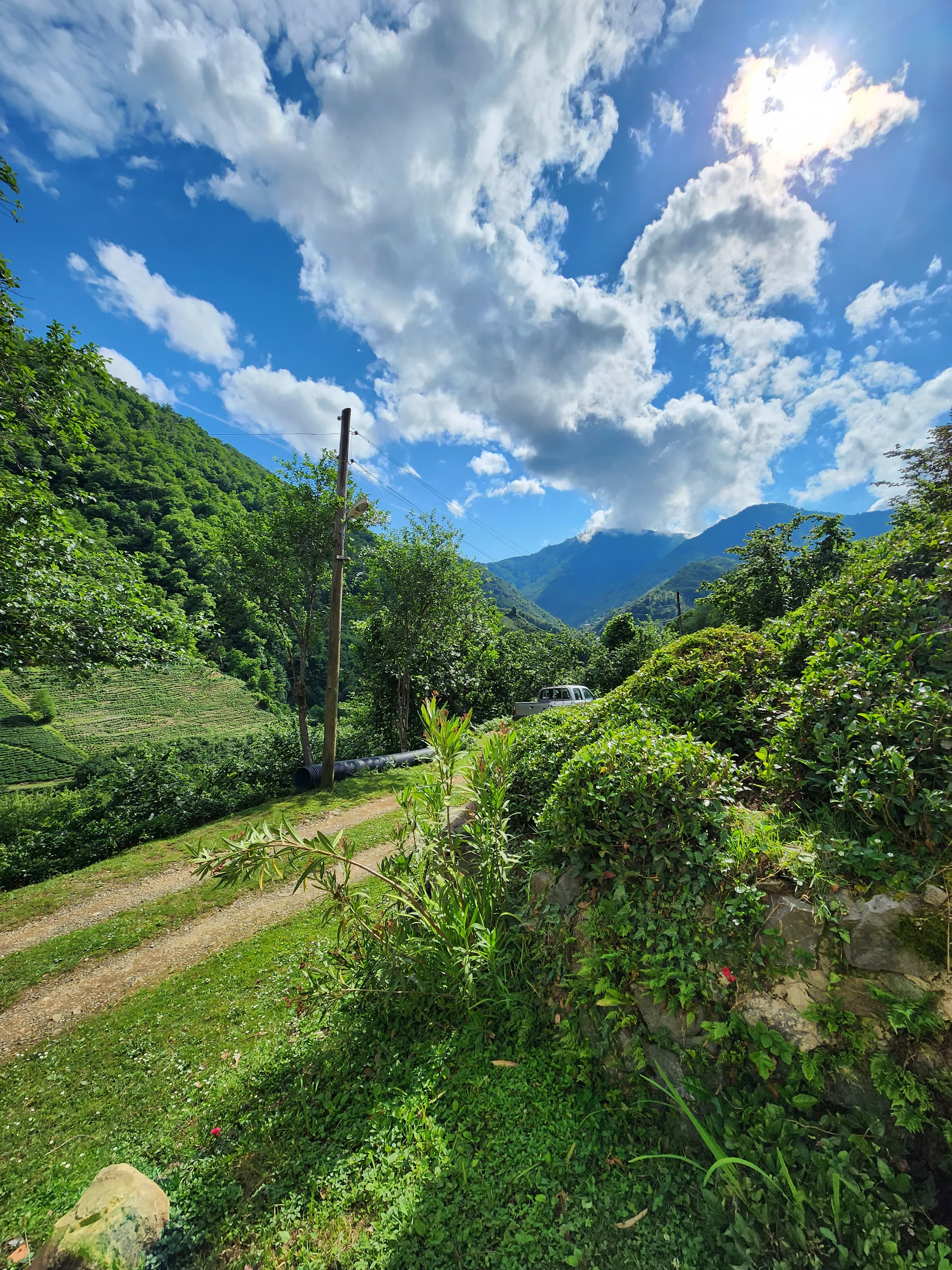

- Location within Turkey
- Coordinates: 41°26′20″N 41°36′35″E
- Country: Turkey
- Province: Artvin
- District: Borçka
- Population (2021): 408
- Time zone: UTC+3 (TRT)

Çaylıköy is a village in the Borçka District, Artvin Province, Turkey. Its population is 408 (2021).

== History ==
According to list of villages in Laz language book (2009), name of the village is Cgirazen, which derived from Laz language word "cgirazeni" and means "good plain". Most villagers are ethnically Hemshin.
