= Maralköy, Borçka =

Maralköy
- Village
- Location within Turkey
- Coordinates: 41°29′N 41°56′E
- Country: Turkey
- Province: Artvin
- District: Borçka
- Population (2021): 265
- Time zone: UTC+3 (TRT)

Maralköy is a village in the Borçka District, Artvin Province, Turkey. Its population is 265 (2021).
