= Şerefiye, Borçka =

Şerefiye Oxordia
- Village
- Location within Turkey
- Country: Turkey
- Province: Artvin
- District: Borçka
- Population (2021): 199
- Time zone: UTC+3 (TRT)

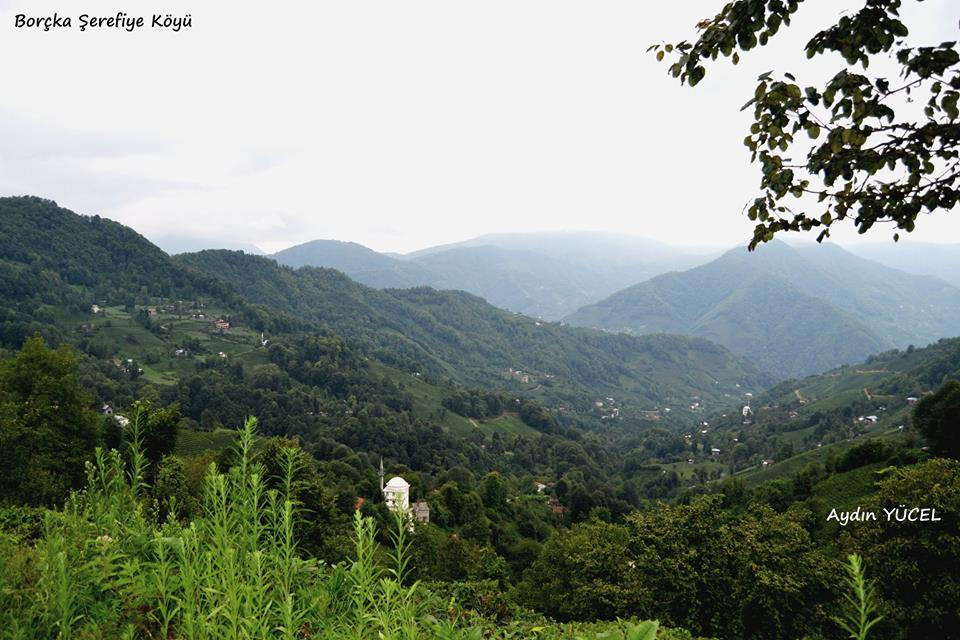
An image of Şerefiye

Şerefiye is a village in the Borçka District, Artvin Province, Turkey. Its population is 199 (2021).

== History ==
According to list of villages in Laz language book (2009), name of the village is Oxordiya, which derived from Laz language word "Oxordia" and means "big house". Most villagers are ethnically Laz.
