= Kaynarca, Borçka =

Kaynarca
- Village
- Location within Turkey
- Coordinates: 41.3381°N 41.7916°E
- Country: Turkey
- Province: Artvin
- District: Borçka
- Population (2021): 458
- Time zone: UTC+3 (TRT)

Kaynarca is a village in the Borçka District, Artvin Province, Turkey. Its population is 458 (2021).
