= Avcılar, Borçka =

Avcılar
- Village
- Location within Turkey
- Coordinates: 41.3064°N 41.7176°E
- Country: Turkey
- Province: Artvin
- District: Borçka
- Population (2021): 136
- Time zone: UTC+3 (TRT)

Avcılar is a village in the Borçka District, Artvin Province, Turkey. Its population is 136 (2021).
