= Çavuşlu, Borçka =

Çavuşlu
- Village
- Location within Turkey
- Coordinates: 41.4492°N 41.6950°E
- Country: Turkey
- Province: Artvin
- District: Borçka
- Population (2021): 292
- Time zone: UTC+3 (TRT)

Çavuşlu is a village in the Borçka District, Artvin Province, Turkey. Its population is 292 (2021).
