= İbrikli, Borçka =

İbrikli
- Village
- Location within Turkey
- Coordinates: 41°20′N 41°43′E
- Country: Turkey
- Province: Artvin
- District: Borçka
- Population (2021): 361
- Time zone: UTC+3 (TRT)

İbrikli is a village in the Borçka District, Artvin Province, Turkey. Its population is 361 (2021).
