= Uğurköy, Borçka =

Uğurköy
- Village
- Hiking route nearby

- Location within Turkey
- Coordinates: 41.4797°N 41.9928°E
- Country: Turkey
- Province: Artvin
- District: Borçka
- Population (2021): 234
- Time zone: UTC+3 (TRT)

Uğurköy (Georgian: აკრია Akria) is a village in the Borçka District, Artvin Province, Turkey. Its population is 234 (2021).
