= Taraklı, Borçka =

Taraklı
- Village
- Location within Turkey
- Coordinates: 41.3349°N 41.6829°E
- Country: Turkey
- Province: Artvin
- District: Borçka
- Population (2021): 220
- Time zone: UTC+3 (TRT)

Taraklı is a village in the Borçka District, Artvin Province, Turkey. Its population is 220 (2021).
