= Zorlu, Borçka =

Zorlu
- Village
- Location within Turkey
- Coordinates: 41.2937°N 41.7098°E
- Country: Turkey
- Province: Artvin
- District: Borçka
- Population (2021): 232
- Time zone: UTC+3 (TRT)

Zorlu is a village in the Borçka District, Artvin Province, Turkey. Its population is 232 (2021).
