= Düzköy, Borçka =

Düzköy
- Village
- Location within Turkey
- Coordinates: 41.3769°N 41.6100°E
- Country: Turkey
- Province: Artvin
- District: Borçka
- Population (2021): 677
- Time zone: UTC+3 (TRT)

Düzköy (Laz: ჩხალა/Çxala; Georgian: ჩხალა/Chkhala) is a village in the Borçka District, Artvin Province, Turkey. Its population is 677 (2021).
