= Demirciler, Borçka =

Demirciler İçkale
- Village
- Location within Turkey
- Coordinates: 41°23′N 41°38′E
- Country: Turkey
- Province: Artvin
- District: Borçka
- Elevation: 460 m (1,510 ft)
- Population (2021): 784
- Time zone: UTC+3 (TRT)
- Postal code: 08490
- Area code: 0478

Demirciler (Laz: Çxala) is a village in Borçka District of Artvin Province, Turkey. Its population is 784 (2021). Situated in the forests, it is to the northeast of Çoruh River. The distance to Borçka is 5 kilometres (3.1 mi) and to Artvin is 37 kilometres (23 mi). The history of the village goes back to Sakas, Mingrelians, Seljukids, and Laz people. The present name of the village means blacksmiths, and it refers to the profession of many village residents.
