= Atanoğlu, Borçka =

Atanoğlu
- Village
- Location within Turkey
- Coordinates: 41°24′N 41°46′E
- Country: Turkey
- Province: Artvin
- District: Borçka
- Population (2021): 199
- Time zone: UTC+3 (TRT)

Atanoğlu is a village in the Borçka District, Artvin Province, Turkey. Its population is 199 (2021).
