= Ambarlı, Borçka =

Ambarlı
- Village
- Location within Turkey
- Coordinates: 41.3234°N 41.7025°E
- Country: Turkey
- Province: Artvin
- District: Borçka
- Population (2021): 170
- Time zone: UTC+3 (TRT)

Ambarlı is a village in the Borçka District, Artvin Province, Turkey. Its population is 170 (2021).
