= Örücüler, Borçka =

Örücüler Archveti
- Village
- Location within Turkey
- Coordinates: 41°25′N 41°41′E
- Country: Turkey
- Province: Artvin
- District: Borçka
- Population (2021): 112
- Time zone: UTC+3 (TRT)

Örücüler is a village in the Borçka District, Artvin Province, Turkey. Its population is 112 (2021).

== History ==
According to list of villages in Laz language book (2009), name of the village is Archveti. Most villagers are ethnically Laz.
