= Yeşilköy, Borçka =

Yeşilköy
- Village
- Location within Turkey
- Coordinates: 41.4170°N 41.6466°E
- Country: Turkey
- Province: Artvin
- District: Borçka
- Population (2021): 133
- Time zone: UTC+3 (TRT)

Yeşilköy is a village in the Borçka District, Artvin Province, Turkey. Its population is 133 (2021).

== History ==
Most villagers are ethnically Laz.
