= Akpınar, Borçka =

Akpınar
- Village
- Location within Turkey
- Coordinates: 41.3273°N 41.6544°E
- Country: Turkey
- Province: Artvin
- District: Borçka
- Population (2021): 232
- Time zone: UTC+3 (TRT)

Akpınar is a village in the Borçka District, Artvin Province, Turkey. Its population is 232 (2021).
