= Kayalar, Borçka =

Kayalar
- Village
- Location within Turkey
- Coordinates: 41.4585°N 41.9235°E
- Country: Turkey
- Province: Artvin
- District: Borçka
- Population (2021): 105
- Time zone: UTC+3 (TRT)

Kayalar is a village in the Borçka District, Artvin Province, Turkey. Its population is 105 (2021).
