= Fındıklı, Borçka =

Fındıklı Saxandro
- Village
- Location within Turkey
- Coordinates: 41°23′59.2″N 41°36′54.3″E
- Country: Turkey
- Province: Artvin
- District: Borçka
- Population (2021): 251
- Time zone: UTC+3 (TRT)
- Postal code: 08400
- Area code: 0466

Fındıklı is a village in the Borçka District, Artvin Province, Turkey. Its population is 251 (2021). It is 42 km (26 mi) from the provincial capital city of Artvin and 10 km (6 mi) from the center of the District of Borçka. Most villagers are ethnically Laz.

== Name ==
The name of the village probably comes from the cultivation of hazelnuts (Turkish: fındık) in the area. According to a Turkish source, old name of the village is Saxandro.

== Economy ==
The village's economy is based on agriculture, as well as hazelnut, tea, and fruit cultivation.

== Muhtars ==
After being incorporated, the village has elected muhtars (head of the village) since 1984.

- 2004 – Mustafa Eksilmez

== Infrastructure ==
Fındıklı has an elementary school, but it is not in use; students are transported to another populated area for their education. The village has no drinking or tap water system, and it does not have a sewer network. The village does not have a postal service (PTT) branch, but it does have a PTT agent to carry mail in and out of the village. The main road leading into Fındıklı is paved, and the village has stable and reliable electricity and telephone service.
