= Adagül, Borçka =

Adagül
- Village
- Location within Turkey
- Coordinates: 41°19′N 41°45′E
- Country: Turkey
- Province: Artvin
- District: Borçka
- Population (2021): 188
- Time zone: UTC+3 (TRT)

Adagül (Georgian: ადაგვა, romanized: adagva) is a village in the Borçka District, Artvin Province, Turkey. Its population is 188 (2021).
