= Efeler, Borçka =

Efeler
- Village
- Location in Turkey
- Coordinates: 41.4392°N 41.9254°E
- Country: Turkey
- Province: Artvin
- District: Borçka
- Population (2021): 208
- Time zone: UTC+3 (TRT)

Efeler is a village in the Borçka District, Artvin Province, Turkey. Its population is 208 (2021).
