= Balcı, Borçka =

Balcı Bagen
- Village
- Location within Turkey
- Coordinates: 41.3023°N 41.8126°E
- Country: Turkey
- Province: Artvin
- District: Borçka
- Population (2021): 364
- Time zone: UTC+3 (TRT)

Balcı is a village in the Borçka District, Artvin Province, Turkey. Its population is 364 (2021).

== History ==
According to list of villages in Laz language book (2009), name of the village is Bagen, which is derived from Laz language word "bageni" and means "plateau house". Most villagers are ethnically Georgian.
