= Muratlı, Borçka =

Muratlı
- Village
- Location within Turkey
- Coordinates: 41.4796°N 41.7096°E
- Country: Turkey
- Province: Artvin
- District: Borçka
- Population (2021): 300
- Time zone: UTC+3 (TRT)

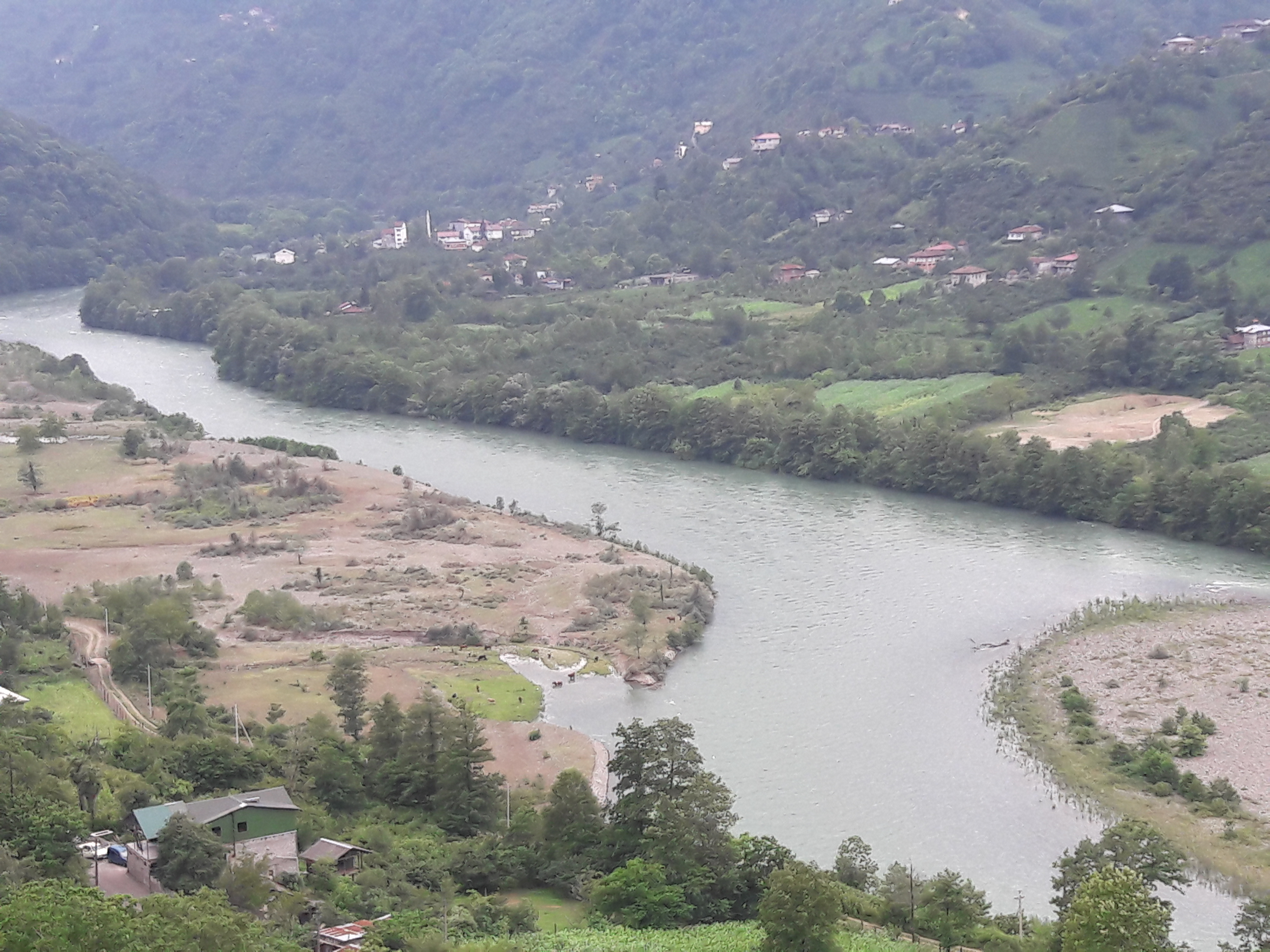
Muratli village pictured from Georgia

Muratlı is a village in the Borçka District, Artvin Province, Turkey. Its population is 300 (2021).
