= Karşıköy, Borçka =

Karşıköy
- Village
- Location within Turkey
- Coordinates: 41°21′36″N 41°40′48″E
- Country: Turkey
- Province: Artvin
- District: Borçka
- Population (2021): 474
- Time zone: UTC+3 (TRT)

Karşıköy is a village in the Borçka District, Artvin Province, Turkey. Its population is 474 (2021).
