= Camili, Borçka =

Camili
- Village
- Location in Turkey
- Coordinates: 41°28′43″N 41°53′56″E
- Country: Turkey
- Province: Artvin
- District: Borçka
- Population (2021): 181
- Time zone: UTC+3 (TRT)

Camili (original Georgian name ხერთვისი, Khertvisi) is a village in Borçka District of Artvin Province. Its population is 181 (2021). Camili is the official name given by Turkish authorities in 1925. It literally means "(the place) with the mosque". Camili is also the name of a vicinity which includes five villages: Düzenli (Zedvake), Efeler (Eprati), Kayalar (Kvabitavi), Maral (Mindieti), and Uğur (Akria). Camili and the other villages of the vicinity were settled in Machakheli valley, so this vicinity is also known as Machakheli.
