= Civan, Borçka =

Civan
- Village
- Location within Turkey
- Coordinates: 41.3313°N 41.6585°E
- Country: Turkey
- Province: Artvin
- District: Borçka
- Population (2021): 142
- Time zone: UTC+3 (TRT)

Civan is a village in the Borçka District, Artvin Province, Turkey. Its population is 142 (2021).
