= Machakhelistsqali =

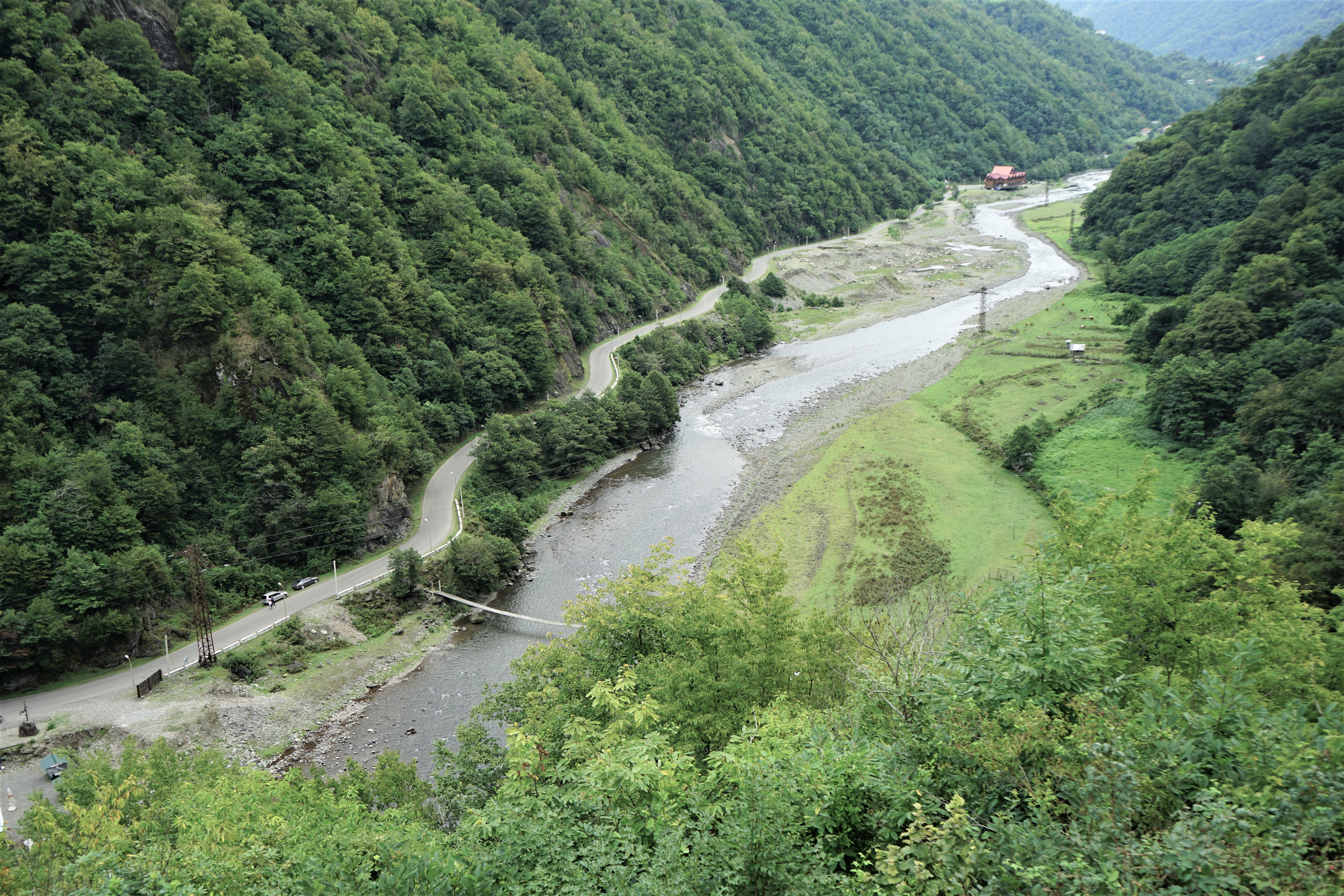
- Native name: მაჭახელისწყალი (Georgian)

Location
- Country: Georgia, Turkey

Physical characteristics
- Source
  - location: Artvin Province, Turkey
- Mouth: Çoruh
  - location: Adjara, Georgia
  - coordinates: 41.5186°N 41.7189°E
- Length: 37 km (23 mi)

Basin features
- Progression: Çoruh→ Black Sea

The Machakhelistsqali or Machakhlitskali (Georgian: მაჭახელისწყალი, Mač’axelisc’q’ali; Turkish: Maçahel Suyu) is a river that flows from the Artvin Province in Turkey to Adjara autonomous republic of Georgia. It's a right tributary of the Çoruh (Chorokhi).
