= Borçka =

- Municipality
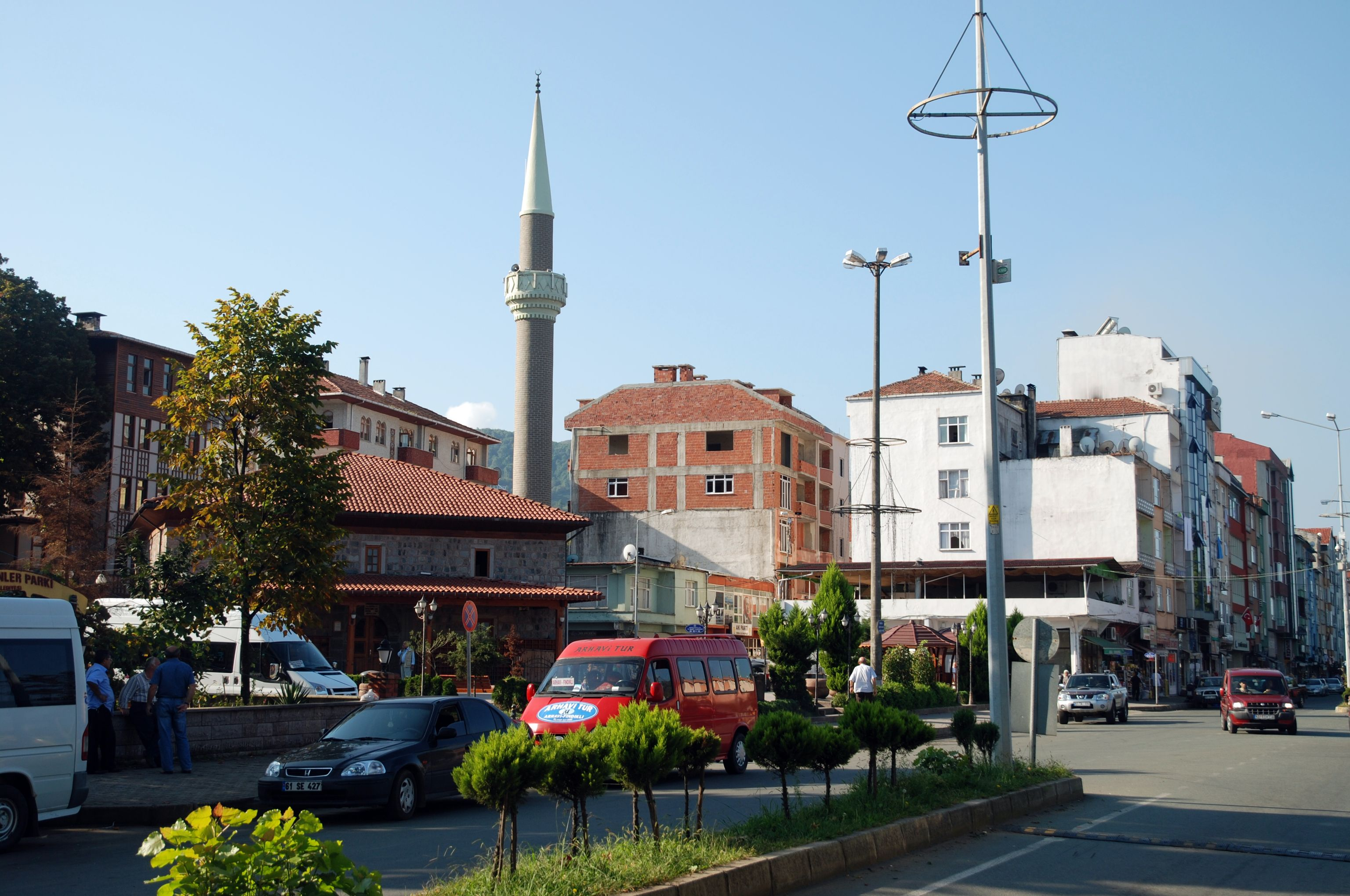

- Location within Turkey
- Coordinates: 41°21′49″N 41°40′45″E
- Country: Turkey
- Province: Artvin
- District: Borçka

Government
  - Mayor: Ercan Orhan (CHP)
- Elevation: 123 m (404 ft)
- Population (2021): 11,409
- Time zone: UTC+3 (TRT)
- Postal code: 08400
- Climate: Cfb
- Website: www.borcka.bel.tr

Borçka (Laz and Georgian: ბორჩხა, romanized: Borchkha) is a town in Artvin Province in the Black Sea region of Turkey, on the border with Georgia. It is the seat of Borçka District. Its population is 11,409 (2021).

Borçka is reached by a winding road up from the Black Sea coast, alongside the Çoruh River (Nigali valley). There is a medieval stone arched bridge across the river just west of the town.

Borçka Lake is a popular excursion from Artvin.

== Etymology ==
Borçka’s old name is Porchkha (Georgian: ფორჩხა). The origin of this toponym is not known for sure—though it is possible that it is derived from the Georgian word "porchhi" (ფორჩხი), which can mean “thicket” or “small forest”. Also, words such as "borchkha" (ბორჩხა) meaning “dry wood” in Mingrelian and "borchkhalo" (ბორჩხალო) meaning “frost” in the Gurian dialect of Georgian could be related to this name. The name Porchkha has evolved over time into Borchha, Borcha, Borchkha, and the current Turkish spelling of “Borçka”.

== History ==
=== Middle ages ===
The settlement of what is today Borçka may have been mentioned in Trapezuntine sources as “Bourzo”. The area remained in Trapezuntine possession until 1364 when it was captured by the Kingdom of Georgia.

=== Ottoman rule ===
Borçka itself was first directly mentioned in 18th century Georgian geographer and historian Vakhushti of Kartli’s Description of the Kingdom of Georgia by the name Porchkha as a large town west of the Çoruh (Note: Georgian: ჭოროხი, romanized: cho’rokhi; often anglicized as Chorokh) within the historical Georgian region of Klarjeti. At the time, the town was located within the Eyalet of Childir in the Ottoman Empire. The region where the town lies today was a part of Samtskhe-Saatabago prior to its annexation by the Ottomans in the late 16th century. Despite being first mentioned fairly recently compared to nearby settlements, the presence of a church in the Borçka Castle indicates that the structure was likely built before Ottoman conquest, thus it can be said that Borçka was probably already settled before.

The town was recorded again in an 1835 Ottoman defter as “Borçha” (Ottoman Turkish: بوچخە). The defter recorded that the male population of the town was 219, and placed it in the nahiye of Beğlevan in the sanjak of Lazistan of the Childir eyalet.

Georgian geographer and Russian army general Giorgi Kazbegi wrote in 1874 that Borçha did not resemble a typical village as it had around 80 households. He noted that the villagers did not engage in agricultural or animal husbandry, therefore the settlement lacked any cattle or horses. Instead, the residents were engaged in pottery and boating, and the boats replaced the use of horses as transportation.

In the 1876 salname for the vilayet of Trebizond, the name of the town was recorded as “Borcha” (Ottoman Turkish: بورجخە) instead of the previous “Borçha”. The salname placed the locality within the nahiye of Gönye, sanjak of Lazistan, Trebizond vilayet. (Note: the Eyalet of Childir was dissolved in 1845) The total population counted together with the nearby settlement of Situret/Tzitureti were a total of 400 people living in 110 households, along with the new presence of taxable livestock, specifically 10 goats, 2 horses, 20 cows and 10 oxen.

=== Russian rule ===
The Russian Empire occupied the town during the Russo-Turkish War (1877–1878) and was later ceded to Russia in the Treaty of Berlin (1878). Russian officials assigned the village to the Batumi okrug within the Kutaisi Governorate. An 1886 census recorded the town as “Borchkha” (Russian: Борчха) populated by 147 men and 149 women from 52 households, totaling 296 people. The ethnic makeup of Borchkha was entirely made up of Muslim Georgians, or Adjarians.

Georgian historian Zakaria Chichinadze visited the town in 1893 and wrote that there were 60 households in Borchkha, two mosques and a few shops, a castle on a rock, and that Ivane Caiani lived in the town. Indeed, Caiani was a Georgian soldier in the Russian army who sent articles to Georgian newspapers while he was on duty there, providing extensive information about Borchkha and its surroundings at that time. In one of these articles, Caiani states that the people living in Borchkha village and some parts of the Chorokh coast earned their living only by boating. He writes that another source of income for the people of Borchkha was pottery. Chichinadze noted that around 40 households had emigrated from Borchkha after Russian annexation, such was the case with many other towns.

In 1918, amidst the chaos following World War I and the ongoing Russian Civil War, Batum oblast came under the control of the newly declared Democratic Republic of Georgia. After local unrest, Ottoman forces entered Batumi and imposed the Treaty of Batum, which returned the area back to the Ottomans. The next year, however, the area was occupied by the British Empire. The British withdrew in 1920 and the province was returned to Georgia. Less than a year after, Kemalist forces under the command of Kâzım Karabekir attempted to take Artvin, but were defeated by Georgian forces. In the end, the Bolshevik Red Army invaded Georgia to annex and overthrow the Menshevik government, and the area where Borchkha is located was given to Turkey in the Treaty of Kars.

=== After Turkish annexation ===
Borçka became the center of the district of the same name on July 7, 1921. A census conducted the following year shows the livâ of Artvin consisted of the merkez (central) kaza and the remaining kazas of Borçka and Şavşat. Borçka kaza included the nahiyes of Macahel, Maradidi (Muratlı), and Murgul, in addition to its own central nahiye. The census showed 130 people living in the town of Borçka and a total of 4,373 people living in the rest of the Borçka district. The population of the central district consisted of a mix of Georgians and Laz people, while the population of Maradidi, Macahel and Murgul districts consisted of Georgians. Borçka was demoted from a kaza to a nahiye on June 26, 1926. During this time, it was recorded that there were 40 villages within the borders of Borçka district. Borçka was promoted to a kaza again on 28 May 1928.

Borçka kaza was connected to the Çoruh vilayet in the 1940 general census. The vilayet of Çoruh included the kazas of Borçka, Hopa, Şavşat, Yusufeli, and its capital kaza of Artvin. Borçka kaza had a population of 17,844.
