= Cerattepe =

Hill in Artvin, northeastern Turkey

Coordinates: 41.1636°N 41.7913°E

Cerattepe is a hill that is very close to the town of Artvin, in northeastern Turkey. It is noted for its unique biodiversity and natural beauty, as well as being the source of water supply for the town. It has been the subject of controversy and protests since 1992 for a project to construct a copper and gold mine at the site.

== Geography ==
=== Location and natural heritage ===
The hill lies 4 km to the southeast of the town centre of Artvin at an altitude of 1700 m. The area is very hilly and covered with forests. To around 600 m northwest of the area lies the Hatila Valley National Park, a site that is rare in Turkey in terms of the biodiversity of its fauna and flora. "Artvin Kafkasör Area of Protecting and Developing Tourism", a recreational area covered with forests, is located at part of the area. Underneath and around the hill, including in the area determined for mine construction, lie a number of water resources which are used for supplying water to Artvin.

According to reports by the General Directorate of Mineral Research and Exploration (Maden Tetkik Arama, MTA), the hill and the mine construction area has a heightened risk of landslides. Other studies have shown signs of a number of old landslides and a continued soil movement in the area. The area consists of volcanic sedimentary rocks, with a concentration of basic volcanic rocks, some of which have been loosened and present a high risk of landslides. The soil depth varies between 20 and 50 cm and soil erosion is a consistent problem.

According to Cumhuriyet, in Cerattepe and its surroundings, there are 600 plant species. 26 of these species are endemic and 24 of them are rare; thus, the area is home to 50 species in dire need of conservation. Cerattepe is also on the migration path of birds. A 2005 study by scholars from Karadeniz Technical University, published by Istanbul University, found 545 taxa from 84 families in the area, 30 of which were endemic.

=== Metal deposits ===
Cerattepe is home to deposits of copper, gold, silver and mercury. The reserves are 1000 in length and 150 m in thickness. The deposits are the richest deposits in a single site in Artvin Province, as around 202,800 tonnes of pure copper metal can be extracted from the deposits, as well as 37 tonnes of gold and more than 1200 tonnes of silver. The copper deposits contain sulfide minerals. The gold deposits lie above the copper deposits.

== Mine construction ==
=== History ===
The first drills in the area took place in 1992. According to environmentalists, due to the pollution created by the drills between 1994 and 1995, there was an increased incidence of animal deaths, which led to the establishment of the Green Artvin Association (Turkish: Yeşil Artvin Derneği) in 1995. Over the years, the area was subjected to exploration by the MTA and the Canadian mining companies Cominco and Inmet. In the 1990s, the licence for mining operations in the area was given to Inmet. In 1995, a project to start mining by 1997 was unveiled. Milliyet wrote at the time that the forests in the area would not recover for 200 years and compared the project with that in Murgul, where the wastes of a copper mine turned the Çoruh River "grey for 20 kilometres". It stressed that some of the environmental destruction would be irreversible.

On 4 November 2007, around 1000 residents protested against planned mining operations in Cerattepe. As a result of the negative reaction of the people of Artvin and an appeal by the Green Artvin Association, the licence was revoked in 2008, a decision that was upheld in 2009. Inmet has also been punished for releasing water containing heavy metals to the environment. However, after a law change passed by the ruling AKP that allowed licences for areas in which licences had previously been revoked by a court to be re-issued, bidding for an operating licence was opened in 2011. The tender took place on 17 February and was won by Özaltın Holding by 97,638,000 Turkish liras; the second bidder was Eti Mining owned by Cengiz Holding of Mehmet Cengiz. Özaltın Holding later gave the licence to Cengiz Holding, with which they cooperate, showing lack of experience in the mining sector as its reasoning. In 2015, Cengiz Holding submitted an environmental report to the government, which was approved. This provoked a resistance movement in Artvin. Residents held vigil in Cerattepe continuously from 21 June 2015 to February 2016.

In February 2016, construction efforts for the mine in Cerattepe began. This sparked large protests that began on 16 February 2016. On 16 February, 2000 protesters gathered in Cerattepe. The protests continued with thousands of people marching every day, despite the violent crackdown by the police. On 18 February, whilst the company started efforts to establish a construction site, thousands of people marched in Artvin, supported by protesters and labour unions in Istanbul and İzmir, where 17 people were arrested. Thousands of people from neighbouring provinces went to Artvin to support the resistance, in 20 February 2016, 8000 people marched, despite some people being prevented from coming. In 20 February 2016, entry to and exit from the town of Artvin were banned. In protests on 21 February 2016, around 2000 protesters marched. The march was violently ended by the police using tear gas, pressurised water and plastic bullets, resulting in 26 injuries, with one person being injured heavily. Sabah, known for its close association with the government, claimed that the protests were supported by the PKK, a charge met with vitriol from the people of Artvin. On 24 February, mining activities were suspended until the end of the legal process about the mine. However, vehicles of the company did not leave the area.

=== Possible environmental damage ===
According to TMMOB, 50,300 trees would have to be felled for the mine, which covers an area of 31.8 hectares. The Chamber of Forest Engineers of Turkey has claimed that the forests in the area are invaluable and no economic benefits can justify their cutting. In response to this, the mining company has claimed that only 3500 trees would be felled and that three times as many trees will be planted once the mining is complete.

The area has a natural tendency for landslides, which occur from time to time. The MTA has written in a report that explosions required for constructing the mine will trigger landslides in the area. According to a 1996 report by the Governorship of Artvin, landslides and erosion brought by deforestation will have a significant negative impact on the town. The risk of floods in the town will be increased by deforestation. The mining company, however, has claimed that there is no danger of landslides and that "3-5 metres" of soil will be scraped from the area to be mined, thus eliminating the risk of landslides. This soil will, according to the company, be stored and later used for reforestation.

In a statement in February 2016, the company stated that the copper extracted would not be enriched with cyanide in Cerattepe but would rather be carried to some other location to be enriched. However, the enrichment facilities planned to be built in Murgul were cancelled after vigorous protests by the residents of the area. In December 2014, a TMMOB report claimed that the enrichment would probably take place in the Cerattepe area.

According to a study in Artvin Çoruh University, the sulfides in the mine bring the danger of acidic water being released from the mine.

The court canceling the licence in 2008 drew attention and validated concerns by the people of Artvin that their city would become "uninhabitable" with the construction of the mine.
