= Artvin =

City in northeastern Turkey

- Municipality
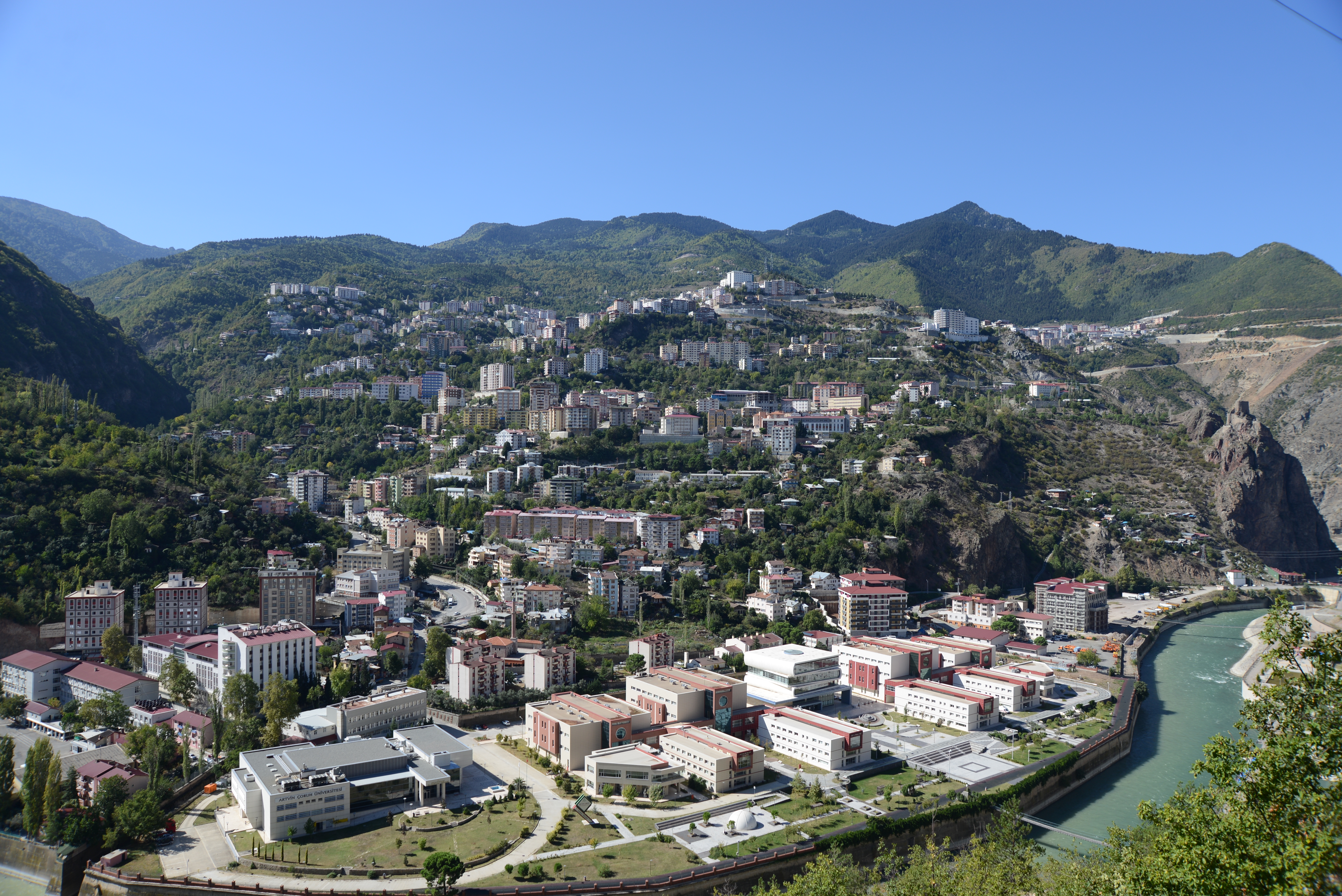
- Artvin Çoruh University City Campus

- Coat of arms

- Location within Turkey
- Coordinates: 41°11′00″N 41°49′05″E
- Country: Turkey
- Province: Artvin
- District: Artvin

Government
  - Mayor: Bilgehan Erdem (CHP)
- Elevation: 345 m (1,132 ft)
- Population (2021): 25,841
- Time zone: UTC+3 (TRT)
- Postal code: 08000
- Climate: Cfb
- Website: www.artvin.bel.tr

Artvin (Note: Laz and Georgian: ართვინი, romanized: artvini; Russian: Артвин, romanized: Artvin; Armenian: Արտուին, romanized: Artvin or Արդվին Ardvin) is a city in northeastern Turkey about 30 kilometres (19 miles) inland from the Black Sea. It is the seat of Artvin Province and Artvin District. Its population is 25,841 (2021).

It is located on a hill overlooking the Çoruh River near the Deriner Dam. It is a former bishopric and (vacant) Armenian Catholic titular see and the home of Artvin Çoruh University.

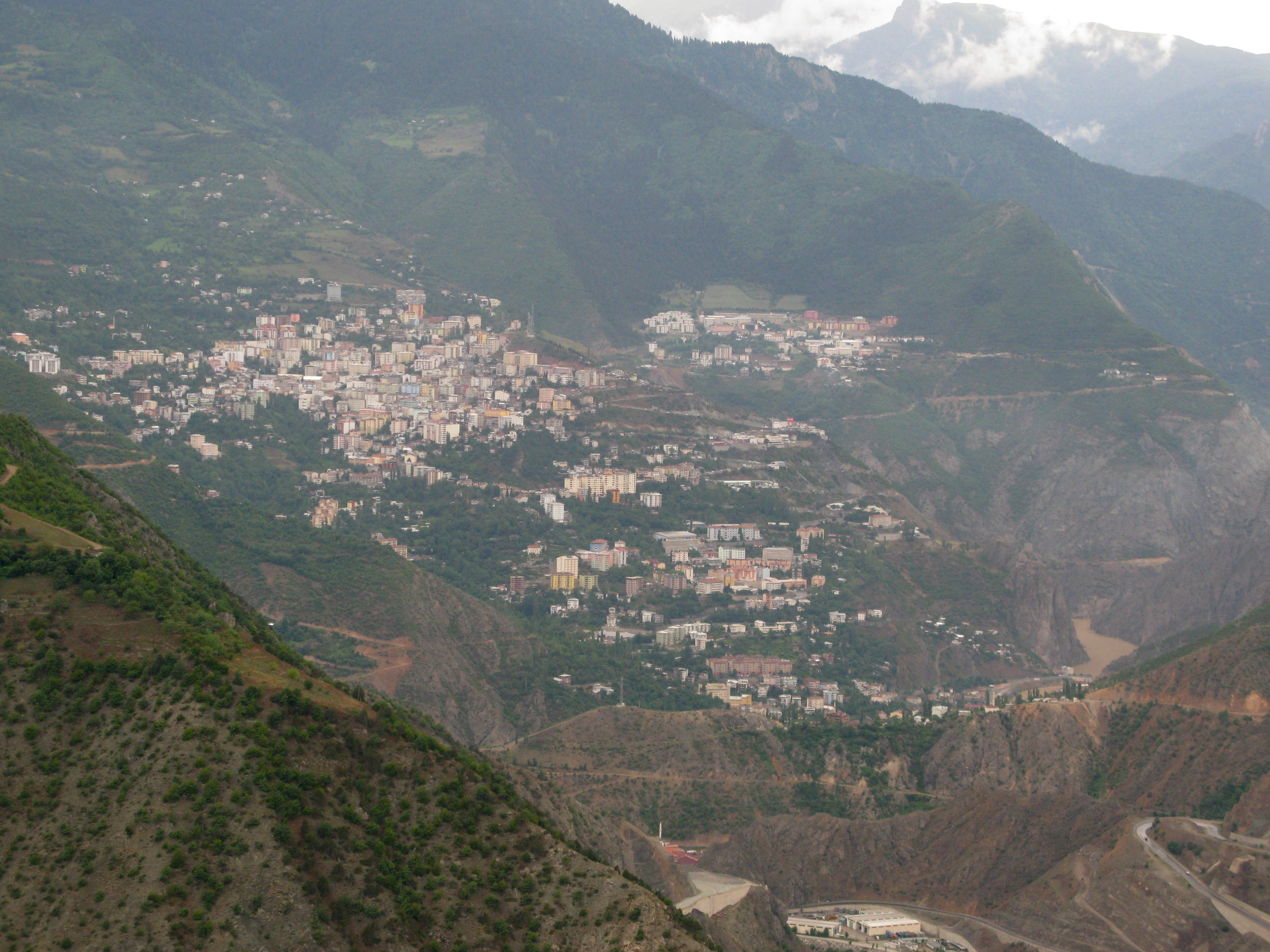
View of Artvin from Deriner Dam.

== History ==
Artifacts dating back to the Bronze Age and even earlier have been found. The area was part of the kingdom of Colchis and part of the Greater Armenia but was always vulnerable to invasions, first the Scythians from across the Caucasus, then the Muslim armies led by Habib, son of Caliph Uthman who controlled the area from 853 AD to 1023 when it was conquered by the Byzantines from the Sac Emirate linked to the Abbasids.

The Principalities of Tao-Klarjeti arose out of the turmoils of the Muslim conquests in the Caucasus in the 7th and 8th centuries, succeeding the early medieval Kingdom of Iberia and latter leading unification of Georgian Kingdom. For a long time the region became a cultural safe-house and one of the most important religious centers of Georgia.

The Seljuk Turks of Alp Arslan conquered the area in 1064 AD; but soon, it was briefly recaptured by the Georgians with the help of the Byzantines. But in 1081 Turkish forces led by Saltukoğlu Beylik managed to take it back with the aid of Malik-Shah I. With the collapse of the Seljuks, the Artvin area came under the control of the Ildeniz tribe of the Anatolian Turkish beyliks.

The Kingdom of Georgia regained control over the region through Georgian-Seljuk wars. Taking advantage of Georgia's weakness through Mongol invasions, Turkmens started incursions into south-western Georgia. The largely Georgian population of the region called on lord of Samtskhe, to assist them against the Turkmens. By the mid-13th century, the Jaqelis realm thus incorporated most of the mountainous areas of north eastern Anatolia. Various Turkmen clans continued to fight for the control of the area until the Safavids ultimately took advantage of the infighting and conquered it in 1502.

The Ottoman Empire under Mehmed II defeated the Empire of Trebizond to bring the eastern Black Sea coast and the mountainous hinterland under their control. Subsequent expeditions into the mountains by Selim I and Mehmed Han Yusufeli gave them control of a number of castles and thus the whole district. Kara Ahmed Pasha, the vizier of Suleiman I formed the first Livane Sanjak with the name Pert-Eğekte. On 13 July 1551, with Skender Pasha's Ardanuç castle, the Ottoman control of Artvin was secure. Ahmed III's vizer Hasan Pasha founded the city of Batumi in the newly acquired lands of Ajaria and it became the hub of the area.

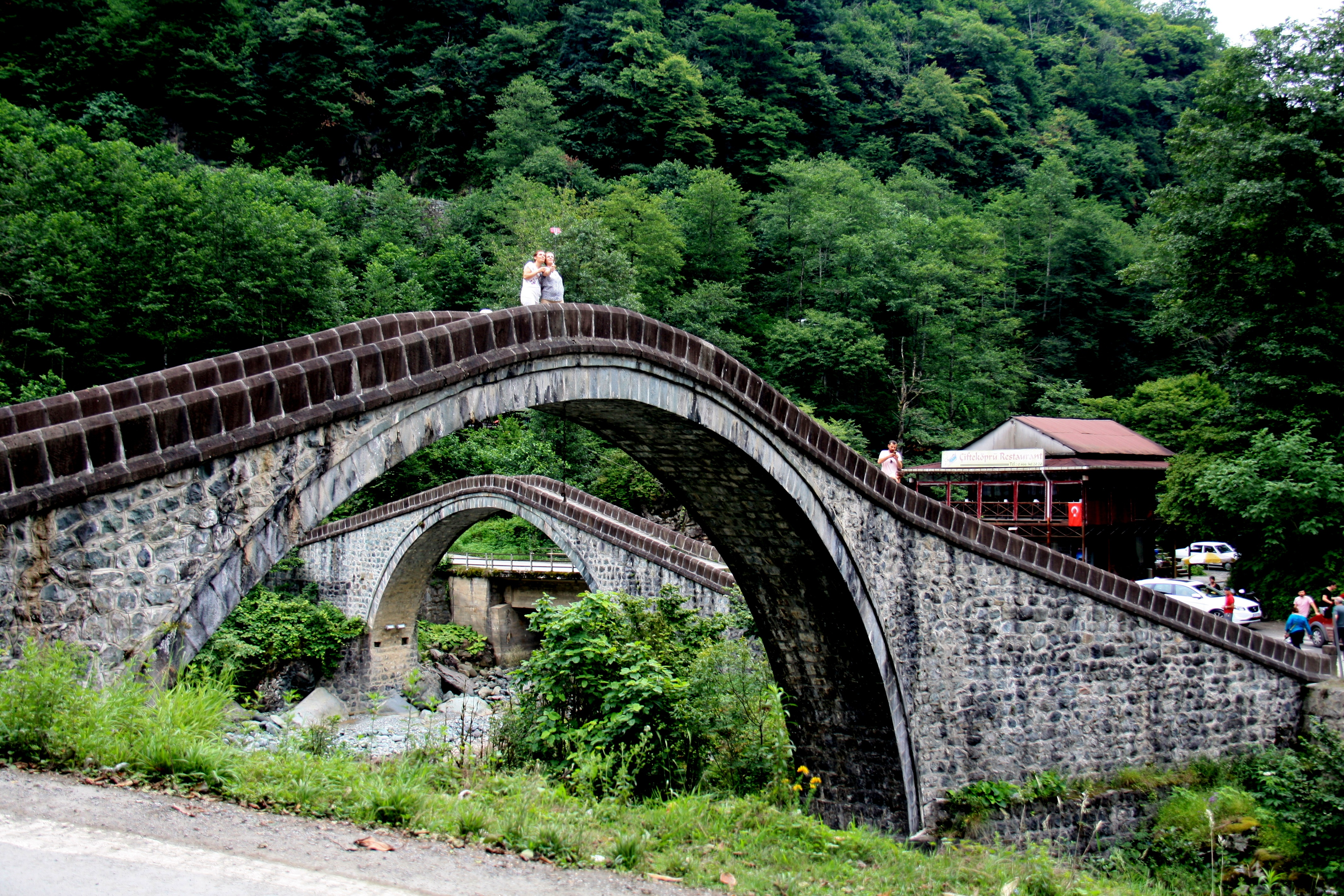
Double Bridge in Artvin Province.

This lasted 250 years until the area was ceded to the Russians by the Ottoman Empire following the Russo-Turkish War (1828–1829), and recovered and again ceded at the conclusion of the Russo-Turkish War of 1877-78. Artvin was in a war zone and continuously changing hands between Russia and Turkey with the Treaties of Brest-Litovsk, Moscow and Kars. The conflict and uncertainty between Russia and Turkey in the late 19th century brought terrible suffering to the people of Artvin (Muslim Georgians), with much of the population moving westwards away from the Russian-controlled areas. The town was the administrative center of the Artvin Okrug of the Batum Oblast.

The Russians withdrew from Artvin following the Russian Revolution of 1917; but when the First World War ended with the Ottomans on the losing side, British troops moved into the area in 1918, followed by Democratic Republic of Georgia. As a result of Red Army invasion of Georgia, Artvin was ceded to newly established Turkey under the Treaty of Kars in 1921.

Above the strategically placed town and road is the fortress, which was once within the medieval Georgian district of Nigali. The site consists of a single circuit wall surrounding the summit of the outcrop, several impressive rooms, an outwork protecting the south entrance, and a large donjon at the west. There are also embrasures and windows suitable for archers. In 1983 the fortress was surveyed and three years later an accurate scaled plan and description were published.

== Ecclesiastical history ==
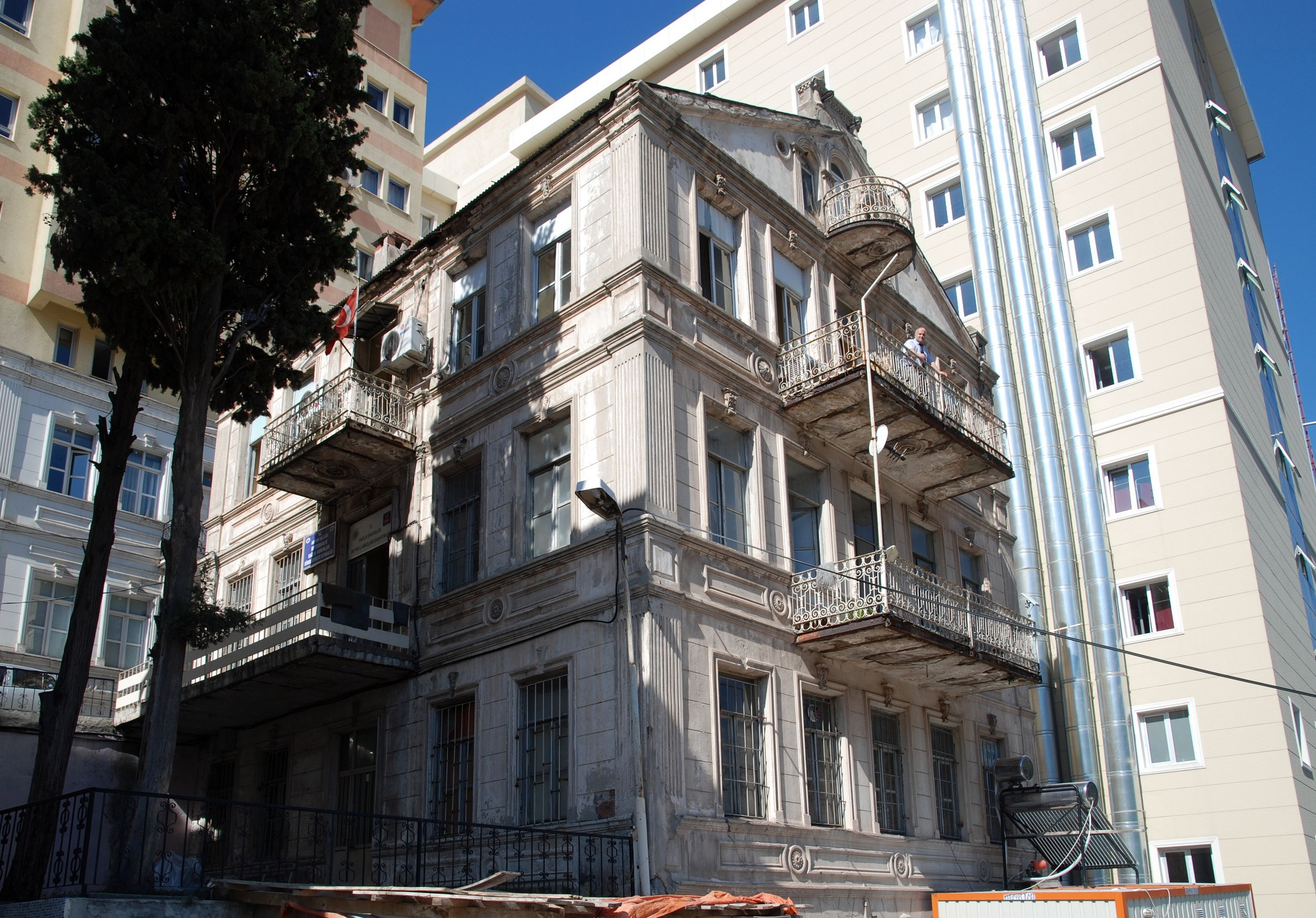
An old building in Artvin city center.

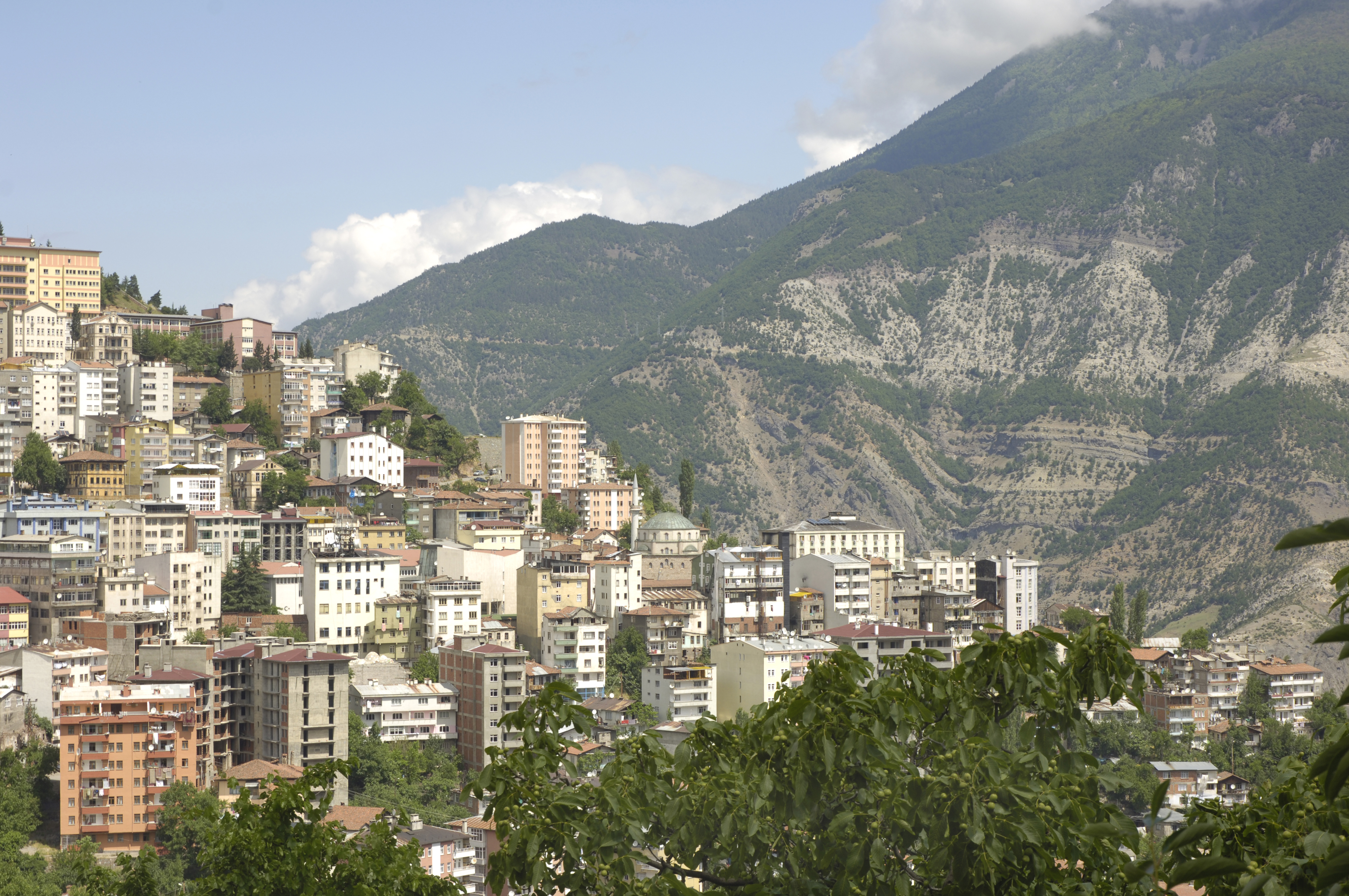
Artvin general view.

On 30 April 1850, the papal bulla Universi Dominici gregis from Pius IX established the Armenian Catholic eparchy (Eastern Catholic diocese) of Artvin of the Armenians, with jurisdiction over the extreme northeast of Turkey and in the (Russian) Transcaucasus. It has had only three incumbents:

- Timoteus Astargi (or Astorgi) (30 April 1850 - death 26 March 1851)
- Antonius Halagi (5 May 1859 - resigned 1878)
- Johannes (John) Zakarian (1 October 1878 - death 1888), who was never allowed to take possession of his see by the Czarist Russian Empire, which had taken control of the whole province of Artvin after the Russo-Turkish War (1877–1878)

In 1890 about 12,000 Armenian Catholics were reported, entrusted to the care of 13 Armenian priests in 2 churches and 5 chapels.

Under an agreement between Russia and the Holy See in 1904, Catholic Armenians throughout the Caucasus and interior Russia were entrusted to an apostolic administrator resident in Tbilisi (Georgia), but the Soviet authorities imprisoned him, and he died some time before 1937. The diocese had already lost most of its faithful in the Armenian genocide at the end of the First World War.

The Holy See continued to list the eparchy of Artvin as a vacant residential see until 1971, but in 1972, suppressing it as such, began to list Artvin as the Armenian Catholic titular bishopric of Artvin (Curiate Italian) / Artwin / Artuinen(sis) Armenorum (Latin).

However it never has had a titular incumbent, who should be of the fitting Episcopal (lowest) rank.

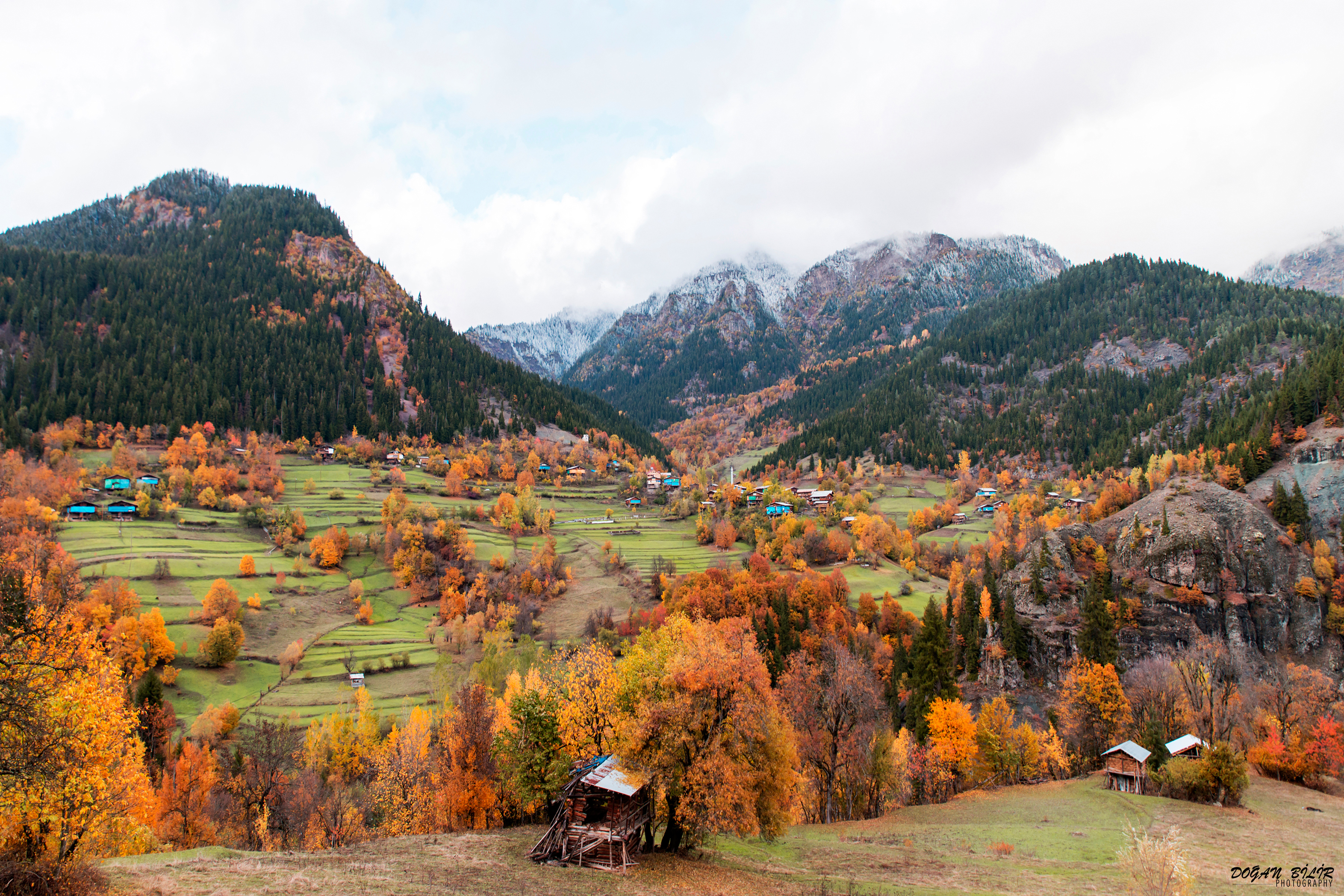
Çağliyan, a village in Şavşat.

== Demographics ==
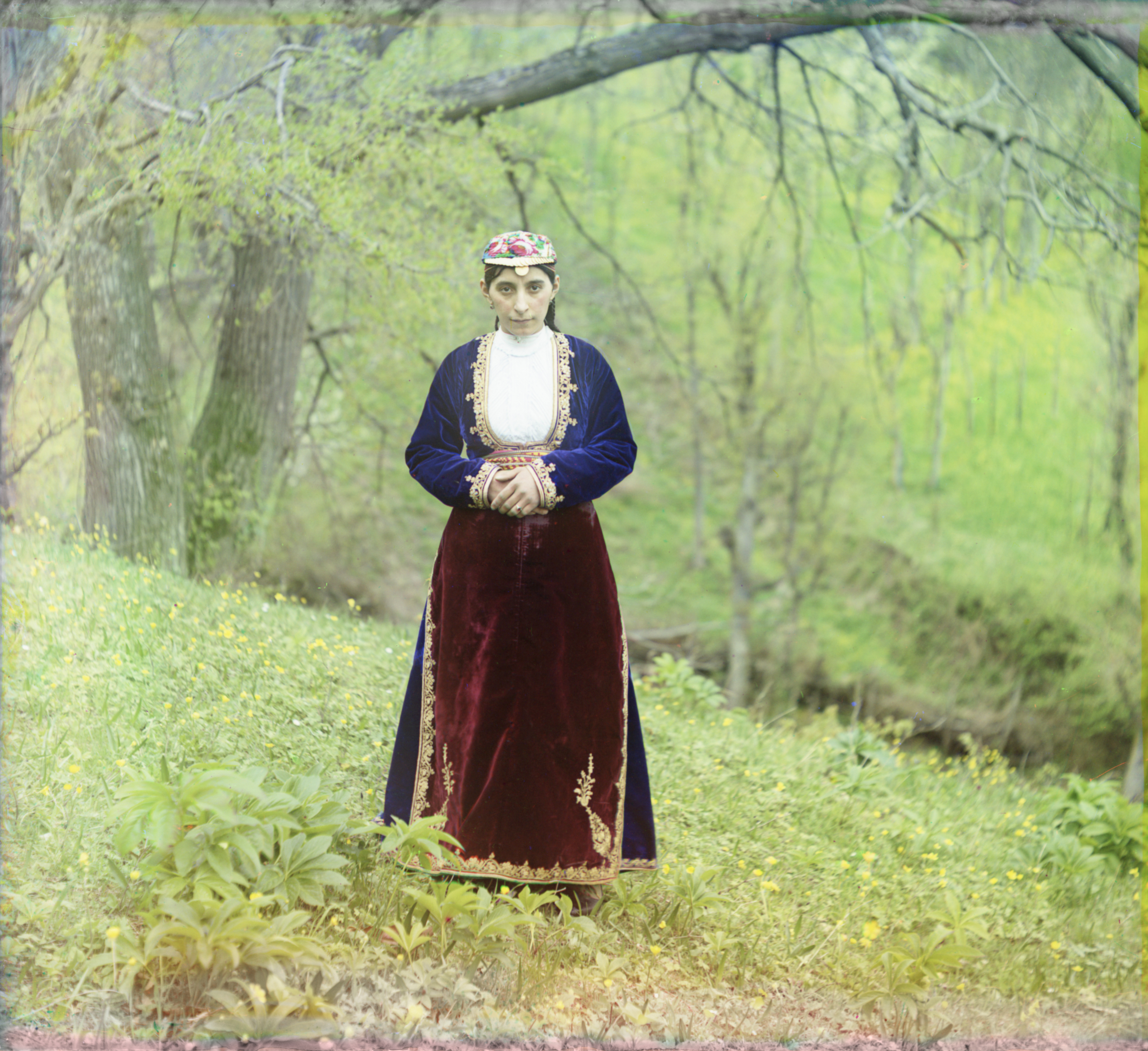
An Armenian woman in national costume poses on a hillside near Artvin, circa 1910.

In the census of 1897, the town of Artvin was mainly populated by Armenians, part of whom came from the Mush and Van region. However, the district in which the town was located was largely Muslim. Outside of the town, the population in the district numbered 49,049 people, of whom 39,997 (82%) were Turks, 5,458 (11%) Georgian and 3,173 (6%) Armenian.

Year	Total	Ethnic groups
1886	6,442	Armenians (76.4%), Turks (23.4%)
1897	7,091	Armenians (65.5%), Turks (21.0%), East Slavs (11.9%), Georgians (0.9%)
1907	7,345	Predominantly Armenians and Turks
1916	6,997	Armenians (77.9%), Georgians (12.6%), North Caucasians (4.3%), Russians (3.1%), Shia Muslims (2.0%)
1985	18,720	Turks, Laz, Georgian
1990	20,306	Turks, Laz, Georgian
2000	23,157	Turks, Laz, Georgian
2016	26,329	Turks, Laz, Georgian

== Places of interest ==
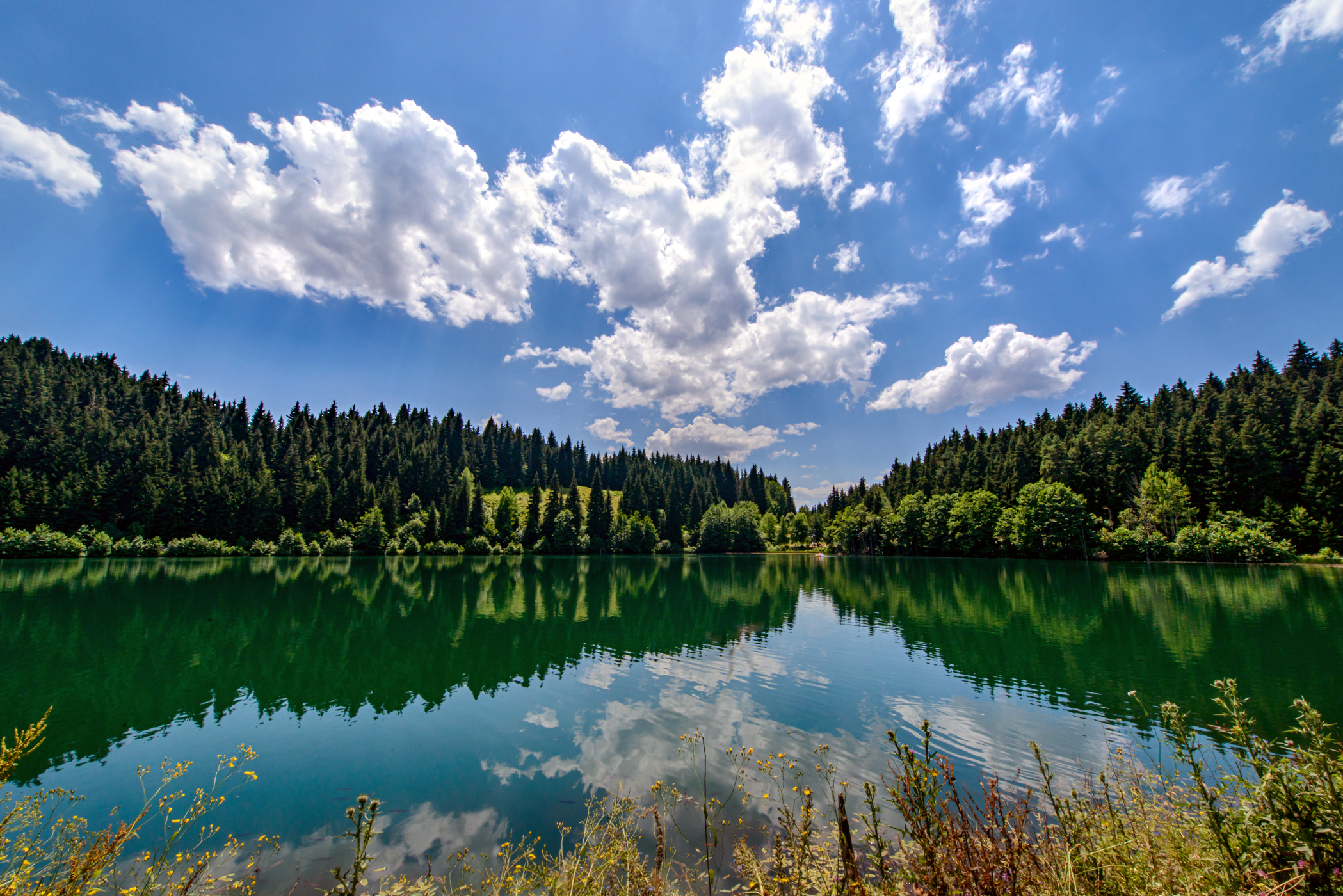
Karagöl-Sahara National Park

- Artvin or Livana (Livane) castle, built in 937

There are a number of Ottoman Empire houses and public buildings, including :

- Salih Bey mosque, built in 1792
- Çarsi mosque, built in the 18th century
- Balcioglu mosque, built in the 18th century
- The fountain of Çelebi Efendi, built in 1783.

The surrounding countryside offers many places for climbing, trekking and rafting, including:

- Karagöl-Sahara National Park.
- The Camili (Macahel) UNESCO Biosphere Reserve, the first and only UNESCO Biosphere Reserve in Türkiye.

== Events ==
Artvin is known for the Caucasus (Kafkas in Turkish) Culture and Arts Festival, a celebration that takes place at the Kafkasör plateau every year. The most famous event is the bull wrestling which draws many local and international visitors.

== Climate ==
Artvin has an Oceanic climate (Cfb) under the Köppen classification. It also has a warm summer oceanic climate (Dob) according to the Trewartha classification system.

Highest recorded temperature:43.0 °C (109.4 °F) on 18 August 1961
Lowest recorded temperature:−16.1 °C (3.0 °F) on 14 January 1950

Climate data for Artvin (normals 1991–2020, extremes 1949–2023)
Month	Jan	Feb	Mar	Apr	May	Jun	Jul	Aug	Sep	Oct	Nov	Dec	Year
Record high °C (°F)	18.9 (66.0)	21.5 (70.7)	28.4 (83.1)	34.4 (93.9)	36.7 (98.1)	39.0 (102.2)	42.0 (107.6)	43.0 (109.4)	41.5 (106.7)	33.9 (93.0)	27.9 (82.2)	20.9 (69.6)	43.0 (109.4)
Mean daily maximum °C (°F)	6.4 (43.5)	8.5 (47.3)	12.6 (54.7)	17.7 (63.9)	21.8 (71.2)	24.4 (75.9)	26.2 (79.2)	26.8 (80.2)	24.4 (75.9)	20.0 (68.0)	13.1 (55.6)	7.9 (46.2)	17.5 (63.5)
Daily mean °C (°F)	2.8 (37.0)	3.9 (39.0)	7.2 (45.0)	11.7 (53.1)	15.9 (60.6)	19.1 (66.4)	21.3 (70.3)	21.7 (71.1)	18.7 (65.7)	14.6 (58.3)	8.7 (47.7)	4.4 (39.9)	12.5 (54.5)
Mean daily minimum °C (°F)	0.1 (32.2)	0.7 (33.3)	3.2 (37.8)	7.1 (44.8)	11.4 (52.5)	14.8 (58.6)	17.4 (63.3)	18.0 (64.4)	14.8 (58.6)	11.0 (51.8)	5.6 (42.1)	1.8 (35.2)	8.8 (47.8)
Record low °C (°F)	−16.1 (3.0)	−11.9 (10.6)	−9.8 (14.4)	−7.1 (19.2)	−0.6 (30.9)	3.7 (38.7)	9.5 (49.1)	9.5 (49.1)	4.2 (39.6)	−1.6 (29.1)	−8.2 (17.2)	−10.8 (12.6)	−16.1 (3.0)
Average rainfall mm (inches)	85.0 (3.35)	71.7 (2.82)	63.8 (2.51)	52.2 (2.06)	57.3 (2.26)	51.5 (2.03)	36.9 (1.45)	33.1 (1.30)	40.9 (1.61)	67.0 (2.64)	81.4 (3.20)	83.8 (3.30)	724.6 (28.53)
Average precipitation days (≥ 0.1 mm)	13.1	13.4	13.87	13.63	14.57	12.83	9.13	9.17	9.13	10.83	10.9	11.67	142.23
Average snowy days	6.27	5.33	5.47	0.47	0	0	0	0	0	0	1.2	3.67	22.41
Average relative humidity (%)	62.7	60.7	58.9	58.0	61.5	64.9	67.2	68.2	65.4	64.0	62.2	63.5	63.1
Mean monthly sunshine hours	74.4	96.1	133.3	150.0	198.4	213.0	210.8	207.7	192.0	148.8	96.0	65.1	1,785.6
Mean daily sunshine hours	2.4	3.4	4.3	5	6.4	7.1	6.8	6.7	6.4	4.8	3.2	2.1	4.9
Source 1: Turkish State Meteorological Service
Source 2: NOAA(precipitation days - humidity), Meteomanz(snowy days 2009-2023)

== Twin cities ==
- (Georgia (country)) Akhaltsikhe, Georgia
- Oslo, Norway
- (Georgia (country)) Batumi, Georgia
- Frankfurt, Germany
- Casablanca, Morocco

== See also ==
- Arifana
- Cerattepe
- Lazistan

== Sources and external links ==
- Governor's Office
- the Municipality
- GCatholic - former & titular see
- Joseph Lins, "Artvin" in The Catholic Encyclopedia lemma 'Artvin' in Catholic Encyclopedia (New York 1907)
- Artvin Village (in Turkish)
- Photographic survey and plan of Artvin Castle
- local information (in Turkish)
- Artvin Weather Forecast Information
- Artvin Otelleri
- Karadeniz Ansiklopedik Sözlük.İstanbul. 2005. ISBN 975-6121-00-9.

Bibliography - ecclesiastical

- Pius Bonifacius Gams, Series episcoporum Ecclesiae Catholicae, Leipzig 1931, p. 456 & Series episcoporum Ecclesiae Catholicae, Complementi, Leipzig 1931, p. 93
- Notizie storiche sull'eparchia di Artvin, katolsk.no.
- Papal Bulla 'Universi Dominici gregis', in Giovanni Domenico Mansi, Sacrorum Conciliorum Nova et Amplissima Collectio, vol. XL, coll. 779-780
