= Hatila Valley National Park =

National park in Artvin, Turkey

- Hatila Vadisi Millî Parkı
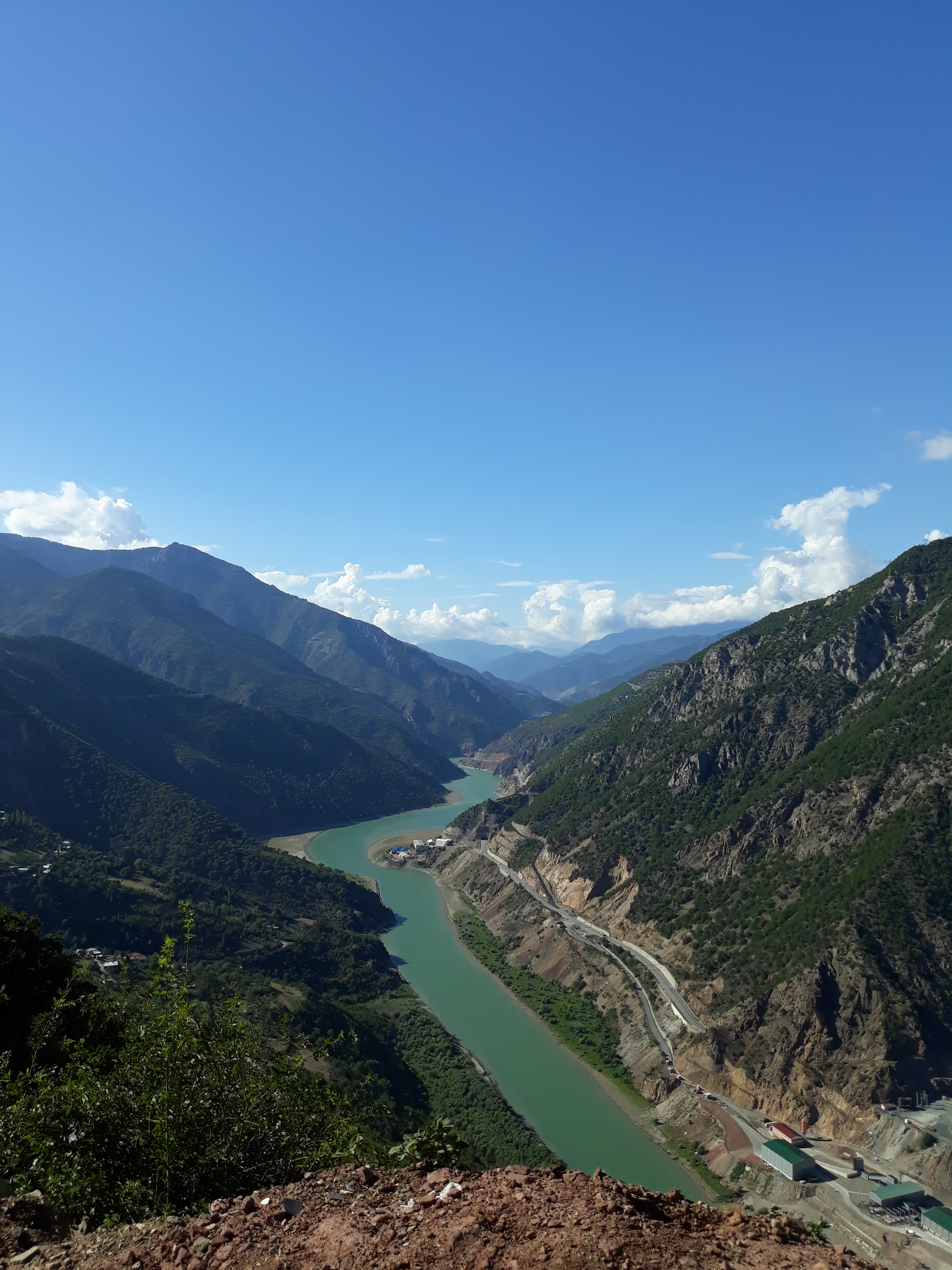

- Location within Turkey
- Location: Artvin Province, Turkey
- Nearest city: Artvin, Turkey
- Coordinates: 41°11′09″N 41°44′02″E
- Area: 16,900 ha (42,000 acres)
- Established: August 31, 1994
- Governing body: Ministry of Forest and Water Management

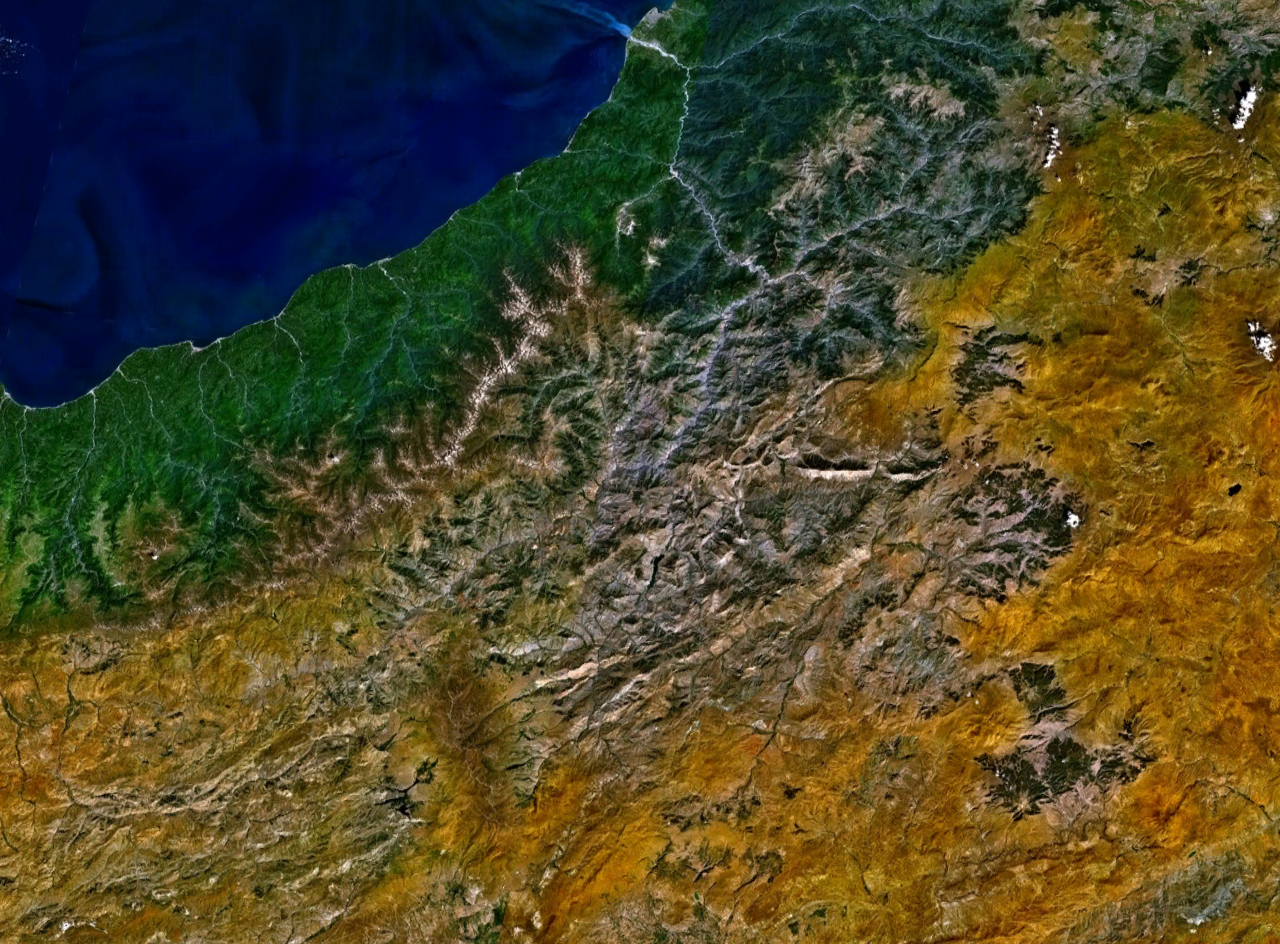
The Kaçkar Mountains

Hatila Valley National Park (Turkish: Hatila Vadisi Millî Parkı) is a national park in Artvin Province in northeastern Turkey. It consists of a steep-sided river valley at the eastern end of the Kaçkar Mountains. The area is close to the Black Sea and has a Mediterranean climate with warm summers, cool winters and plentiful rainfall throughout the year. The valley provides habitats for a diverse community of plants and animals.

== Park ==
The Hatila River is a tributary of the Çoruh River and has carved out a narrow, steep-sided, V-shaped valley with many waterfalls. The rock is mostly of volcanic origin and has an unusual geomorphologic structure and geology, which has created a distinctive landscape. The park occupies an area of about 16,900 hectares (42,000 acres). The lower parts of the valley are dry and warm but the higher parts are cool and humid with snow cover in winter. The valley is densely vegetated, especially in its middle and lower sections. Between 1994 and 1997, a botanical survey carried out identified 769 species of plant in 87 families and 324 genera here.

== Flora ==
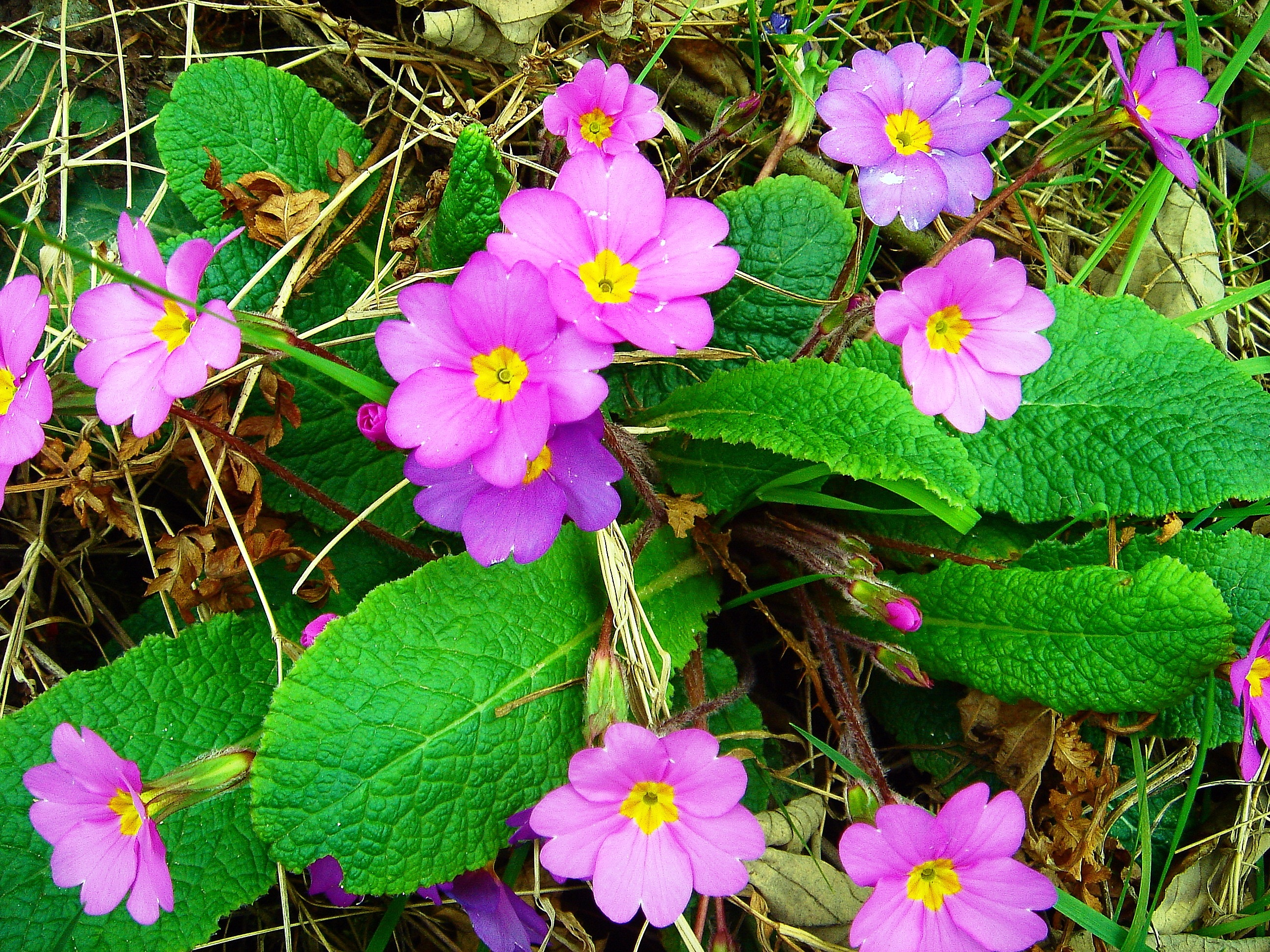
Primula vulgaris subsp. sibthorpii

The forests on the mountain slopes in the park consist of both deciduous and evergreen tree species. These include sessile oak, sweet chestnut, oriental hornbeam, common hornbeam, black alder, oriental beech, oriental spruce, Caucasian fir and Scots pine. On the higher slopes, the common aspen is added to these as well as rhododendron, juniper, Vaccinium, willow, birch and European raspberry.

The Hatila Valley has a very rich flora and a long botanical season, with different flowering periods for different zones depending on altitude. In spring in the lower parts of the valley, forest clearings are abloom with hellebores, magenta Cyclamen coum, blue Cappadocian navelwort and pink Primula vulgaris subsp. sibthorpii. Higher up the valley, and a few weeks later, Primula vulgaris flowers profusely and at least five species of snowdrop grow here including the recently described Galanthus koenenianus. The hay meadows and forest glades at higher elevations are at their best around midsummer. Here bloom several species of cranesbill, including the Armenian cranesbill, globe flower, lousewort and a variety of terrestrial orchids. Higher still, the forest gives way to scrubland with buckthorn, birch and rhododendron including the yellow-flowered Rhododendron luteum. Here there grow yellow lilies, Wittmann's paeony and the blue and white-flowered Aquilegia olympica. Higher still there is moorland and alpine pastures with many species of bulbous plants including stars of Bethlehem, Scilla siberica and Scilla rosenii. Among the short grasses grow primulas, including Primula auricula in damp spots, gentians, mountain pansies, bellflowers and betony. In the autumn there are several varieties of crocus, and also colchicum.

== Fauna ==
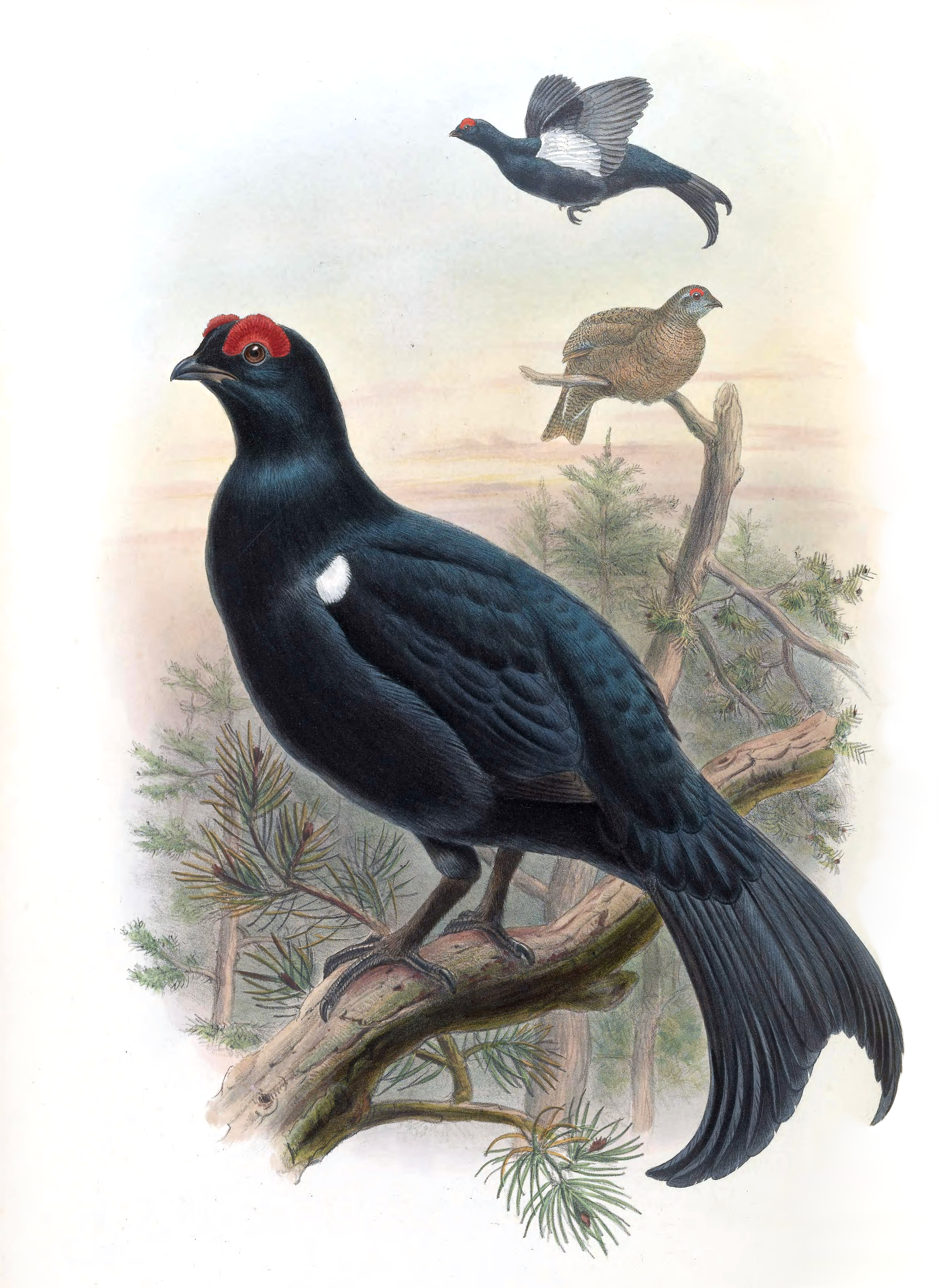
Caucasian grouse

The natural forest of Hatila Valley National Park and the surrounding area is rich in wildlife. Large mammals found here include grey wolf, red fox, lynx, leopard, brown bear, wild goat, chamois, roe deer, wild boar and European hare. Many birds of prey pass through during their migrations, and golden eagle, long-legged buzzard, peregrine falcon, Caspian snowcock, Caucasian grouse, chukar partridge and grey partridge can be seen here.

== Facilities ==
The park is approached by a 10 km (6 mi) road from Artvin. Accommodation is available in bungalows, caravans or tents.
