= Governor of Artvin =

Governor of a Turkish Province

Governor of Artvin Artvin Valiliği
- Logo of the Governor of Artvin
- Incumbent; Turan Ergün since September 26, 2024
- Appointer: President of Turkey On the recommendation of the Turkish government
- Term length: No set term length or limit
- Inaugural holder: Mesut Bey; 1924
- Website: Office of the Governor

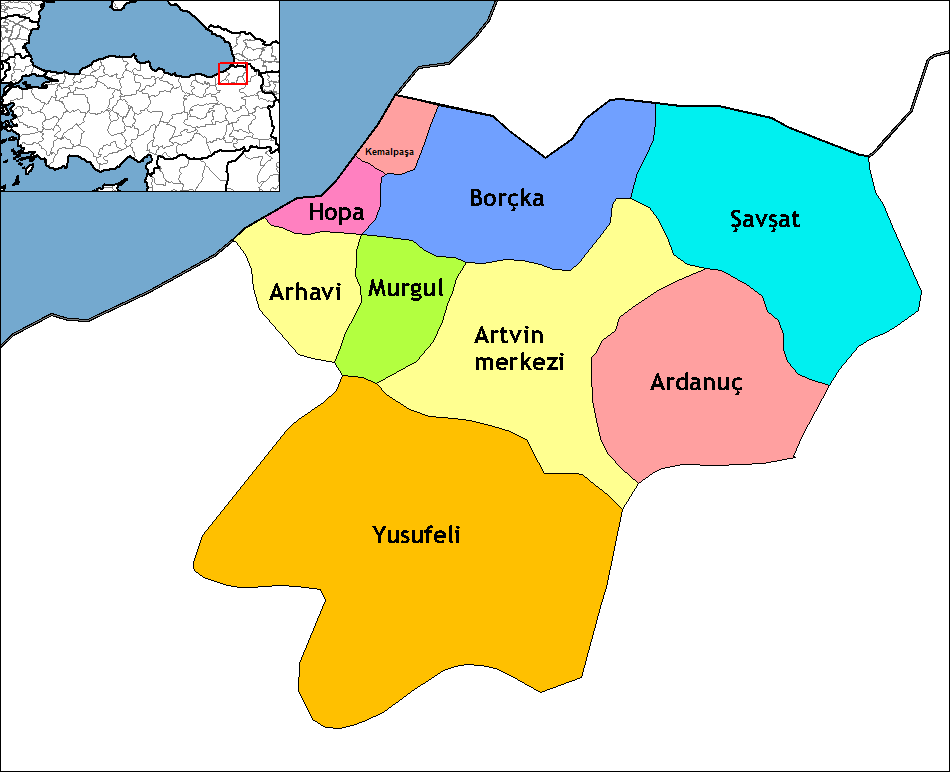
Map of the Province of Artvin, showing the provincial districts.

The Governor of Artvin (Turkish: Artvin Valiliği) is the bureaucratic state official responsible for both national government and state affairs in the Province of Artvin. Similar to the Governors of the 80 other Provinces of Turkey, the Governor of Artvin is appointed by the Government of Turkey and is responsible for the implementation of government legislation within Artvin. The Governor is also the most senior commander of both the Artvin provincial police force and the Artvin Gendarmerie.

== Appointment ==
The Governor of Artvin is appointed by the President of Turkey, who confirms the appointment after recommendation from the Turkish Government. The Ministry of the Interior first considers and puts forward possible candidates for approval by the cabinet. The Governor of Artvin is therefore not a directly elected position and instead functions as the most senior civil servant in the Province of Artvin.

=== Term limits ===
The Governor is not limited by any term limits and does not serve for a set length of time. Instead, the Governor serves at the pleasure of the Government, which can appoint or reposition the Governor whenever it sees fit. Such decisions are again made by the cabinet of Turkey. The Governor of Artvin, as a civil servant, may not have any close connections or prior experience in Artvin Province. It is not unusual for Governors to alternate between several different Provinces during their bureaucratic career.

== Functions ==
The Governor of Artvin has both bureaucratic functions and influence over local government. The main role of the Governor is to oversee the implementation of decisions by government ministries, constitutional requirements and legislation passed by Grand National Assembly within the provincial borders. The Governor also has the power to reassign, remove or appoint officials a certain number of public offices and has the right to alter the role of certain public institutions if they see fit. Governors are also the most senior public official within the Province, meaning that they preside over any public ceremonies or provincial celebrations being held due to a national holiday. As the commander of the provincial police and Gendarmerie forces, the Governor can also take decisions designed to limit civil disobedience and preserve public order. Although mayors of municipalities and councillors are elected during local elections, the Governor has the right to re-organise or to inspect the proceedings of local government despite being an unelected position.

== List of governors of Artvin ==
- Mehmet Rahmi Eyüboğlu (1922)
- Mesut Bey (1924–1925)
- Salim Özdemir Günday (1925–1927)
- Hazım İbrahim Mat (1927–1929)
- Ahmet Cevdet Ertuğrul (1929–1931)
- İmadettin Arda (1931–1933)
- Ömer Bedrettin Uşaklı (1933–1936)
- Hüsnü Arı (1936)
- Refik Koraltan (1936–1938)
- Kadri Üçok (1938–1940)
- Selahattin Üner (1941–1942)
- Cavit Kınay (1942–1944)
- Cenap Aksu (1944–1945)
- Cemal Babaç (1945)
- Abdullah Zeki Köymen (1945–1948)
- Hilmi İnanç (1948)
- İsmail Hamit Oktay (1948–1949)
- Cemal Babaç (1949–1950)
- Mümtaz Nayman (1950–1951)
- Hayri Orhon (1951–1952)
- Mazlum Yegül (1952–1954)
- Hilmi İnanç (1954–1956)
- Hilmi Tolun (1956–1960)
- Bekir Silahçılar (1960)
- Ziya Kasnakoğlu (1960–1962)
- M.Hamdi Ergün (1962–1965)
- Faruk Cemal Vefkioğlu (1965–1966)
- Babür Ünsal (1966–1970)
- Celal Turgut Güvenç (1970–1975)
- İhsan Dede (1975–1978)
- Sami Sönmez (1978–1979)
- Hüsnü Tuğlu (1979–1981)
- H.Ayhan Ergin (1981–1984)
- Alpaslan Karacan (1984–1985)
- Emrullah Zeybek (1985–1989)
- Aslan Yıldırım (1989–1991)
- Selahattin Onur (1991–1997)
- Ömer Büyükkent (1997–1999)
- Selahattin Akyurt (1999–2003)
- Orhan Kırlı (2003–2006)
- Cengiz Aydoğdu (2006–2009)
- Mustafa Yemlihalıoğlu (2009–2011)
- Necmettin Kalkan (2011–2013)
- Kemal Cirit (2013–2023)
- Cengiz Ünsal (2023–2024)
- Turan Ergün (2024–)

== See also ==
- Governor (Turkey)
- Artvin Province
- Ministry of the Interior (Turkey)
