= Double Bridge =

Çifte Bridge Çifteköprü
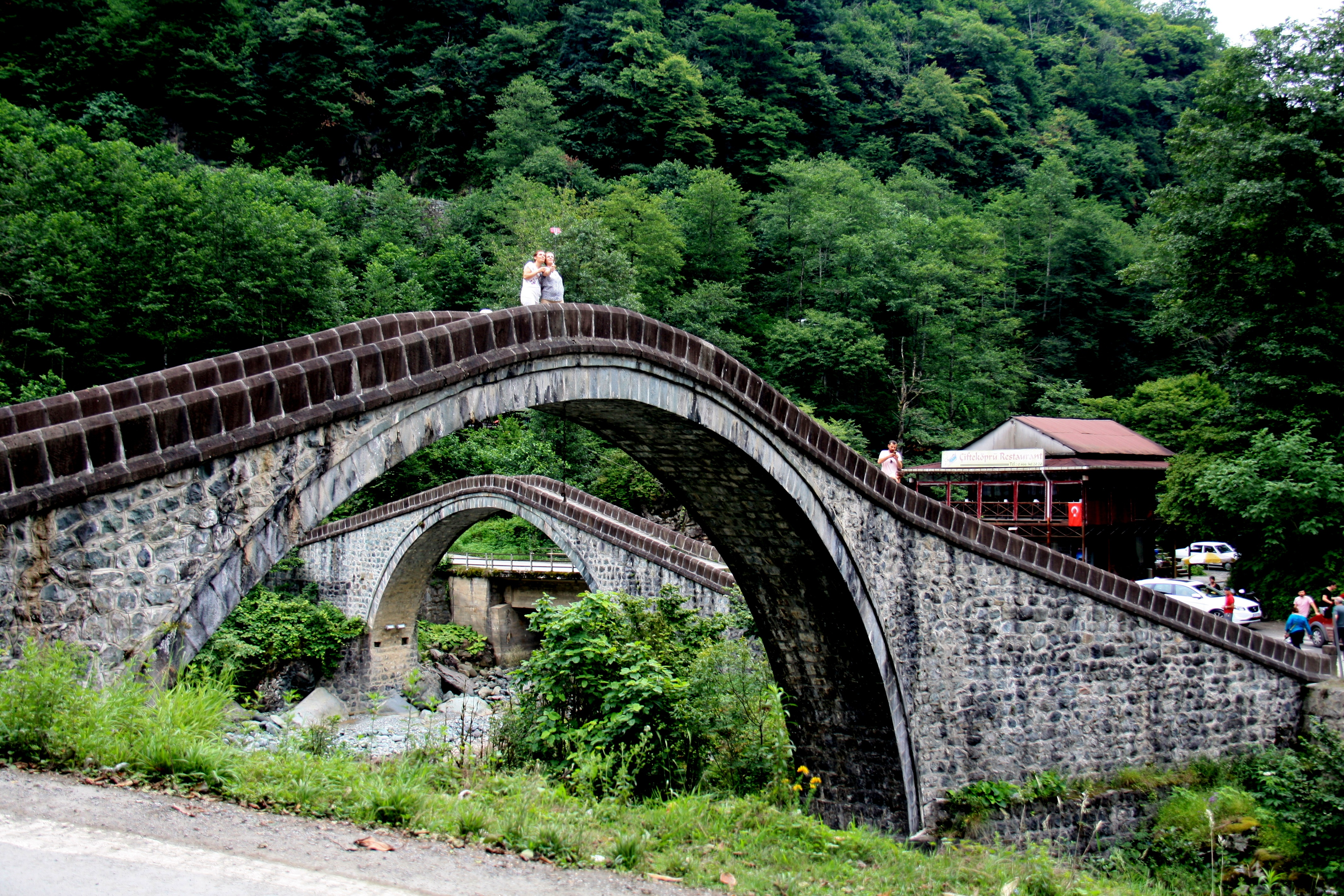
- Çifteköprü (Double Bridge) in Arhavi, Artvin Province, Turkey
- Coordinates: 41.2764°N 41.3760°E
- Crosses: Kamilat, Soğucak creeks
- Locale: Arhavi, Artvin Province
- Named for: The twin character of the bridges
- Owner: General Directorate of Highways

Characteristics
- Total length: 35.5 m (116 ft) each
- Width: 2.80 m (9 ft 2 in) each

History
- Construction end: 18th century (?)

Çifte Bridge (Turkish: Çifte Köprü, literally "Double Bridge") is the name for two small adjacent historic bridges in Artvin Province, northeastern Turkey.

The bridges are in Arhavi ilçe (district) at 41°16′35″N 41°22′32″E. They span two small rivers, the Kamilat and Soğucak, just above their confluence. The bridges do not bear any inscription indicating when they were constructed. Scholars have estimated that they were built during the 18th century, during the Ottoman Empire. The traveler's periodical Atlas gives their construction date as 19th century.

The bridges are located perpendicular to each other. Both are identical single-arch moon bridges of length 35.50 m (116.5 ft) and width 2.80 m (9 ft 2 in). They underwent restoration in 2002. Due to their architectural structure and limited width, the bridges are in use for pedestrians only. Modern road bridges have been built slightly upstream to carry vehicle traffic.
