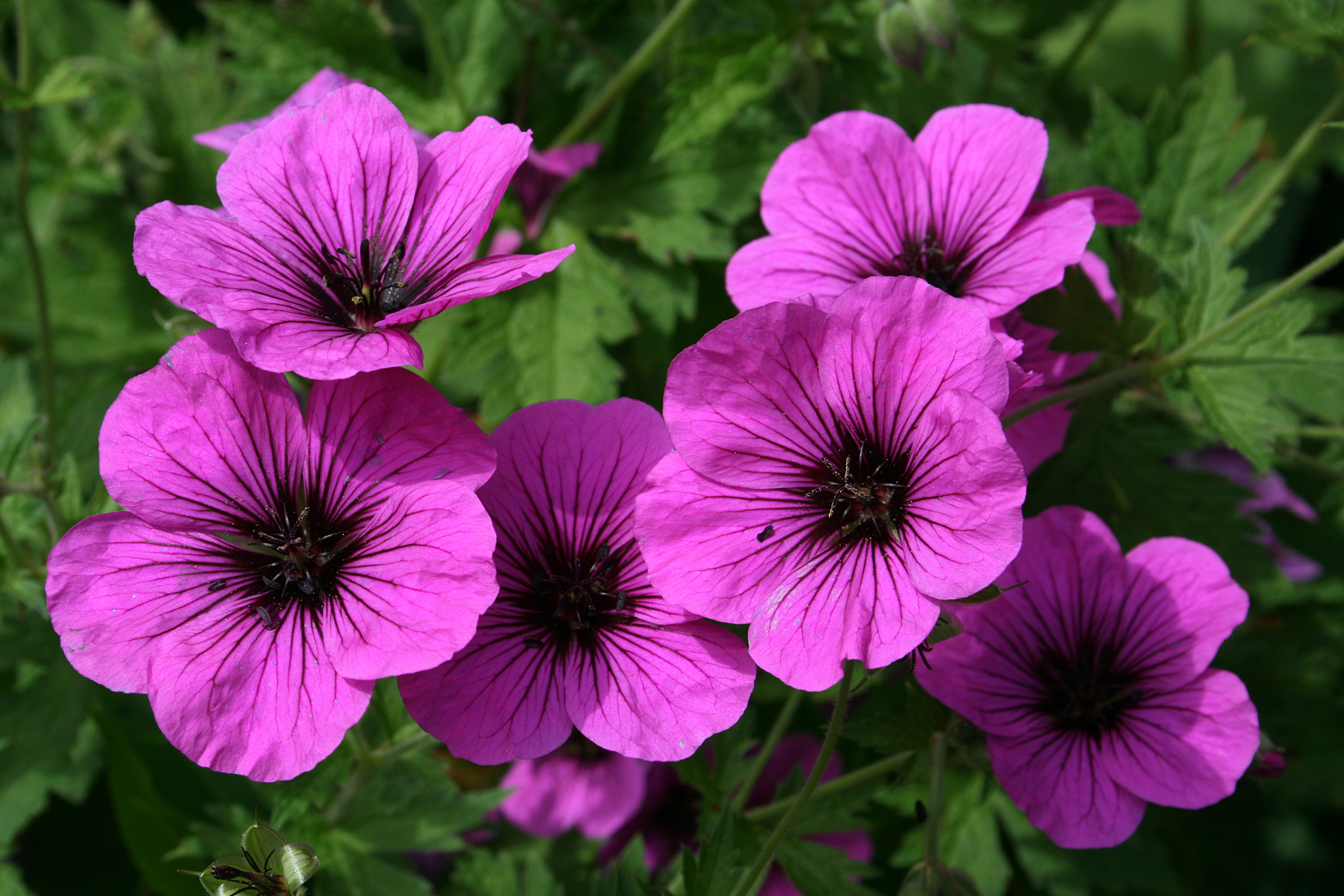
- The cultivar 'Bressingham Flair'

Scientific classification
- Kingdom: Plantae
- Clade: Tracheophytes
- Clade: Angiosperms
- Clade: Eudicots
- Clade: Rosids
- Order: Geraniales
- Family: Geraniaceae
- Genus: Geranium
- Species: G. psilostemon

Binomial name
- Geranium psilostemon Ledeb.

Synonyms
- Geranium armenum Boiss

= Geranium psilostemon =

Species of flowering plant

Geranium psilostemon, commonly called Armenian cranesbill, is a species of hardy flowering herbaceous perennial plant in the genus Geranium, family Geraniaceae. It is native to Turkey, Armenia, Azerbaijan, and the Russian Federation. Forming a large clump to 120 cm (47 in) tall, it has glowing reddish purple colored flowers with prominent dark centres, and divided leaves tinted red in Autumn. It is cultivated as a garden subject, and a number of different cultivars exist. G. psilostemon has the UK’s hardiest rating, surviving temperatures as low as −20 °C (−4 °F).

The Latin specific epithet psilostemon means "with smooth stamens".

Like other geranium species, G. psilostemon is useful as underplanting for larger shrubs such as roses. It has earned the Royal Horticultural Society's Award of Garden Merit. The cultivar 'Ivan' has also received the award.
