= Karagöl-Sahara National Park =

National park in Artvin, Turkey

- Karagöl-Sahara Milli Parkı
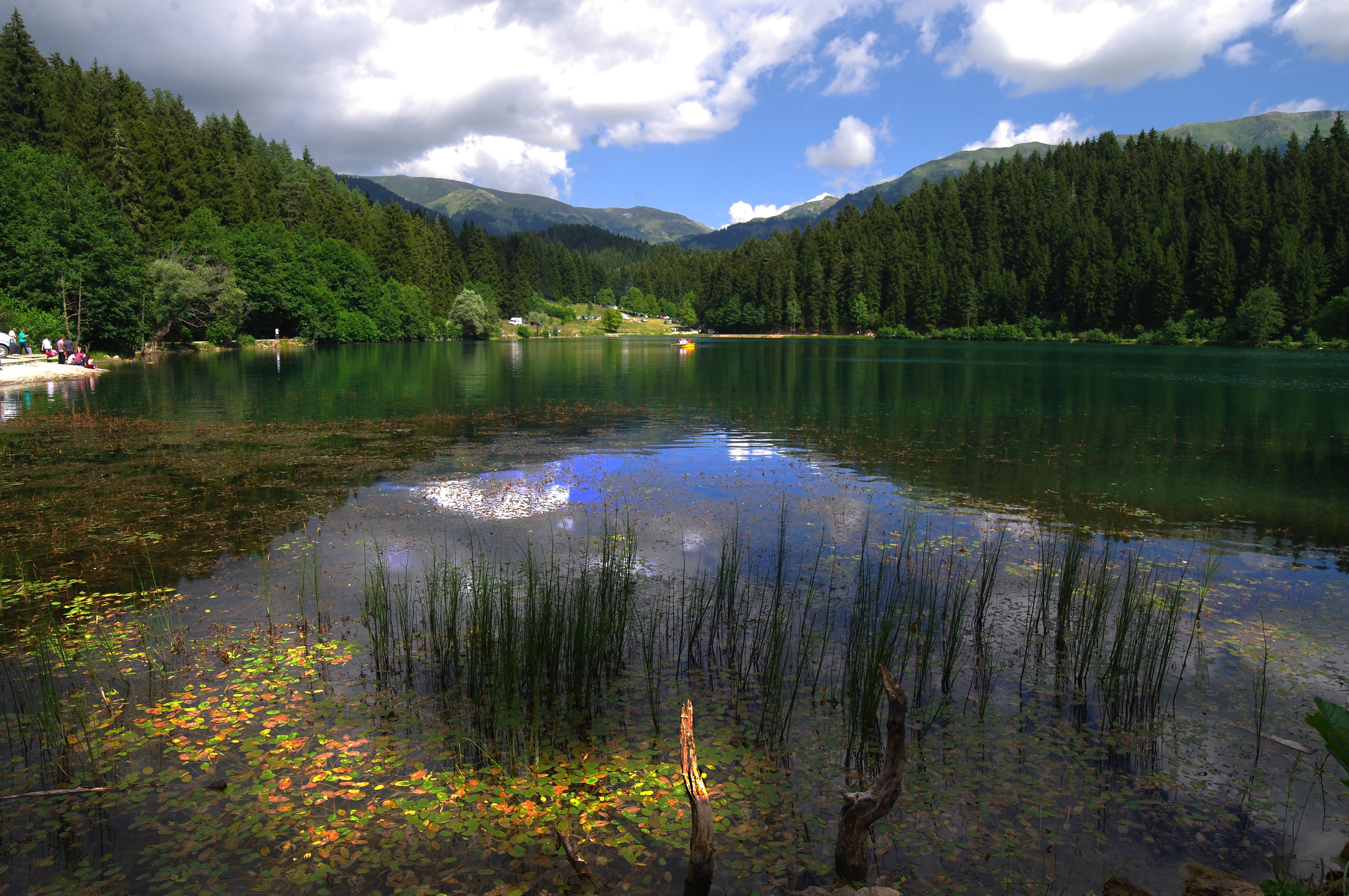

- Location within Turkey
- Location: Şavşat, Artvin Province, Turkey
- Coordinates: 41°13′N 42°27′E
- Area: 3,251 ha (8,030 acres)
- Established: August 31, 1994
- Governing body: Ministry of Forest and Water Management
- Website: www.milliparklar.gov.tr/mp/karagolsahara/index.htm

Karagöl-Sahara National Park (Turkish: Karagöl-Sahara Milli Parkı), established on August 31, 1994, is a national park in the Şavşat district of Artvin Province, Turkey. It is located in the Black Sea Region and formed by two separate areas, namely Karagöl and Sahara plateau. Karagöl is located at 45 km (28 mi) from Şavşat, while Sahara plateau is 17 km (11 mi) from the town.

The national park covers an area of 3,251 ha (8,030 acres) at an average elevation of 1,800 m (5,900 ft) above mean sea level.
