= Artvin Çoruh University =

Public university in Artvin, Turkey

Coordinates: 41.1832°N 41.8325°E

- Established: 2007
- Location: Artvin, Turkey
- Website: Official website

Artvin Çoruh University (Turkish: Artvin Çoruh Üniversitesi) is a university located in Artvin, Turkey. It was established in 2007.

Artvin Çoruh University (AÇÜ) is one of the new universities approved by Ahmet Necdet Sezer on May 29, 2007, after being separated from KTÜ, which was established with the Law No. 5662, “Law on the Amendment of the Law on the Organization of Higher Education Institutions and the Decree Law on the Staffing of Higher Education Institutions and the Rulers Attached to the Decree Law on General Staff and Procedure”. It is located in Artvin province. The decision on the establishment of the university was published in the Official Gazette No. 26536.

== History ==
Law No. 5662 dated May 17, 2007 established Artvin Çoruh University and this law entered into force after being published in the Official Gazette No. 26736 dated May 29, 2007. Article 7 of Law No. 5662 on the establishment of Artvin Çoruh University reads as follows

“Artvin Çoruh University”

ADDITIONAL ARTICLE 80- A university was established in Artvin with the name Artvin Çoruh University. This University

- The Faculty of Arts and Sciences established under the Rectorate, the Faculty of Education, which was affiliated to the Rectorate by changing its name and affiliation while it was affiliated to the Rectorate of Karadeniz Technical University, and the Faculty of Forestry, which was affiliated to the Rectorate by changing its name and affiliation while it was affiliated to Kafkas University,
- The School of Health, which was affiliated to the Rectorate of Kafkas University, was created by changing its name and connection and connected to the Rectorate,
- Vocational School, which was affiliated to the Rectorate of Kafkas University but was created by changing its name and connection and connected to the Rectorate, Arhavi Vocational School and Hopa Vocational School, which were created by changing its name and connection and connected to the Rectorate while affiliated to the Rectorate of Karadeniz Technical University,
- The Institute of Social Sciences and the Institute of Natural and Applied Sciences established under the Rectorate.”

On August 13, 2007, Prof. Dr. İbrahim ÖZEN, Rector of Karadeniz Technical University, was appointed as the Rector (by proxy) of Artvin Çoruh University. After the Council of Higher Education determined the Rector candidates at the 12th General Assembly meeting on August 12, 2008, Prof. Dr. Mehmet Duman was appointed as the Founding Rector of Artvin Çoruh University by President Abdullah Gül on September 10, 2008 with the decision numbered 2008/52 and started his duty on September 16, 2008.

Prof. Dr. Mehmet Duman served between 2008-2016. Prof. Dr. Fahrettin Tilki was then appointed as the rector of the university. Fahrettin Tilki served until January 2020. In January 2020, Prof. Dr. Mustafa Sıtkı Bilgin served as the rector until April 10, 2025. As of this date, Prof. Dr. İbrahim Aydın has been appointed as the new rector and currently holds the position.

Among the units affiliated to our university, Artvin Vocational High School-1990, Artvin Faculty of Forestry-1993, School of Health-1996, Artvin Faculty of Education-2002, Hopa Vocational School-1988, Faculty of Arts and Sciences-2007, Institute of Science-2007, Institute of Social Sciences-2007, Yusufeli Vocational High School-2007, Arhavi Vocational High School-2007 were established in 2007. In addition, the establishment of the Faculty of Engineering and Hopa Faculty of Economics and Administrative Sciences (proposed as the Faculty of Business Administration), which were proposed to be established to YÖK, was accepted and the process was initiated.

In the 2021-22 academic year, a total of 11194 students were studying, including 5987 associate degree students, 4667 undergraduate students, 504 graduate students and 36 doctoral students. As of 2022, the university had 565 academic staff, including 24 professors, 62 associate professors, 165 doctors, 194 lecturers and 120 research assistants.

== Affiliations ==
The university is a member of the Caucasus University Association.
