= Arifana =

Arifana is a type of celebration in Turkish tradition, especially in Artvin. Usually taking place in winter, it is a festival incorporating song, dance, theatre, and feasting. Rams are slaughtered and made into kebabs and roasts and served with sweet pastries. The expenses of the Arifana are paid equally by the participants, although the poor and visitors are not required to pay.
