= Artvin Province =

Province of Turkey

Coordinates: 41°08′N 041°51′E

Artvin Province Artvin ili
- Province
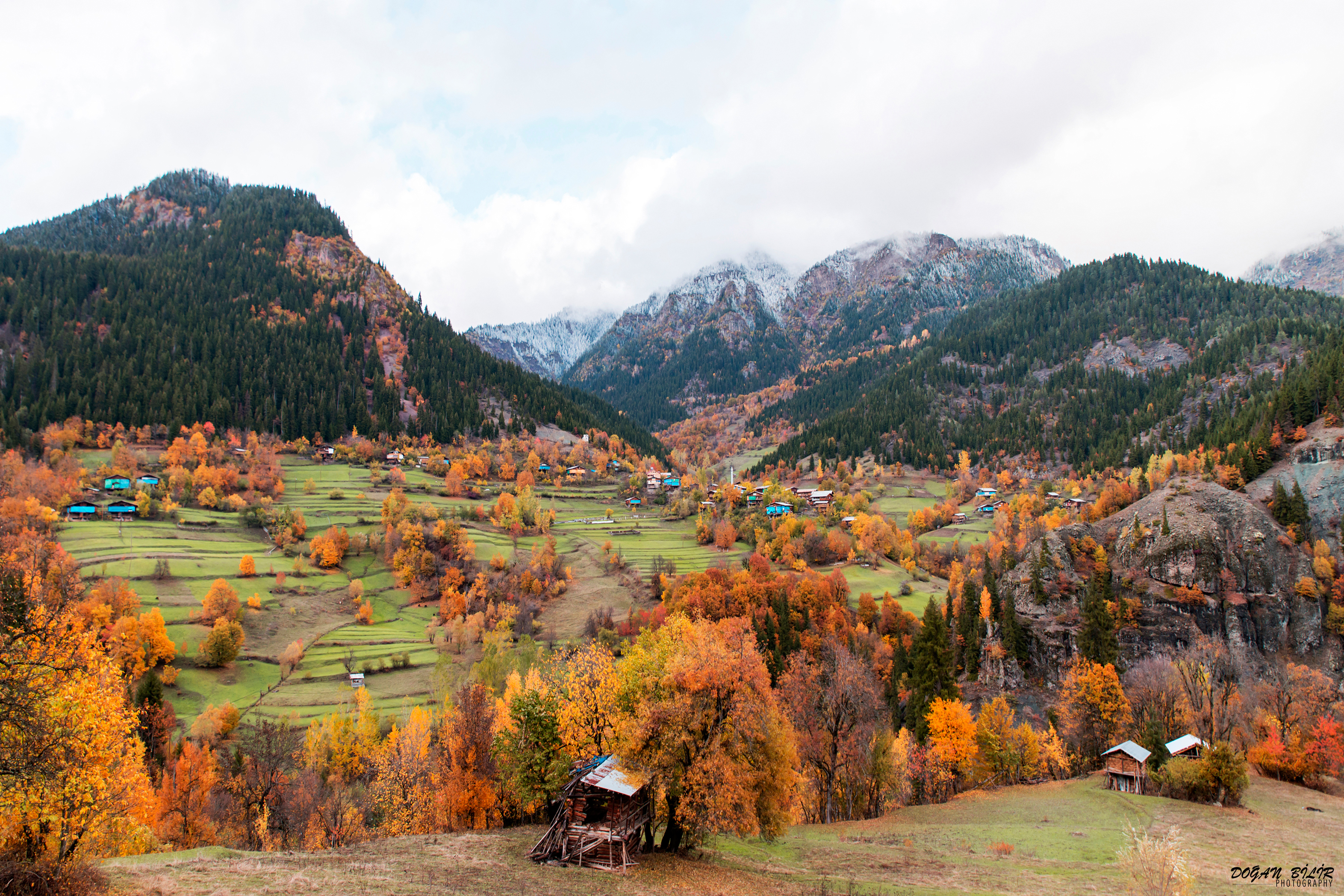
- Çağlıyan, Şavşat, Artvin Province

- Location of the province within Turkey
- Country: Turkey
- Seat: Artvin

Government
  - Governor: Turan Ergün
- Area: 7,393 km^{2} (2,854 sq mi)
- Population (2022): 169,403
  - Density: 22.91/km^{2} (59.35/sq mi)
- Time zone: UTC+3 (TRT)
- Area code: 0466
- Website: www.artvin.gov.tr

Artvin Province (Turkish: Artvin ili; Georgian: ართვინის პროვინცია, Artvinis p'rovintsia; Laz: ართვინიშ დობადონა Artvinish dobadona;) is a province in Turkey, on the Black Sea coast in the northeastern corner of the country, on the border with Georgia. Artvin also borders the Turkish provinces of Erzurum, Ardahan and Rize. Its area is 7,393 km^{2}, and its population is 169,403 (2022). The provincial capital is the city of Artvin.

== Geography ==
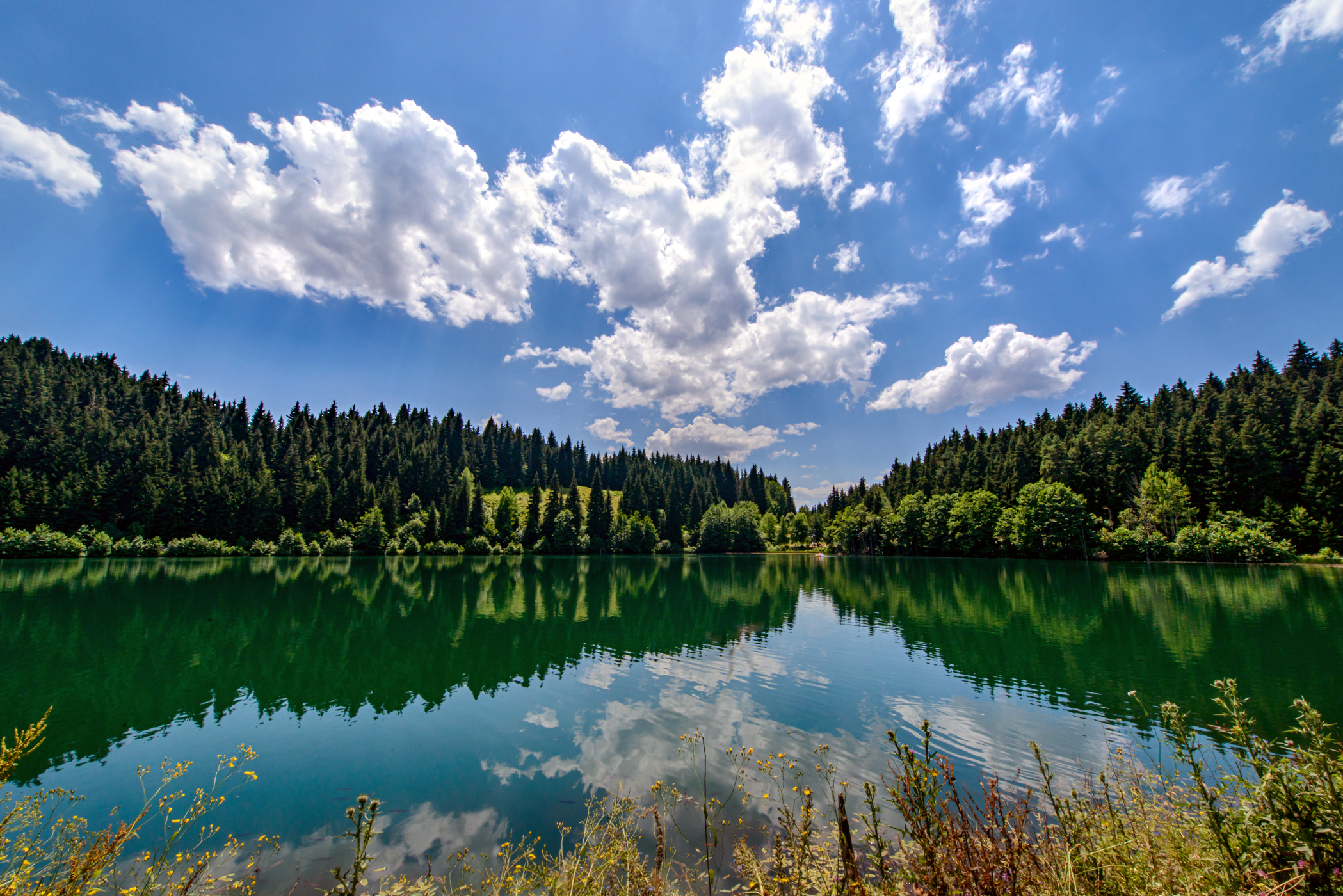
Karagöl-Sahara National Park

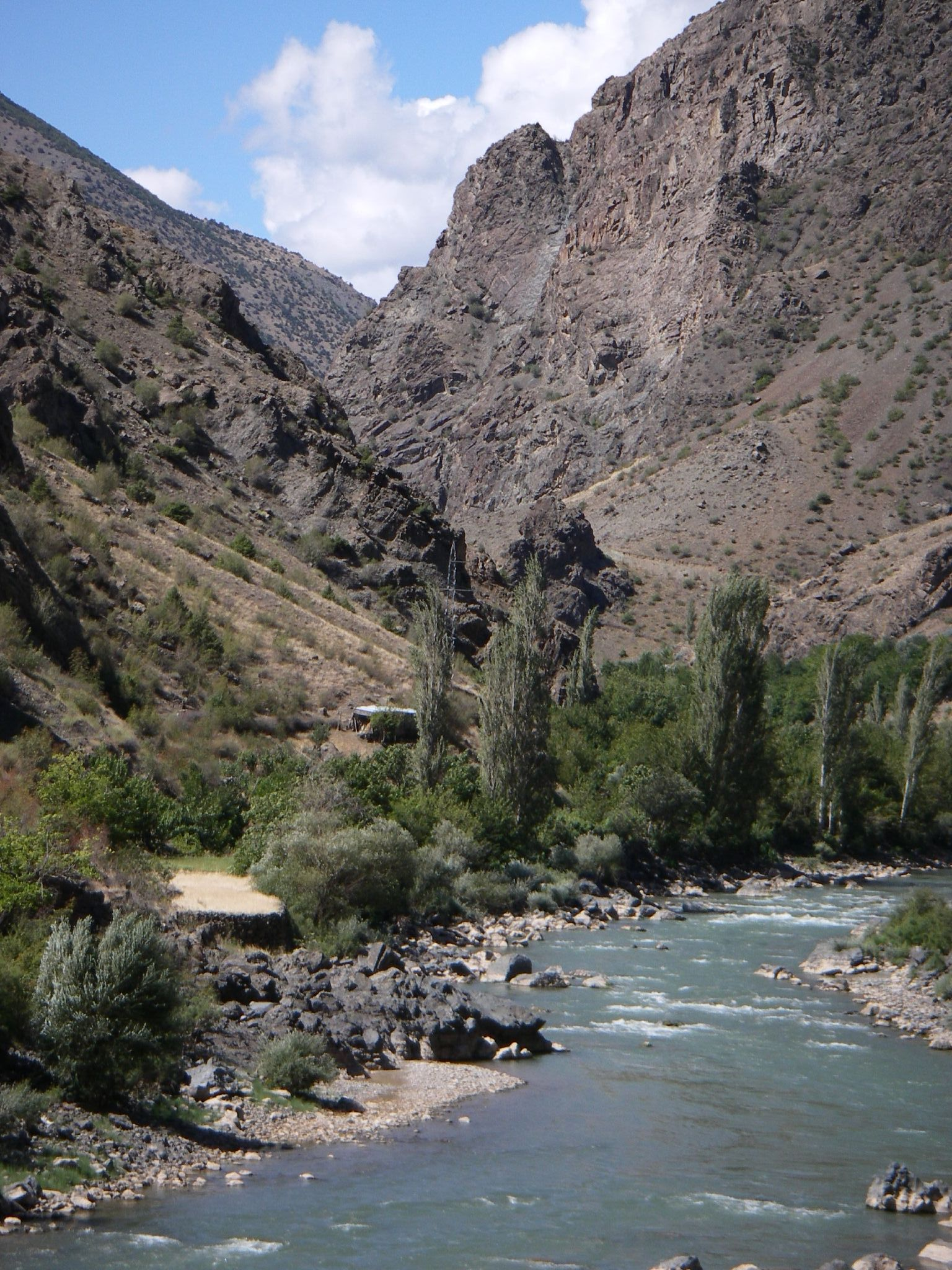

Artvin is an attractive area of steep valleys carved by the Çoruh River system, surrounded by high mountains of Kaçkar, Karçal and Yalnızçam (up to 3900 m) and forest with much national parkland including the Karagöl-Sahara, which contains the Şavşat and Borçka lakes. The weather in Artvin is very wet and mild at the coast, and as a result is heavily forested. This greenery runs from the top all the way down to the Black Sea coast. The rain turns to snow at higher altitudes, and the peaks are very cold in winter.

The forests are home to brown bears and wolves. The Çoruh is now being dammed in 11 places for hydro-electric power, including the 249 m Deriner Dam and others at Borçka and Muratlı.

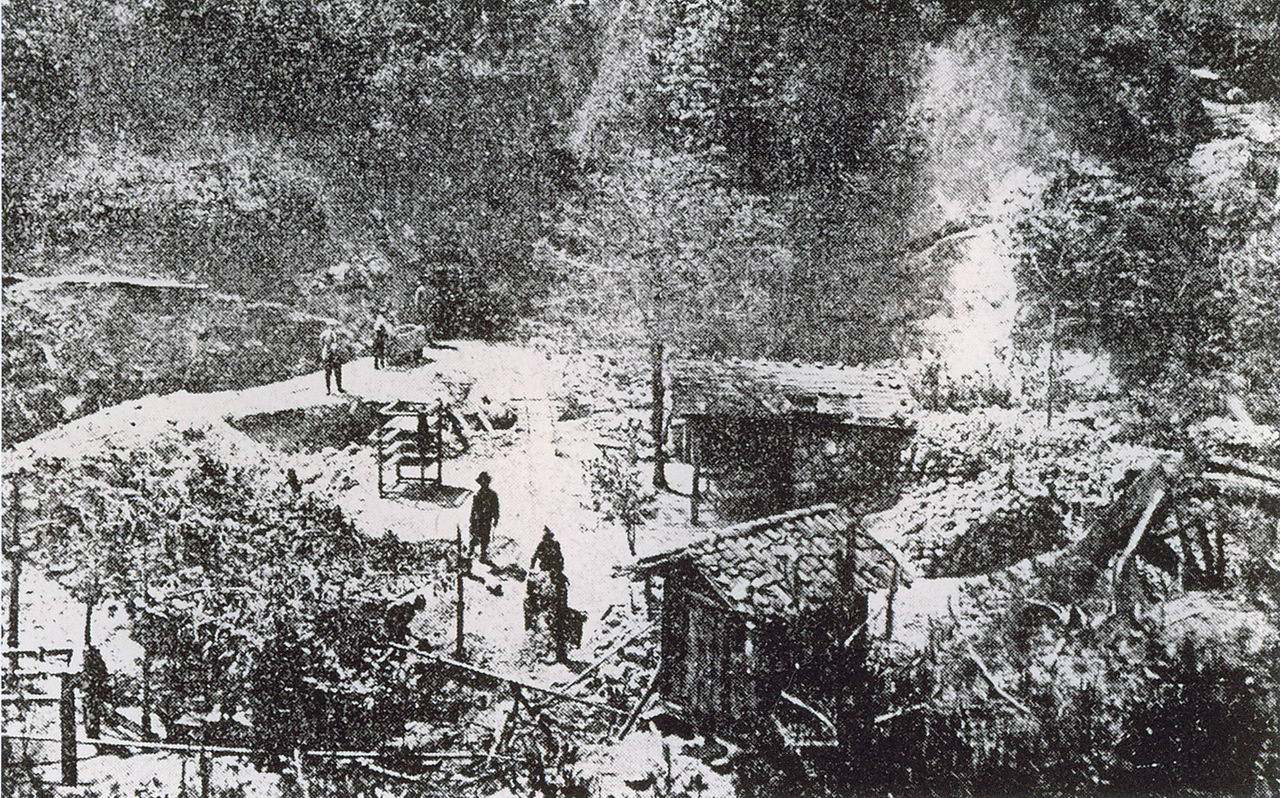
Hopa mines, 1900s

Local industries include bee-keeping especially in Macahel region.

Artvin is traversed by the northeasterly line of equal latitude and longitude.

== Demographics ==
Historical population
Year	Pop.	±% p.a.
1927	90,066	—
1960	196,301	+2.39%
1970	225,869	+1.41%
1980	228,997	+0.14%
1990	212,833	−0.73%
2000	191,934	−1.03%
2010	164,759	−1.52%
2020	169,501	+0.28%
Source:Turkstat

In addition to the ethnic Turks, the province is home to communities of Laz people and Hemshin peoples. Autochthonous Muslim Georgians (Imerkhevians) form the majority in parts of Artvin Province east of the Çoruh River. Immigrant groups of Georgian origins, found scattered in Turkey are known as Chveneburi. In particular, there is a prominent community of Chveneburi Georgians, many of them descendants of Muslim families from Georgia who migrated during the struggles between the Ottoman Empire and Russian Empire during the 19th century. With such diverse peoples, Artvin has a rich variety of folk song and dance (see Arifana and Kochari for examples of folk culture).

== Places of interest ==
- The city of Artvin has an ancient castle and a number of Ottoman period houses, mosques, and fountains.
- Every June, there is a "bull-wrestling" festival in the high plateau of Kafkasör
- The Parekhi monastery, a Georgian monastery

Popular places for walking and outdoor expeditions.

- The Kaçkar Mountains are among the most-popular venues for trekking holidays in Turkey.
- Macahel Valley on the Georgian border, is another popular location for walking holidays.
- Papart forest in Şavşat
- Genciyan Hill in Şavşat, overlooks the border
- The lakes of Şavşat and Borçka and the crater lake of Kuyruklu.
- The Çoruh River is excellent for rafting and championships have been held here
- There are a number of Georgian churches in the valleys of Yusufeli.
- Bilbilan Yaylası - a typical Turkish high meadow.
- Savangin pre-historical cave with an inscription written in an unknown or unsolved alphabet

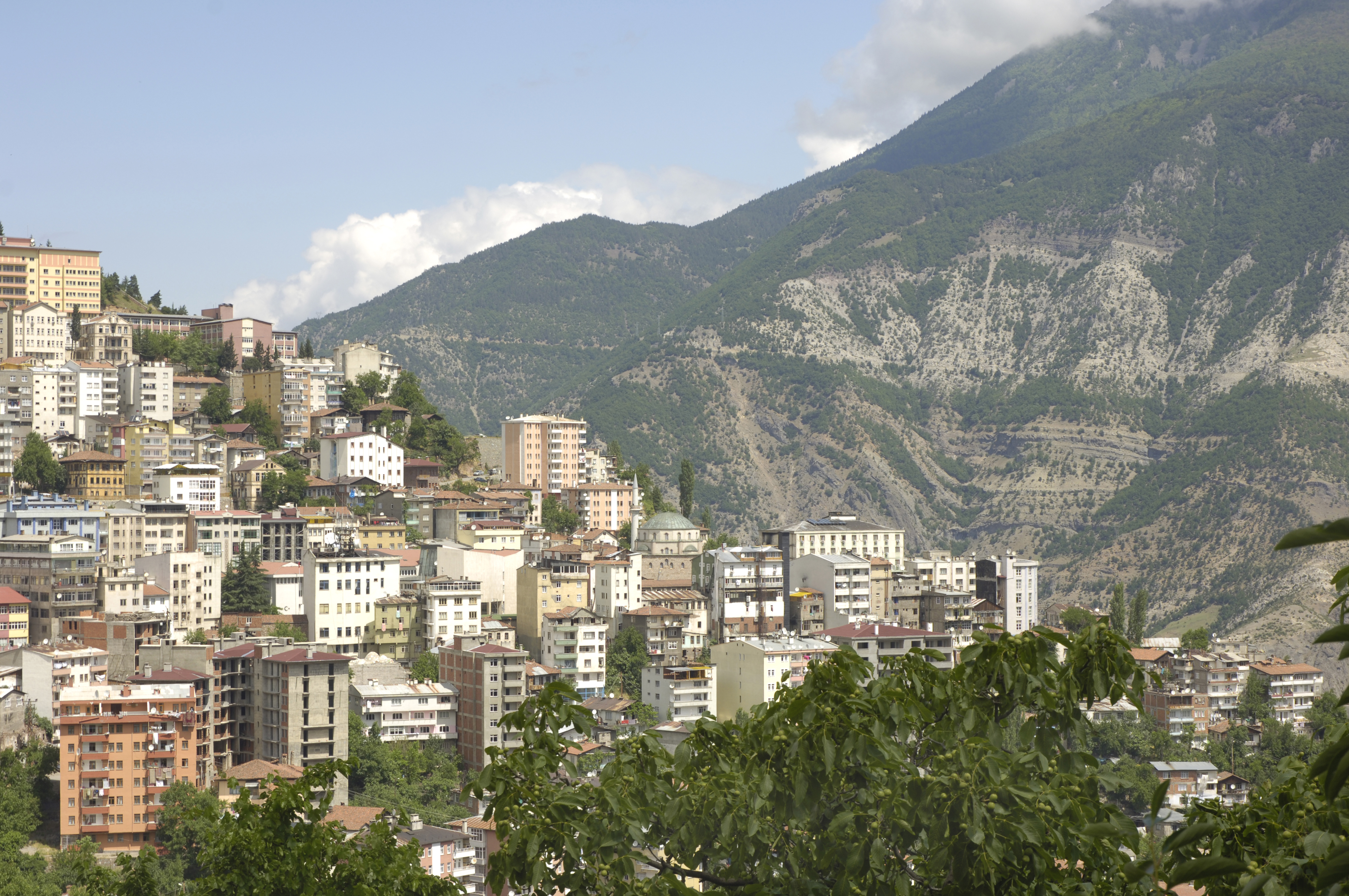
General view of Artvin

== Notable people ==
- Prochorus the Iberian (985-1066), Georgian monk and founder of the Monastery of the Cross in Jerusalem. Born in Shavsheti.
- Ioane Petritsi, Georgian Neoplatonist philosopher of the 11th-12th century. Born in the village of Chimchimi in modern Yusufeli.
- Ioane Shavteli, Georgian poet of the late 12th and early 13th centuries. Born in the village of Shavmta in Shavsheti.
- Ahmet Hamdi Tanpınar (1901-1962), Turkish poet, novelist, literary scholar, essayist. His father is of Georgian descent from Maçahel.
- Zülfü Livaneli, singer and politician, born into a family from Yusufeli.
- Mircan Kaia, singer, composer and engineer, born into a Laz-Georgian family from Artvin.
- Kazım Koyuncu, Laz folk rock singer, guitarist and composer, born in Artvin's Black Sea town of Hopa
- Beyazıt Öztürk, Turkish television personality, standup comedian and actor. His father is of Georgian descent from Ardanuç.
- Özcan Alper, Turkish film director and screenwriter of Hemshin descent.
- Algı Eke, Turkish actress. Born into a Georgian family from Artvin.
- Zeynep Sonmez, Turkish tennis player.

== Districts ==
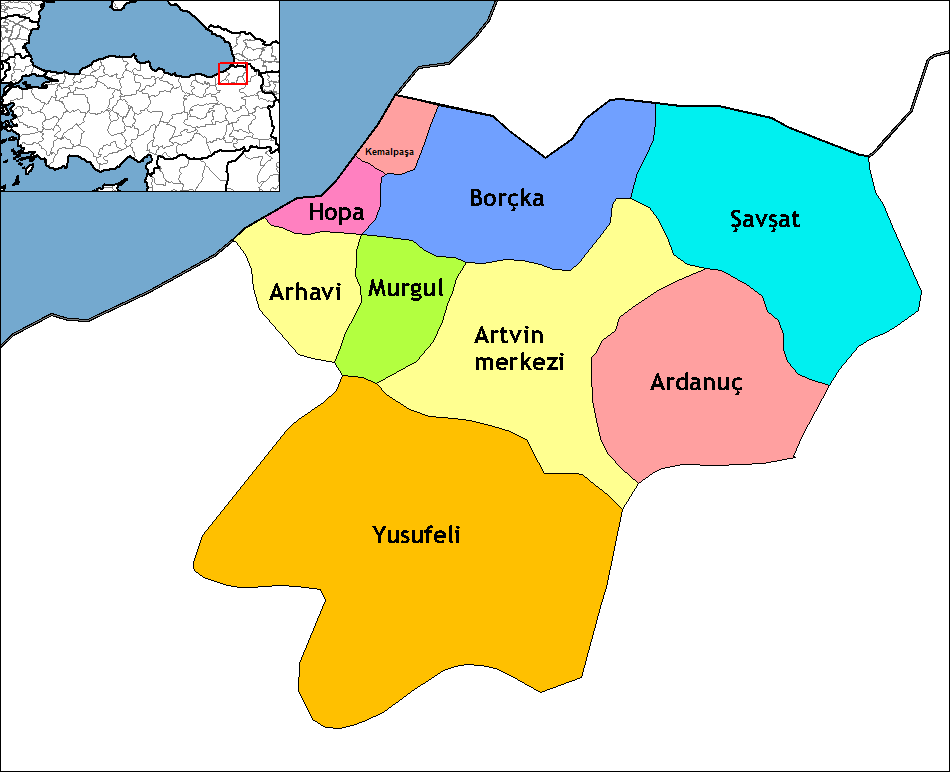
Districts of the Province of Artvin. Central district also has the same name just like most provinces in Turkey.

In 1924, the Liva Sanjak was abolished and the Artvin Vilayet was created. Artvin Vilayet was combined with Rize to form Çoruh Vilayet with the capital at Rize. Later it was separated into Artvin Province with the districts of Ardanuç, Arhavi, Artvin, Borçka, Hopa, Murgul, Şavşat and Yusufeli.

Artvin province is divided into 9 districts (capital district in bold):

- Ardanuç
- Arhavi
- **Artvin**
- Borçka
- Hopa
- Kemalpaşa
- Murgul
- Şavşat
- Yusufeli

== Sister cities ==
- (Georgia (country)) Akhaltsikhe, Georgia
- Casablanca, Morocco
- (Georgia (country)) Batumi, Georgia

== See also ==
- Arifana
- Kochari
- Tayk
- Tao-Klarjeti
- List of populated places in Artvin Province
