= Yukarışahinler =

Yukarışahinler Jileni Napşit
- Village
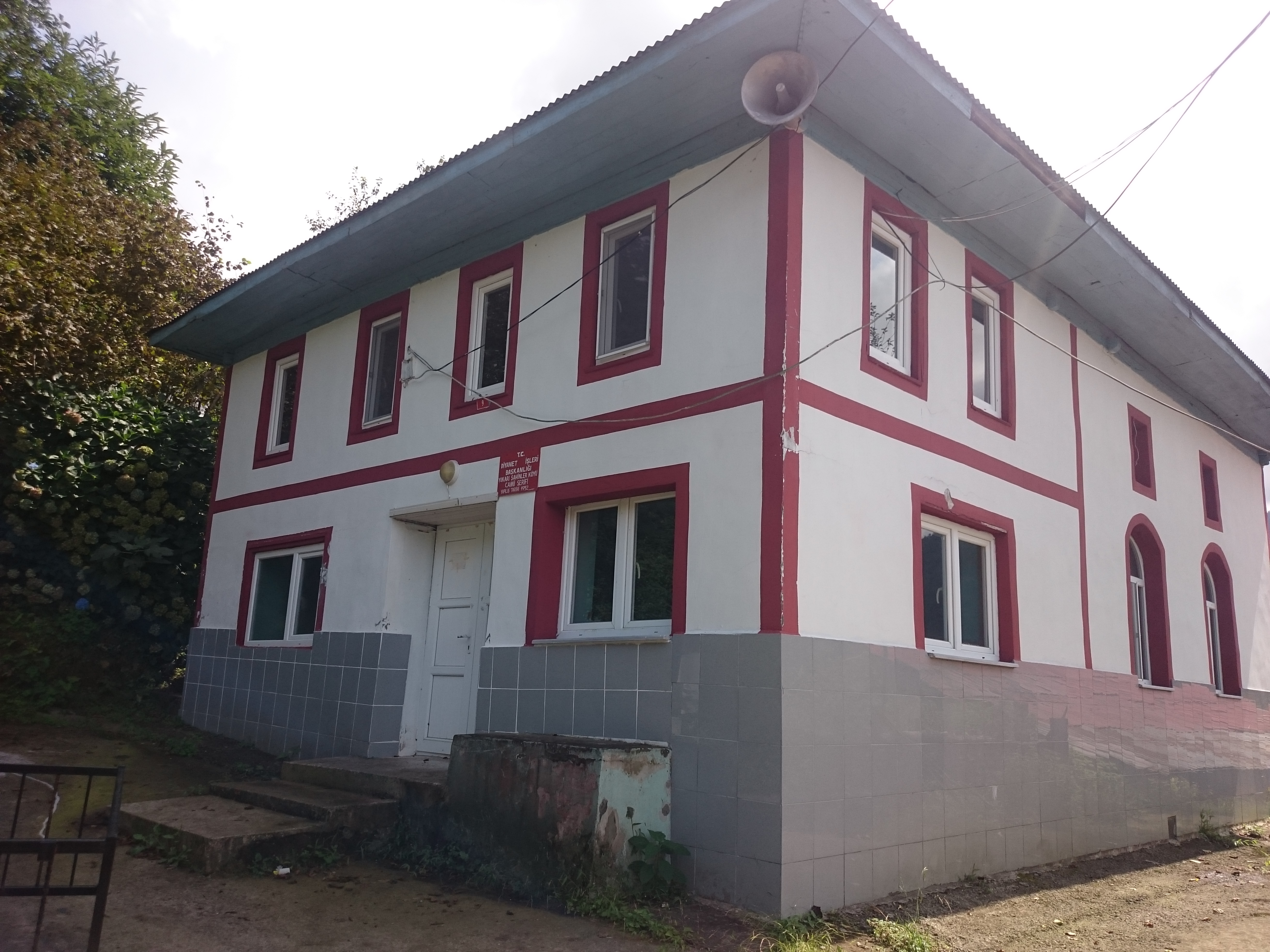
- Mosque of the village

- Location within Turkey
- Coordinates: 41°19′32″N 41°22′9″E
- Country: Turkey
- Province: Artvin
- District: Arhavi

Government
  - Muhtar: Turan Toraman
- Elevation: 328 m (1,076 ft)
- Population (2021): 222
- Time zone: UTC+3 (TRT)

Yukarışahinler is a village in the Arhavi District, Artvin Province, Turkey. Its population is 222 (2021).

== History ==
The old name of village was "Jileni Napshit". Most inhabitants of the village are ethnically Laz.

== Geography ==
Güvercinli is located to the north, Derecik is located to the south, Tepeyurt is located to the east, and Ulukent is located to the west of the village. The altitude of the village is 328 meters. The climate of the village is in the Black Sea climate. The village is 87 km away from the city of Artvin and 11 km away from the Arhavi town center.

== Economy ==
The villages economy is based on agriculture and animal husbandry. There are two place of tea intake belonging to Lipton and Çaykur in village.

== Population ==
Historical population
Year	Pop.	±% p.a.
1985	441	—
1990	377	−3.09%
1997	197	−8.86%
2007	57	−11.66%
2012	151	+21.51%
2017	173	+2.76%
2021	222	+6.43%
Source: Population censuses (1985-1997) and TÜIK (2007-2021)

== Mukhtar ==
Mukhtars according to selected years:

2009 - Turan Toraman
2004 - Coşkun Atalan
1999 - Coşkun Atalan
1994 - Coşkun Atalan
1989 - İmdat Yıldızbayrak
1984 - İmdat Yıldızbayrak
1977 - Mustafa Özyılmaz
1973 - Mustafa Özyılmaz
