= Dikyamaç =

Dikyamaç can refer to:

- Dikyamaç, Arhavi
- Dikyamaç, Kemah
- Dikyamaç Museum
