= Ethmia euphoria =

Scientific classification
- Domain: Eukaryota
- Kingdom: Animalia
- Phylum: Arthropoda
- Class: Insecta
- Order: Lepidoptera
- Family: Depressariidae
- Genus: Ethmia
- Species: E. euphoria

Binomial name
- Ethmia euphoria Kun, 2007

Species of moth

Ethmia euphoria is a moth in the family Depressariidae. It was described by Andras Kun in 2007. It is found in Turkey (Pontus Mountains) and in the Caucasus in Russia.

== Etymology ==
The species name refers to the joyful feeling of the author when discovering the new species.
