= Dikyamaç Museum =

Museum in Arhavi District, Turkey

- Dikyamaç Müzesi
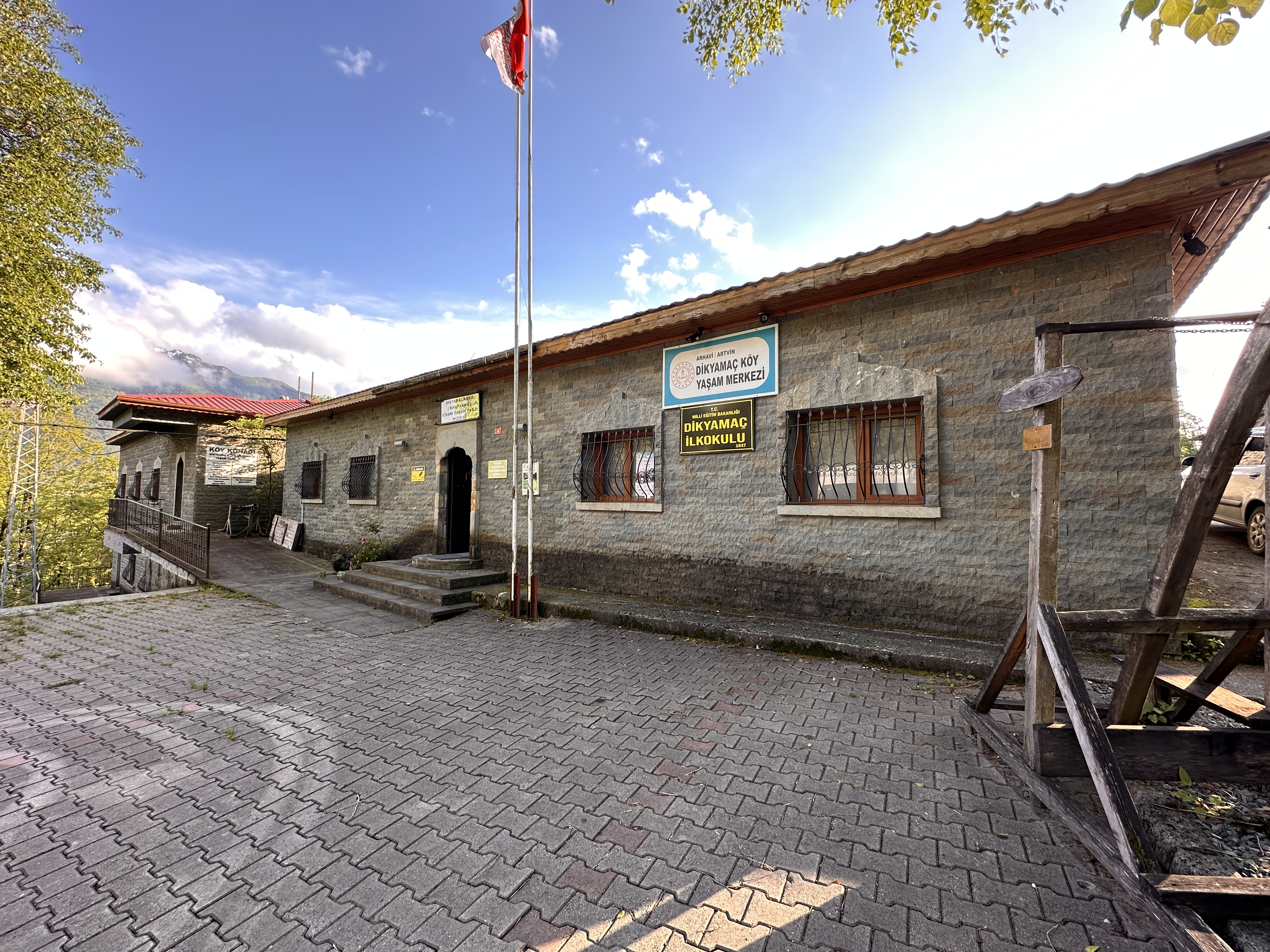
- Dikyamaç Museum in 2024

- Location of Dikyamaç Museum in Turkey.
- Established: 2012; 14 years ago
- Location: Dikyamaç, Arhavi, Artvin Province, Turkey
- Coordinates: 41°17′21″N 41°22′15″E
- Type: Ethnography, memorial

Dikyamaç Village Lifestyle Museum (Turkish: Dikyamaç Köyü Yaşam Tarzı Müzesi), shortly Dikyamaç Museum, is an ethnography museum in Artvin Province, northeastern Turkey.

The museum was founded in the village of Dikyamaç, known formerly as Kamparna, in Arhavi ilçe (district) of Artvin Province at 41°17′21″N 41°22′15″E. When established, the private museum was unique in Artvin Province as being the only museum of the province.

The museum was established by the businessman Naim Özkazanç and Professor Maksut Coşkun in 2012. The exhibited items are former and current house tools and clothes.
