= Yolgeçen =

Yolgeçen (literally "roads pass through," meaning a place where many travelers pass through on their way elsewhere) is a Turkish place name that may refer to the following places in Turkey:

- Yolgeçen, Arhavi, a village in the district of Arhavi, Artvin Province
- Yolgeçen, Seyhan, a village in the district of Seyhan, Adana Province
