= Yukarı Hacılar =

Yukarı Hacılar P'ayante
- Neighbourhood
- Location in Turkey
- Coordinates: 41°19′N 41°21′E
- Country: Turkey
- Province: Artvin
- District: Arhavi
- Municipality: Arhavi
- Population (2021): 883
- Time zone: UTC+3 (TRT)

Yukarı Hacılar (Laz: P'ayante) is a neighbourhood of the town Arhavi, Arhavi District, Artvin Province, Turkey. Its population is 883 (2021).
