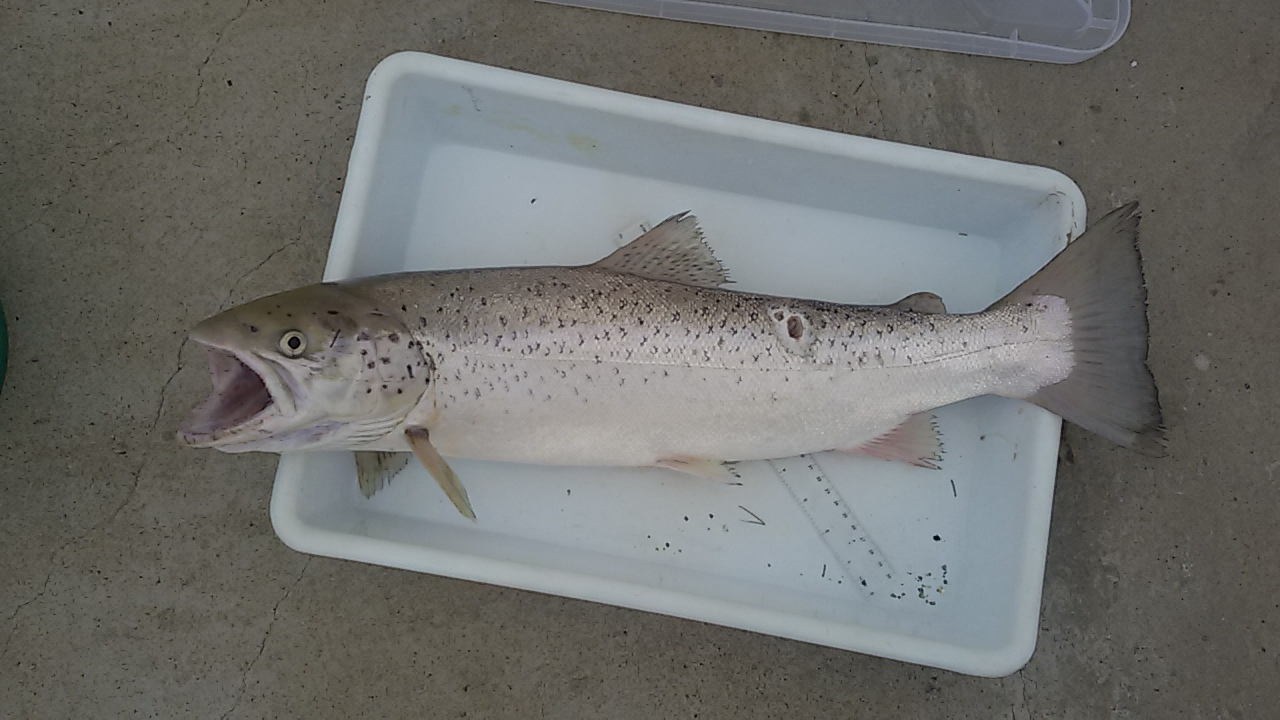
- Black Sea salmon from the Gulf of Odesa, Ukraine

Conservation status
- Least Concern (IUCN 3.1)

Scientific classification
- Kingdom: Animalia
- Phylum: Chordata
- Class: Actinopterygii
- Division: Teleostei
- Order: Salmoniformes
- Family: Salmonidae
- Genus: Salmo
- Species: S. labrax

Binomial name
- Salmo labrax Pallas, 1814

= Black Sea salmon =

Variety of salmonid fish endemic to Black Sea

The Black Sea salmon (Salmo labrax or Salmo trutta labrax), also known as the Black Sea trout or the Turkish sea trout, is a salmonid fish found in and around the coast of the Black Sea, Azov Sea, and in-flowing rivers in Northeastern Turkey, Ukraine, Russia, and the Caucauses. There are anadromous, lacustrine and resident river ecotypes. Black Sea salmon are often considered subspecies of Salmo trutta, the brown trout, and can interbreed with other subspecies of brown trout found throughout Europe.

== Taxonomy ==
While Black Sea salmon were initially classified as a distinct species by the Prussian Zoologist Peter Simon Pallas in 1811, a number of analyses using genetic evidence have shown that Black Sea salmon are closely related to other brown trout lineages, with an ambiguous degree of separation. Mitochondrial DNA analysis of Salmo trutta populations overall places the Black Sea population in the Danubian lineage, alongside fish from the Caspian Sea, Aral Sea, and Persian Gulf. A later analysis of mitochondrial Cytochrome b protein genes indicated that Black Sea and Caspian Sea lineages were mostly closely related, forming a monophyletic group divergent from Atlantic, Mediterranean, Northern, and Baltic Sea lineages. Experimental crosses between Black Sea salmon and other Turkish Salmo trutta lineages reveal no evidence of reproductive isolation, with further genetic analysis revealing genetic distances between 0.002 and 0.007% within the broader Danubian lineage.

Despite the large amount of evidence for Black Sea salmon as a Salmo trutta subspecies, many registers of marine species including WoRMS and the IUCN Red List list Salmo labrax as a separate species.

== Distribution and range ==
Black Sea salmon are endemic to the Black Sea, the nearby Azov sea, and the rivers that drain into the Black Sea: the Firtina, Kapisre, Çağlayan, Iyidere and Solakli rivers in Eastern Turkey, the Çoruh river and its tributaries, including the Machakhelistsqali, between Turkey and Georgia, the Chanistsqali and Kintrishi rivers in Georgia, and the Mzymta river in Russia, as well as their tributaries. Some sources indicate that Salmo trutta labrax is additionally found in rivers draining into the northern and western coasts of the Black Sea, with sightings as far west as the Czech Republic. The Romanian population of Black Sea salmon is well-documented, but rare.

In general, the anadromous ecotype migrates from spawning rivers to the Black Sea at one to three years old. They then remain in coastal waters for one to three additional years before returning to rivers to spawn.

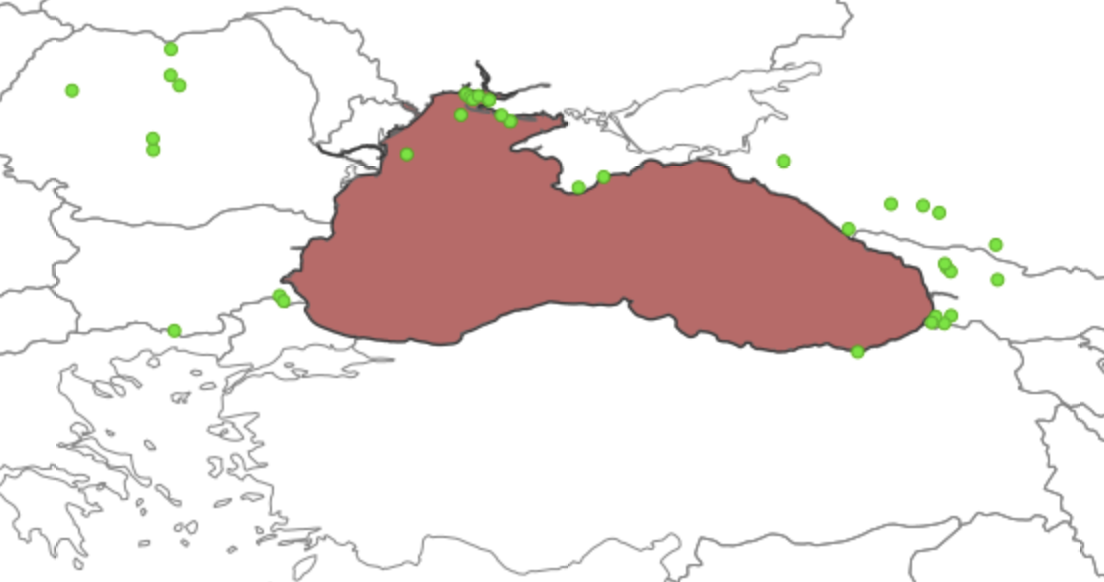
A range map of documented spottings of the Black Sea Salmon, Salmo labrax/Salmo trutta labrax. Data via WoRMS.

=== Conservation Status and Outlook ===
As a largely anadromous species, the Black Sea salmon is vulnerable to disruptions in habitat and environmental conditions both in the rivers where it spawns and in the Black Sea where adults spend the bulk of their lives. While the species is overall considered to be in the "least concern" category by the IUCN, local populations throughout eastern and central Europe are considered locally at risk due to a combination of increased fisheries production and habitat disruption. Additionally, despite a ban in unlicensed fishing put in place in the 1980s, illegal fishing near the Turkey-Georgia border is common, and has put additional stress on the wild population in the southeastern Black Sea.

Increased build-out of hydroelectric dams in Eastern Turkey has led to disruptions in riverine Black Sea salmon habitat, with declines in overall discharge and increases in water temperature associated with a decline of catch per unit effort of 15 fish/hour to 0.5 fish/hour between 2002 and 2017 period.

== Biology ==
=== Anatomy and Physiology ===
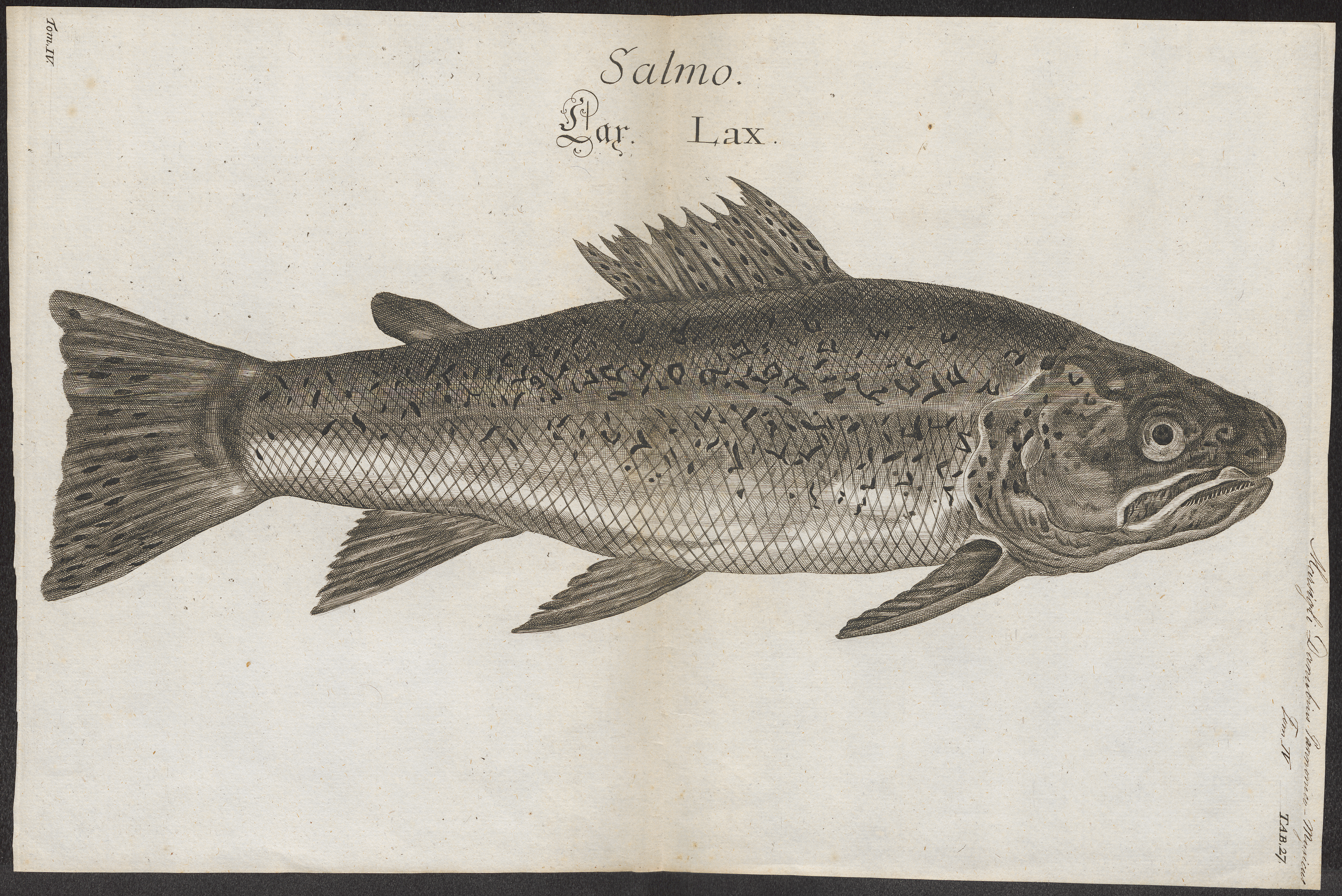
A scientific illustration of Salmo marsilii (synonym to Salmo labrax)

As smolts, Black Sea salmon are 11.5–13 cm in length. At adulthood, females are typically 38.3.8±.87 cm and males are 32.88 ± 1.825 cm from snout to the posterior end of the last vertebra (standard length). The largest recorded specimen was collected in the Firtina stream in Turkey and was 16.5 kg in mass and 98 cm in length.

Typically, they have 14 fin rays in the dorsal fin, ten fin rays in pectoral fins, 14 fin rays in pelvic fins and 12 fin rays in the anal fin. Black Sea salmon generally possess similar meristic characteristics relative to Salmo trutta writ large, though they have a greater number (18-19 vs 15-17) of scales between the adipose fin and the lateral line and a greater number (16-21 vs 13-16) of gill rakers. Relative to other Salmo trutta populations, Black Sea salmon are more silvery in color, with fewer red spots in many cases.

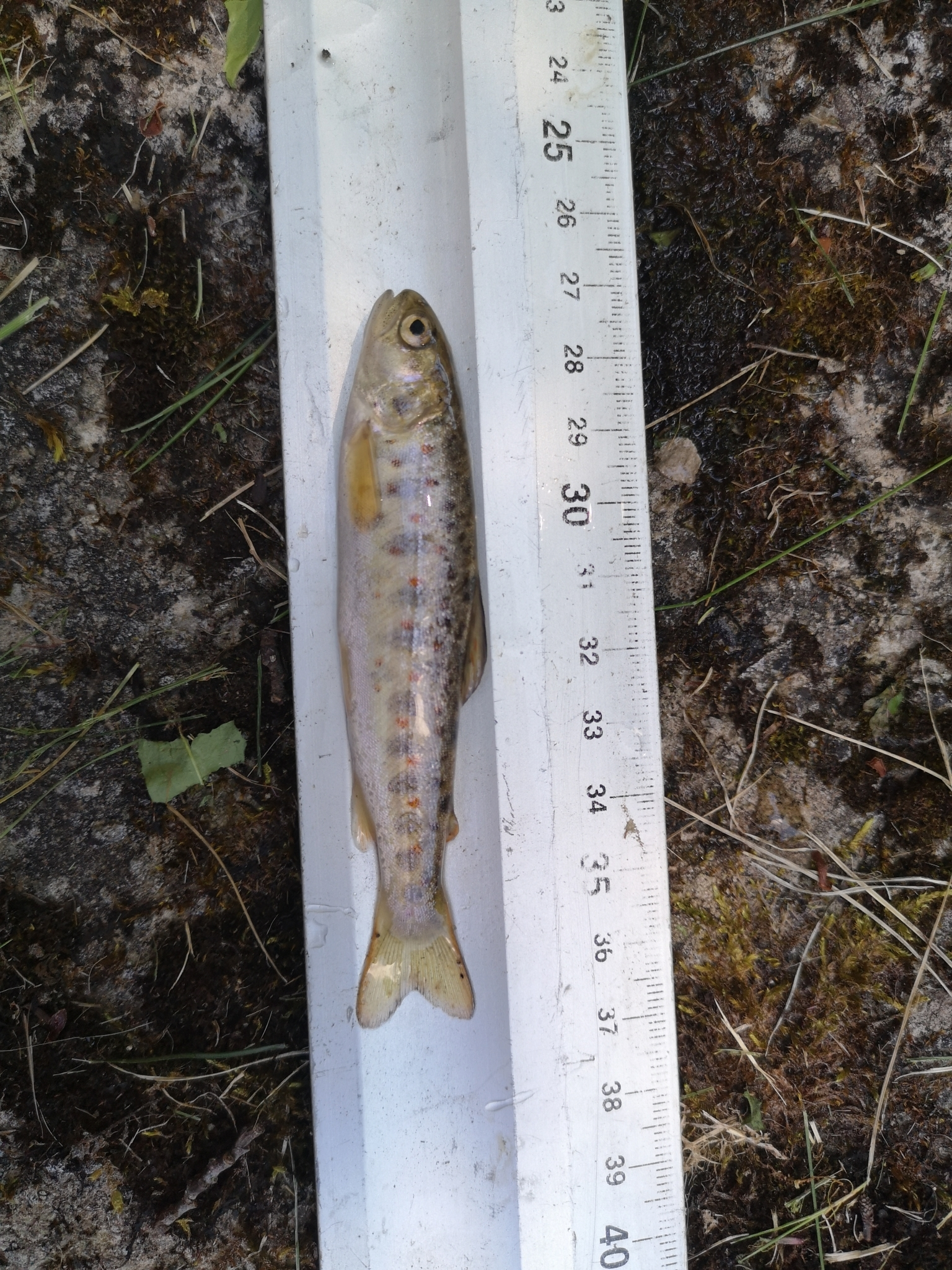
A juvenile black sea salmon (Salmo trutta labrax), measuring about 10 cm.

=== Reproduction ===
In the wild, Black Sea salmon spawn in the late autumn to early winter (October to January), with that period being extended to early Spring in aquaculture settings due to higher average water temperatures at major aquaculture facilities. While the anadromous and riverine ecotypes differ in size and behavior, they constitute a single, freely-interbreeding reproductive group. In particular, anadromous females will mate with smaller riverine males. In addition to hybridization across Salmo trutta varieties, sterile hybrids between Salmo trutta labrax and rainbow trout (Oncorhynchus mykiss) have been produced in hatchery conditions, with hybrids possessing higher growth rates and mature body weights relative to purebred parental lineages; these hybrids may be useful for aquaculture purposes due to those traits.

=== Diet ===
In the wild, juvenile Black Sea salmon feed mostly on small invertebrates like marine insects, while adult fish feed on smaller fishes like sprat and anchovy. Testing in aquaculture settings reveal that diets with between 40 and 50% protein are ideal for Black Sea salmon in farm conditions. Unlike other salmonid varieties, which are known for their pink flesh, Black Sea salmon flesh is typically paler. In aquaculture settings, carotenoid supplementation using astaxanthin, canthaxanthin, or lycopene has been shown to modify flesh coloration and texture, with the addition of 300 ppm astaxanthin to standard feed diets over the course of 90 days of treatment producing fish with flesh strongly visually similar to Atlantic salmon. Carotenoid supplementation also cultivated higher total protein content and lipid quality in farmed Black Sea salmon, though less is known about diet protein content in wild fish.

== Aquaculture ==
Aquaculture production of Black Sea trout began in 1998 at the Adler salmon farm on the Mzymta River in Krasnodar Krai, Russia. The fish has become one of the leading aquaculture varieties in Turkey, with recorded yields of 2070 tons per year in 2018 and 2656 tons per year in 2019. By 2021, 25 different private aquaculture enterprises had been established in Turkey, in Trabzon, Rize, Artvin, Giresun, Gümüşhane and Muş.
