= Yıldızlı =

Yıldızlı (literally "with stars" in Turkish) may refer to the following places in Turkey:

- Yıldızlı, Arhavi, a village in the district of Arhavi, Artvin Province
- Yıldızlı, Baskil
- Yıldızlı, Kemaliye
- Yıldızlı, Kozluk, a village in the district of Kozluk, Batman Province
- Yıldızlı, Polatlı, a village in the district of Polatlı, Ankara Province

== See also ==
- Yıldız (disambiguation)
