= Aşağı Hacılar =

Aşağı Hacılar Borghola
- Neighbourhood
- Location in Turkey
- Coordinates: 41°19′N 41°21′E
- Country: Turkey
- Province: Artvin
- District: Arhavi
- Municipality: Arhavi
- Population (2021): 1,393
- Time zone: UTC+3 (TRT)

Aşağı Hacılar (Laz language: Borghola) is a neighbourhood of the town Arhavi, Arhavi District, Artvin Province, Turkey. Its population is 1,393 (2021). Most inhabitants of the neighbourhood are ethnically Laz.
