= Kestanealan, Arhavi =

Kestanealan
- Village
- Location within Turkey
- Coordinates: 41°19′N 41°22′E
- Country: Turkey
- Province: Artvin
- District: Arhavi
- Population (2021): 138
- Time zone: UTC+3 (TRT)

Kestanealan (Laz language: Chukalvat) is a village in the Arhavi District, Artvin Province, Turkey. Its population is 138 (2021).
