= Dülgerli, Arhavi =

Dülgerli
- Village
- Location within Turkey
- Coordinates: 41.2784°N 41.4319°E
- Country: Turkey
- Province: Artvin
- District: Arhavi
- Population (2021): 106
- Time zone: UTC+3 (TRT)

Dülgerli (Laz language: Potocuri; პოტოჯური) is a village in the Arhavi District, Artvin Province, Turkey. Its population is 106 (2021).
