= Üçırmak, Arhavi =

Üçırmak
- Village
- Location within Turkey
- Coordinates: 41.3012°N 41.4080°E
- Country: Turkey
- Province: Artvin
- District: Arhavi
- Population (2021): 203
- Time zone: UTC+3 (TRT)

Üçırmak (Laz language: Orçi) is a village in the Arhavi District, Artvin Province, Turkey. Its population is 203 (2021).
