= Kaçkar Mountains =

Mountain range in Turkey

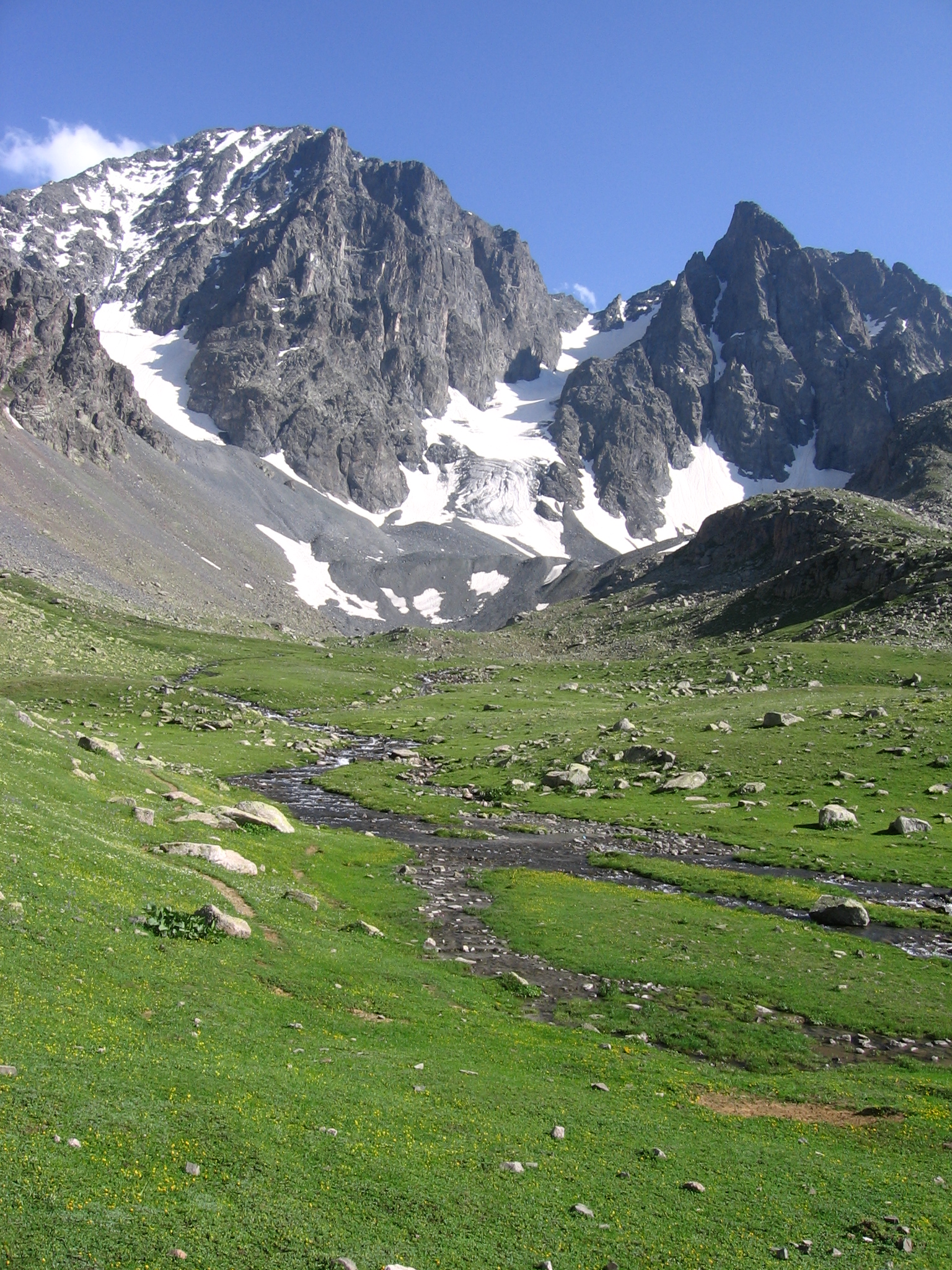
- The highest peak Kaçkar Dağı from Mezovit Çayiri

Highest point
- Peak: Kaçkar Dağı
- Elevation: 3,937 m (12,917 ft)

Dimensions
- Length: 1,000 km (620 mi)

Geography
- Location within Turkey Location within Black Sea Location within Caucasus Mountains
- Country: Turkey
- Range coordinates: 40°50′N 41°9′E

The Kaçkar Mountains (Turkish: Kaçkar Dağları; Armenian: Քաջքար, Kajkar), formerly known as the Lazistan Mountains or the Mountains of Khaghtik(Armenian: Խաղտեաց լեռներ), are a mountain range that rises above the Black Sea coast in northeastern Turkey.

With the highest peak, Kaçkar Dağı, at an elevation of 3,937 metres (12,917 ft), and mountain plateaus at about 3,000 m (9,800 ft) in elevation, the range is the highest part of the Pontic Mountains. The Kaçkars are glaciated mountains that are alpine in character, with steep rocky peaks and numerous mountain lakes. The area was declared a national park in 1994. Recreational activities in the park include hiking, camping, mountaineering, and, increasingly, heliskiing. The Kackar range boasts a wide variety of plants and wildlife such as wolves, bears, boars, feral goats, deer, jackals and wild chickens.

== Etymology ==
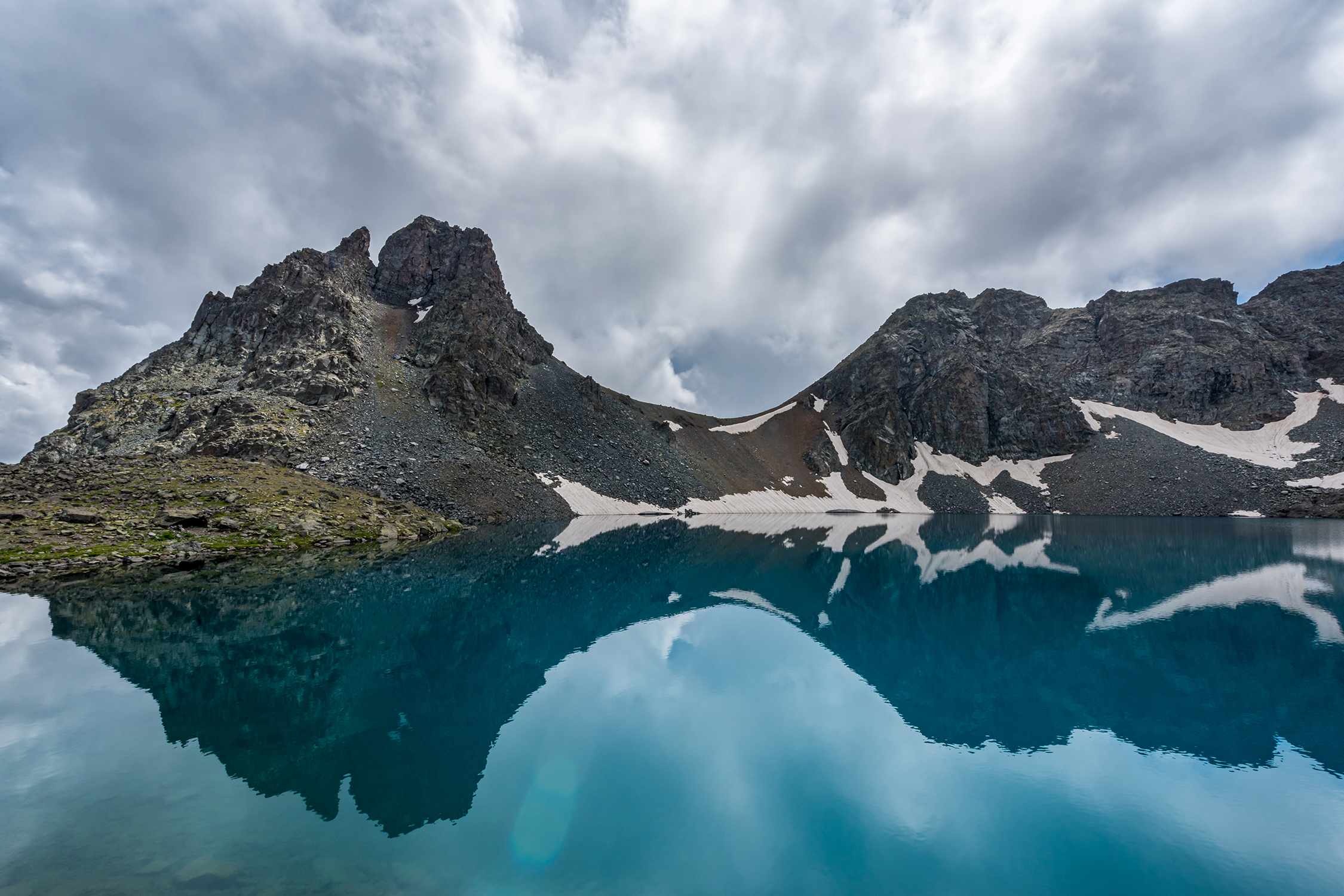
Deniz Gölü

The name Kaçkar derives from the Armenian term khachkar (Խաչքար), which literally means "cross stone". The name may be used in various senses. It may describe the whole mountain range, including the many mountain groups, or it may just describe the Kaçkar-Kavron group with its highest peak, or just the highest peak itself. The local name of the highest peak or its mountain group Kaçkar Dağı translates to Kaçkar Mountain, and the name of the range Kaçkar Dağları translates to Kaçkar Mountains.

== Geography ==
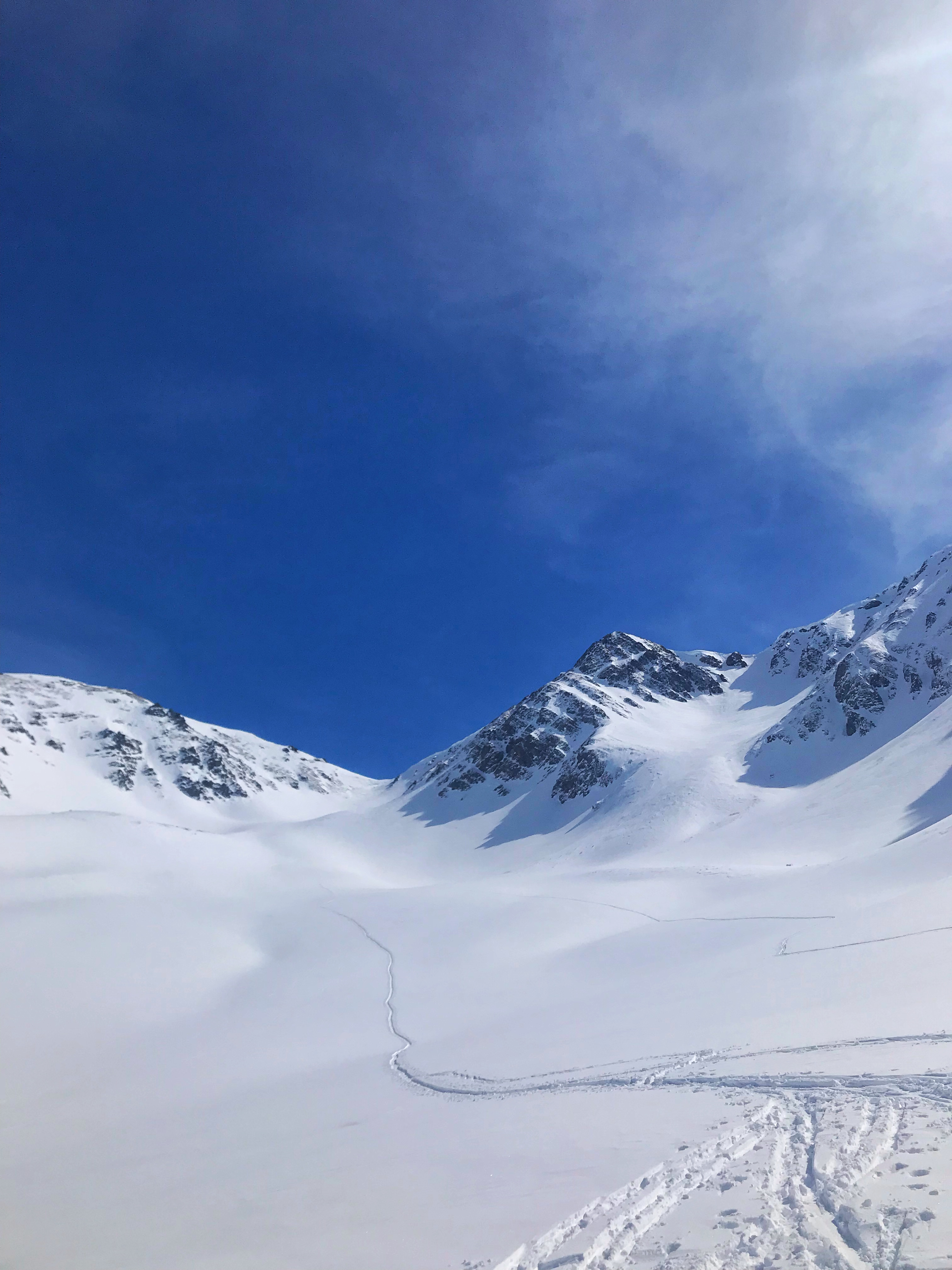
Winter

On the south and east, the Kaçkar Mountains are bordered by the Çoruh river valley; on the north, by the Black Sea coast.

=== Major mountain groups ===
- Altıparmak group
- Kavron (or Kaçkar-Kavron)
- Verçenik group

== Trekking ==
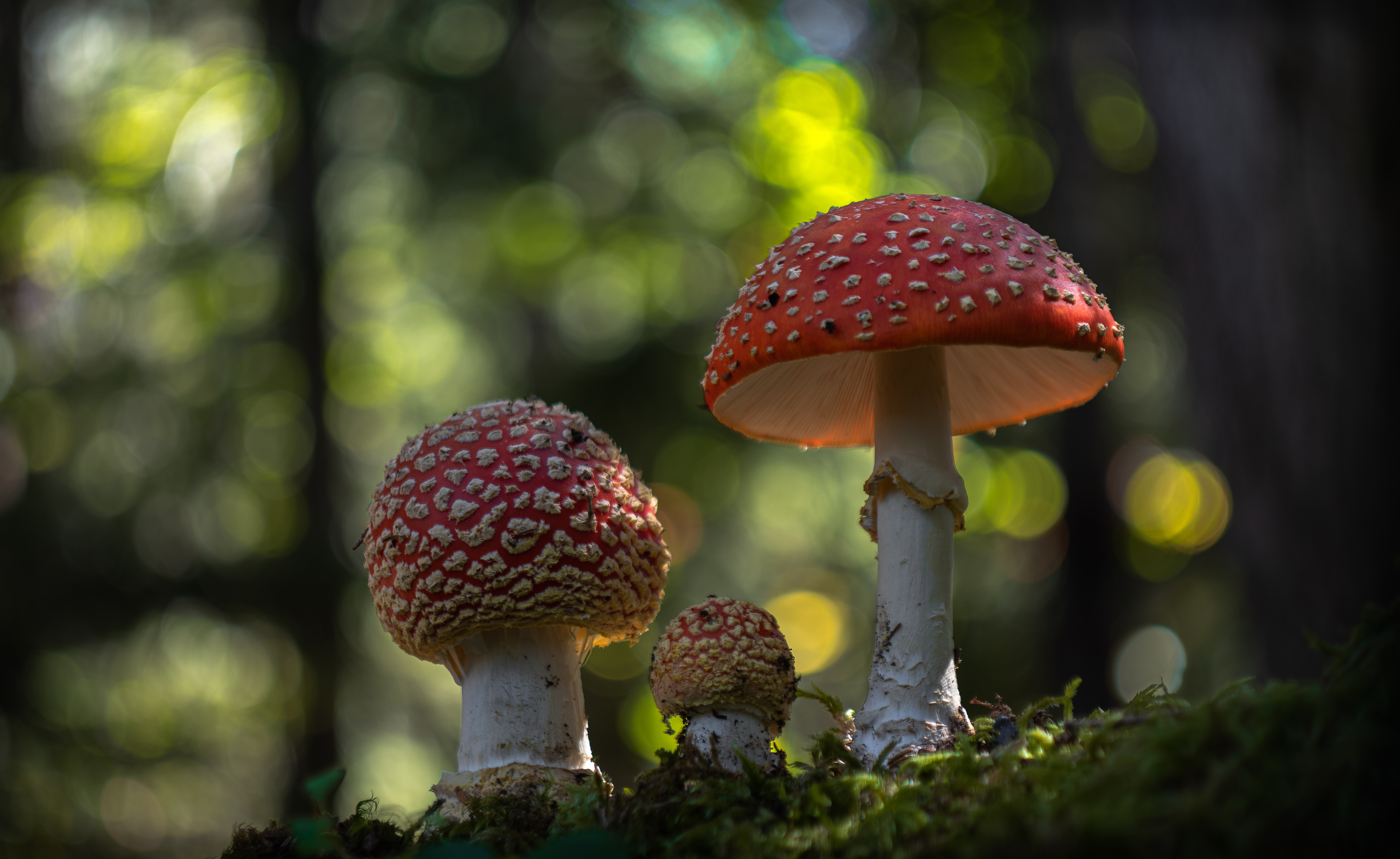
Fly Agaric (Amanita muscaria) near Kaçkar Mountains Çamlıhemşin/Rize

Kaçkar Mountains are one of the best trekking sites in Turkey. Kaçkars have two ideal trekking routes. The first is from the Black Sea side; the path is clear and it is easy to trek, while the Çoruh side is more difficult and hazardous. Kaçkar Mountains are among the most glaciated in Turkey hence ice axes and crampons are required. The best time for trekking is between June and September.

== Gallery ==
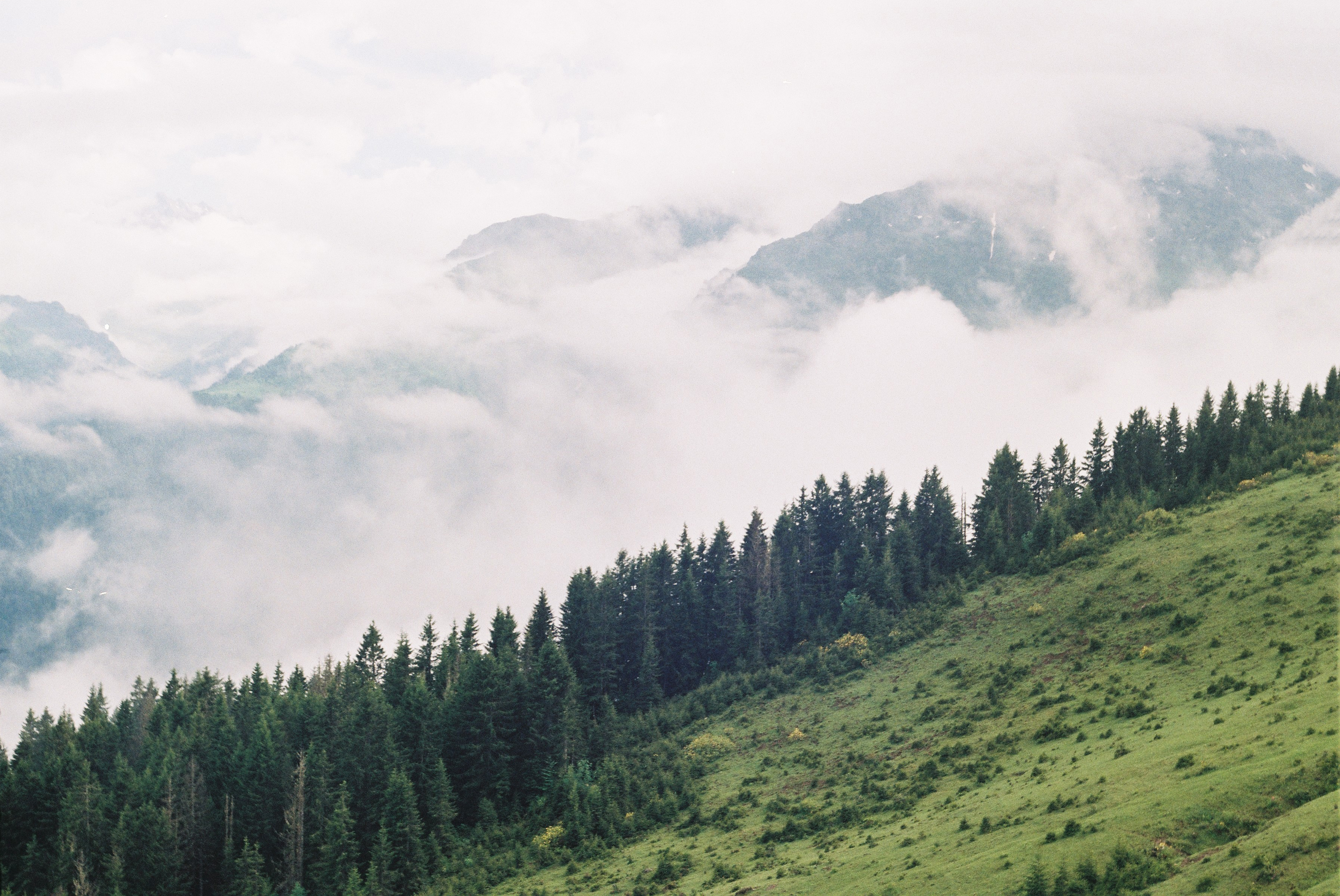
Kaçkar mountains from the view of Gito plateau, a foggy day

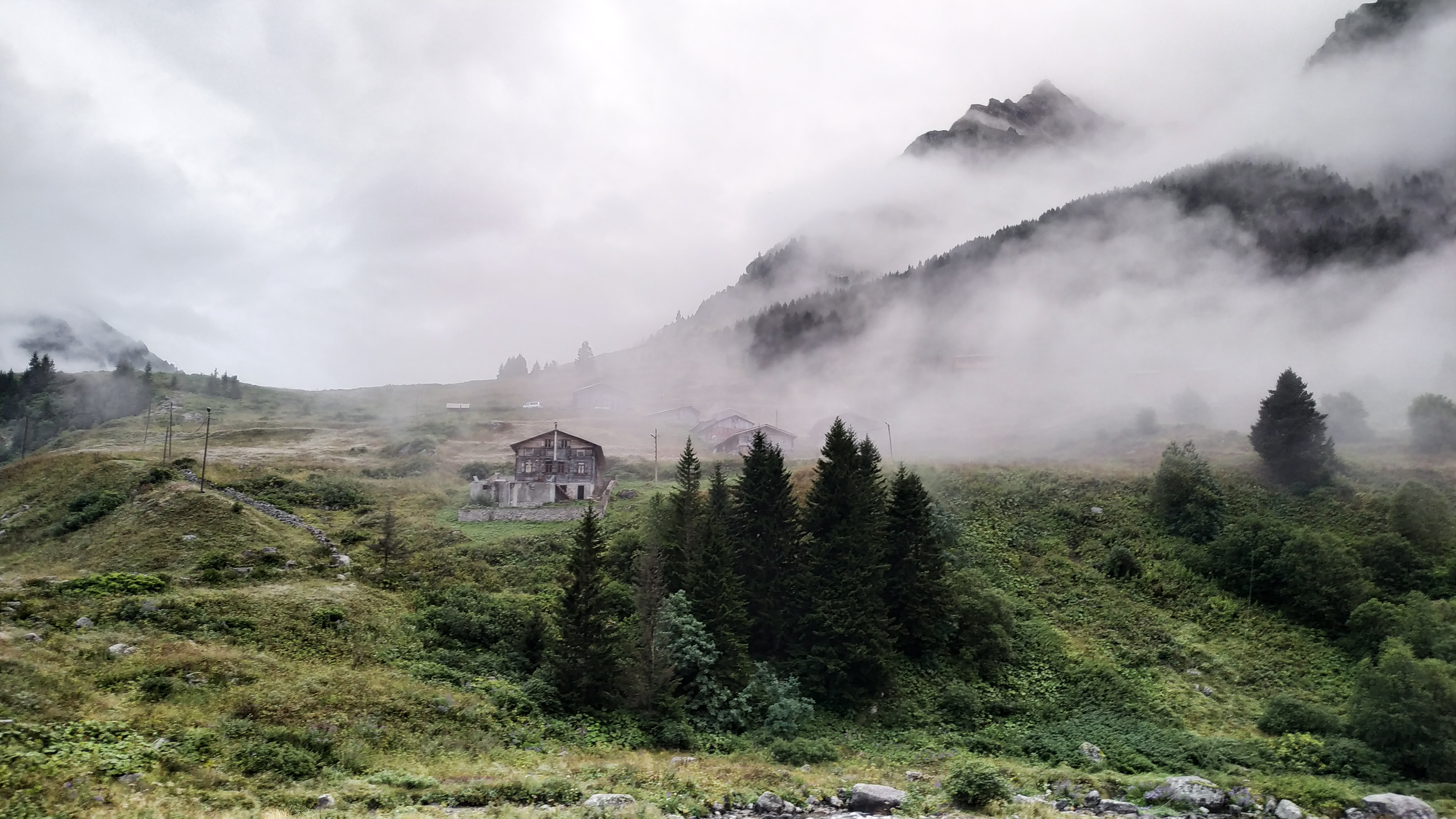
Elevit Plateau, Rize

== See also ==
- Rize
- Çağlayan River
