= Gürgencik =

Gürgencik Koptone
- Village
- Location within Turkey
- Coordinates: 41°17′N 41°21′E
- Country: Turkey
- Province: Artvin
- District: Arhavi
- Population (2021): 44
- Time zone: UTC+3 (TRT)

Gürgencik (Laz: კოპთონე, romanized: k'op'tone) is a village in the Arhavi District, Artvin Province, Turkey. Its population is 44 as of 2021.
