= Boyuncuk, Arhavi =

Boyuncuk
- Village
- Location within Turkey
- Coordinates: 41.2936°N 41.4689°E
- Country: Turkey
- Province: Artvin
- District: Arhavi
- Population (2021): 29
- Time zone: UTC+3 (TRT)

Boyuncuk (Georgian: Parehi) is a village in the Arhavi District, Artvin Province, Turkey. Its population is 29 (2021).
