= Güngören, Arhavi =

Güngören Kapistona
- Village
- Location within Turkey
- Coordinates: 41.3382°N 41.2762°E
- Country: Turkey
- Province: Artvin
- District: Arhavi
- Population (2021): 180
- Time zone: UTC+3 (TRT)
- Climate: Cfb

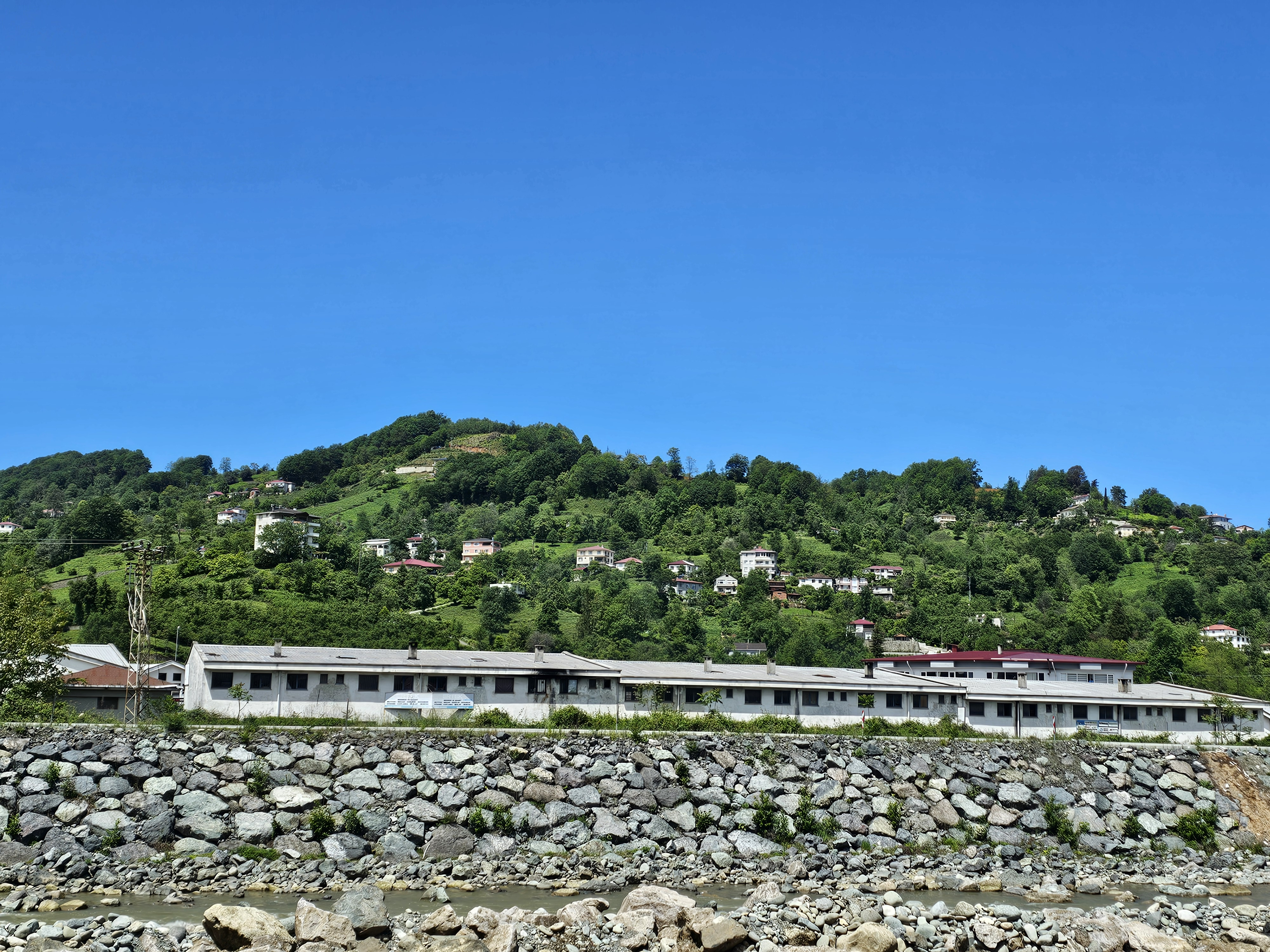
Güngören, Arhavi

Güngören, locally known as Kapistona (Laz and Georgian: კაპისთონა, romanized: k'ap'istona), formerly Kapisre (Note: Ottoman Turkish: قابصرە, romanized: kabisre) is a village in the Arhavi District, Artvin Province, Turkey. Its population is 180 (2021).
