= Ulaş, Arhavi =

Ulaş Durmati
- Village
- Location within Turkey
- Coordinates: 41.2992°N 41.2703°E
- Country: Turkey
- Province: Artvin
- District: Arhavi
- Population (2021): 139
- Time zone: UTC+3 (TRT)

Ulaş (Laz language: Durmati) is a village in the Arhavi District, Artvin Province, Turkey. Its population is 139 (2021).
