= Küçükköy, Arhavi =

Küçükköy
- Village
- Location within Turkey
- Coordinates: 41.2723°N 41.3821°E
- Country: Turkey
- Province: Artvin
- District: Arhavi
- Population (2021): 65
- Time zone: UTC+3 (TRT)

Küçükköy (Laz language: Tsxuleti) is a village in the Arhavi District, Artvin Province, Turkey. Its population is 65 (2021).
