= Kemerköprü, Arhavi =

Kemerköprü Cgiryazeni
- Village
- Location within Turkey
- Country: Turkey
- Province: Artvin
- District: Arhavi
- Population (2021): 141
- Time zone: UTC+3 (TRT)

Kemerköprü (Laz language: Cgiryazeni) is a village in the Arhavi District, Artvin Province, Turkey. Its population is 141 (2021).
