= Konaklı, Arhavi =

Konaklı
- Village
- Location within Turkey
- Coordinates: 41.3169°N 41.3258°E
- Country: Turkey
- Province: Artvin
- District: Arhavi
- Population (2021): 242
- Time zone: UTC+3 (TRT)

Konaklı (Laz language: Kordelit) is a village in the Arhavi District, Artvin Province, Turkey. Its population is 242 (2021).
