= Dereüstü, Arhavi =

Dereüstü Gidreve
- Village
- Location within Turkey
- Coordinates: 41.3059°N 41.3265°E
- Country: Turkey
- Province: Artvin
- District: Arhavi
- Population (2021): 166
- Time zone: UTC+3 (TRT)

Dereüstü (Laz language: Gidreva) is a village in the Arhavi District, Artvin Province, Turkey. Its population is 166 (2021).
