= Aşağışahinler =

- Village
- Location within Turkey
- Coordinates: 41°19′25″N 41°21′30″E
- Country: Turkey
- Province: Artvin
- District: Arhavi
- Population (2021): 84
- Time zone: UTC+3 (TRT)

Aşağışahinler (Laz language: Napshit) is a village in the Arhavi District, Artvin Province, Turkey. Its population is 84 (2021).
