= Güneşli, Arhavi =

Güneşli
- Village
- Location within Turkey
- Country: Turkey
- Province: Artvin
- District: Arhavi
- Population (2021): 72
- Time zone: UTC+3 (TRT)

Güneşli (Laz language: Gviazona; ჯგიაზონა) is a village in the Arhavi District, Artvin Province, Turkey. Its population is 72 (2021).
