= Sırtoba, Arhavi =

Sırtoba
- Village
- Location within Turkey
- Coordinates: 41°18′N 41°23′E
- Country: Turkey
- Province: Artvin
- District: Arhavi
- Population (2021): 142
- Time zone: UTC+3 (TRT)

Sırtoba (Laz language: Ot'alaxe) is a village in the Arhavi District, Artvin Province, Turkey. Its population is 142 (2021).
