= Balıklı, Arhavi =

Balıklı
- Village
- Location within Turkey
- Coordinates: 41.3417°N 41.4222°E
- Country: Turkey
- Province: Artvin
- District: Arhavi
- Population (2021): 114
- Time zone: UTC+3 (TRT)

Balıklı (Laz language: Pilargeti) is a village in the Arhavi District, Artvin Province, Turkey. Its population is 114 (2021).
