= Çağlayan River =

Water stream in Rize province, Turkey

Çağlayan River (Creek)
- Location of mouth

Location
- Country: Turkey

Physical characteristics
- Mouth
  - coordinates: 41°16′46″N 41°08′57″E
- Length: 34.7 kilometres (21.6 mi)

Çağlayan River or Fındıklı River (Laz language: Abu River) is one of the main water streams of Fındıklı in the eastern Black Sea Region of Turkey. Its name is Turkish for cascade.

== Description ==
Çağlayan River rises in Kaçkar Mountains in Fındıklı. The Çağlayan River is 34.7 kilometres (21.6 mi) long. It is a notable spawning place for Black Sea salmon. The Çağlayan River is also a popular place for amateur handline fishing.
