= Üçler, Arhavi =

Üçler
- Village
- Location within Turkey
- Coordinates: 41°18′15″N 41°21′40″E
- Country: Turkey
- Province: Artvin
- District: Arhavi
- Population (2021): 83
- Time zone: UTC+3 (TRT)

Üçler (Laz language: Hekoleni Pici) is a village in the Arhavi District, Artvin Province, Turkey. Its population is 83 (2021).
