= Başköy, Arhavi =

Başköy
- Village
- Location within Turkey
- Coordinates: 41.2753°N 41.3944°E
- Country: Turkey
- Province: Artvin
- District: Arhavi
- Population (2021): 131
- Time zone: UTC+3 (TRT)

Başköy is a village in the Arhavi District, Artvin Province, Turkey. Its population is 131 (2021).
