= Mount Kaçkar =

Highest peak of the Kaçkar Mountains in Turkey

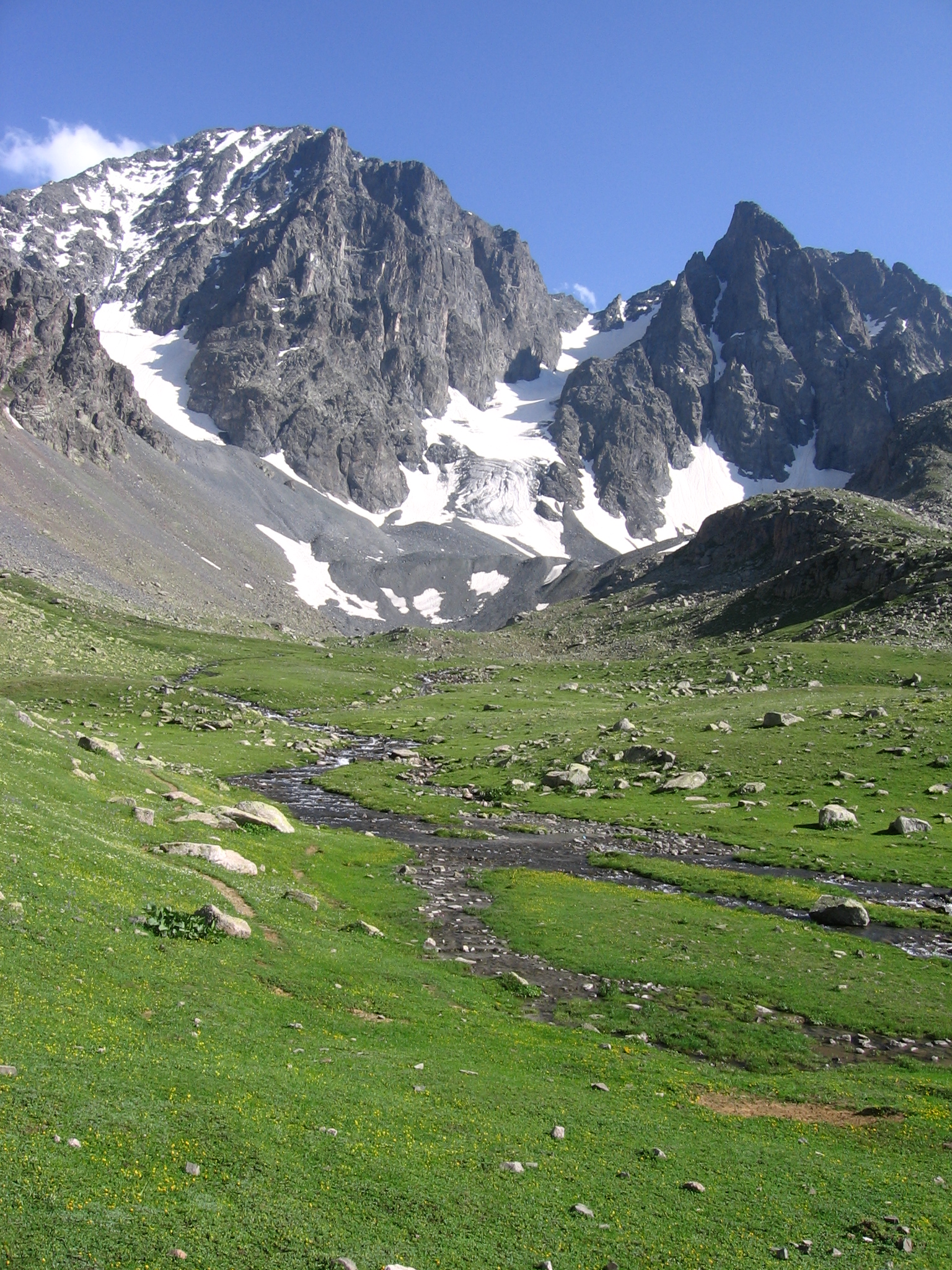
- Mount Kaçkar from Mezovit Çayırı

Highest point
- Elevation: 3,937 m (12,917 ft)
- Prominence: 2,272 m (7,454 ft)
- Listing: Ultra
- Coordinates: 40°50′08″N 41°09′41″E

Geography
- Location within Turkey
- Location: Rize, Turkey
- Parent range: Kaçkar mountains Pontic Mountains

Mount Kaçkar (Turkish: Kaçkar Dağı), with an elevation of 3,937 meters, is the highest peak in the Kaçkar Mountains. The mountain may be climbed by the northeast ridge route beginning from the village Yukarı Kavrun.

== Geography and etymology ==
The name Kaçkar (from Armenian khachkar (Խաչքար) literally meaning "cross stone") may be used in various senses. It may describe the whole mountain range, including the many mountain groups, or it may just describe the Kaçkar-Kavron group with its highest peak, or just the highest peak itself.

Mount Kaçkar is about 40 km from the Black Sea Coast and 70 km from the eastern border with Georgia and the port city Batumi there. The Turkish coastal cities Rize and Trabzon are about 70 and 120 km west of the mountain.

The surrounding mountain ranges are about 400 km long and represent the eastern third of the Pontic Mountains. This extends about 1000 km along the Black Sea and with its numerous parallel chains, which reach up to 200 km inland, belongs to the Alpine orogeny, i.e., developed at the same time as the Alps.

The closest three-thousanders are

- the Kükürt Tepe (3348 m), about 35 km north-northeast (halfway to Batumi)
- the Demirkapı Tepe (3376 m), about 70 km to the west.
- the Üçdoruk Tepe (3711 m), about 15 km to the west.

To the south runs the valley of the Çoruh, which flows into the Black Sea at Batumi.

== See also ==
- List of ultras of West Asia
