= Deniz Gölü =

Lake in Turkey

- Deniz Gölü (Turkish)
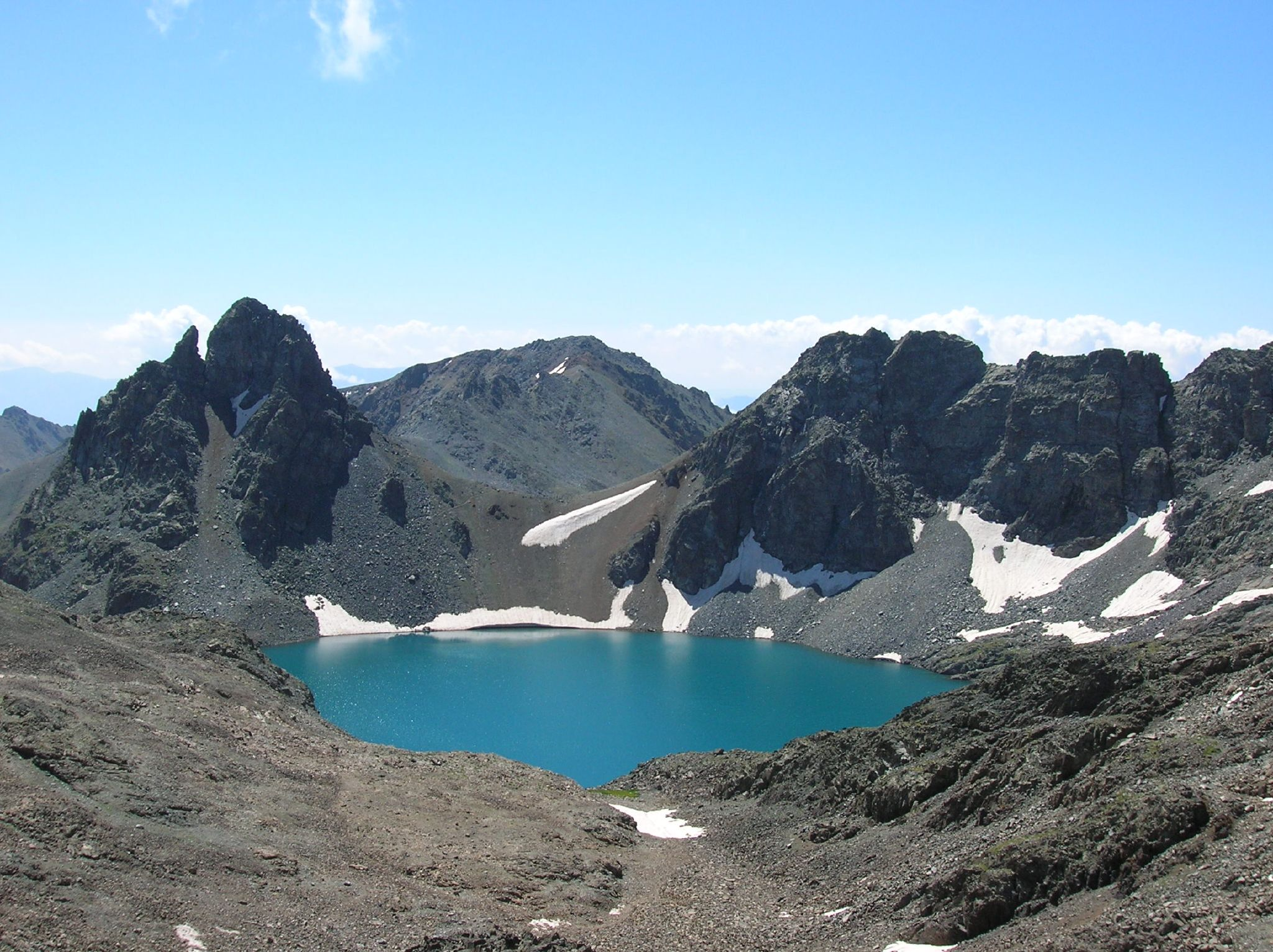
- Büyük Deniz Gölü

- Location within Turkey
- Location: Artvin Province
- Coordinates: 40°49′4″N 41°9′38″E
- Type: Glacial lake
- Basin countries: Turkey

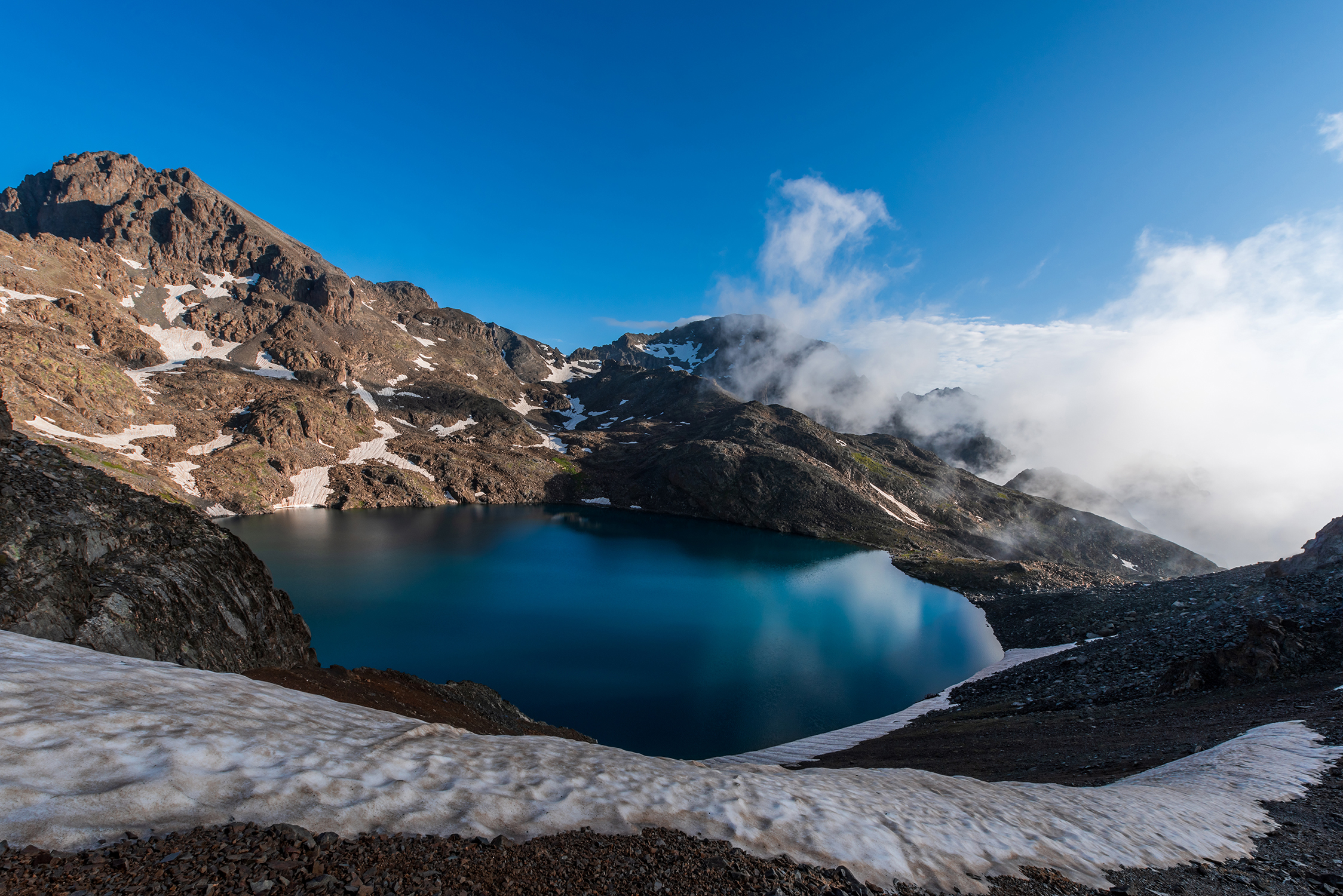
Big Sea Lake, a glacial lake near Kaçkar peak

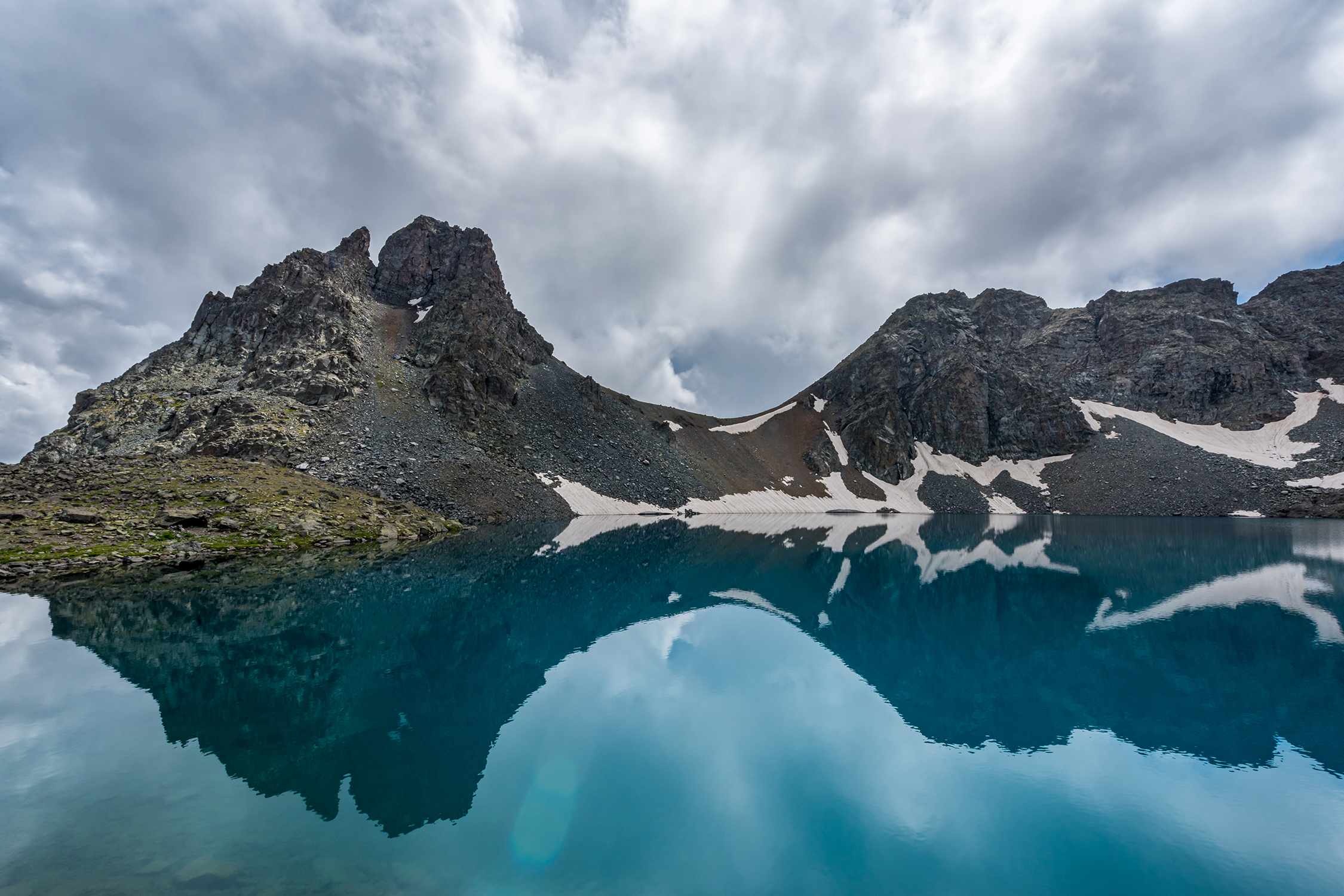
Big Sea lake-View from north

Büyük Deniz Gölü or Lake Big Peshevit (English: Big Sea Lake), is a glacial lake in Yusufeli district of Artvin Province in Turkey.

== Description ==
Büyük Deniz Gölü ("Big Sea Lake" in Eng.) is the deepest glacial lake in Turkey with depth of 60 m (200 ft) at an altitude of 3,384 m (11,102 ft). Also, it is the largest lake in terms of surface area in the Kaçkar Mountains with 95500 m^{2} (23 acres). There is one walking route to the lake from Yaylalar village of Yusufeli. It takes between 5 and 6 hours to reach to the Büyük Deniz Gölü.
