= Kireçlik, Arhavi =

Kireçlik
- Village
- Location within Turkey
- Coordinates: 41.3028°N 41.3178°E
- Country: Turkey
- Province: Artvin
- District: Arhavi
- Population (2021): 123
- Time zone: UTC+3 (TRT)

Kireçlik (Laz language: Baxta) is a village in the Arhavi District, Artvin Province, Turkey. Its population is 123 (2021).
