= Şenköy, Arhavi =

Şenköy
- Village
- Location within Turkey
- Coordinates: 41.3183°N 41.3439°E
- Country: Turkey
- Province: Artvin
- District: Arhavi
- Population (2021): 25
- Time zone: UTC+3 (TRT)

Şenköy (old name: Kutunet-i Süfla (قوطونت سفلا)) is a village in the Arhavi District, Artvin Province, Turkey. Its population is 25 (2021).
