= Soğucak, Arhavi =

Soğucak
- Village
- Location within Turkey
- Coordinates: 41.2847°N 41.4491°E
- Country: Turkey
- Province: Artvin
- District: Arhavi
- Population (2021): 94
- Time zone: UTC+3 (TRT)

Soğucak (Laz language: Potocuri) is a village in the Arhavi District, Artvin Province, Turkey. Its population is 94 (2021).
