= Kavak, Arhavi =

Kavak Yak'oviti
- Village
- Location within Turkey
- Coordinates: 41.3145°N 41.3044°E
- Country: Turkey
- Province: Artvin
- District: Arhavi
- Population (2021): 421
- Time zone: UTC+3 (TRT)

Kavak (also: Kavakköy, Laz language: Yak'oviti) is a village in the Arhavi District, Artvin Province, Turkey. Its population is 421 (2021).
