= Ortacalar, Arhavi =

Ortacalar Ç'arnavat'i
- Village
- Location within Turkey
- Coordinates: 41°16′45″N 41°22′45″E
- Country: Turkey
- Province: Artvin
- District: Arhavi
- Population (2021): 92
- Time zone: UTC+3 (TRT)

Ortacalar (also: Ortaköy, Laz language: Ç'arnavat'i) is a village in the Arhavi District, Artvin Province, Turkey. Its population is 92 (2021).
