= Tepeyurt, Arhavi =

Tepeyurt
- Village
- Location within Turkey
- Coordinates: 41.3269°N 41.3492°E
- Country: Turkey
- Province: Artvin
- District: Arhavi
- Population (2021): 129
- Time zone: UTC+3 (TRT)

Tepeyurt (old name: Kutunet-i Ulya (قوطونت علیا)) is a village in the Arhavi District, Artvin Province, Turkey. Its population is 129 (2021).
