= Arhavi =

Arhavi არქაბი / Arǩabi (Laz)
- Municipality
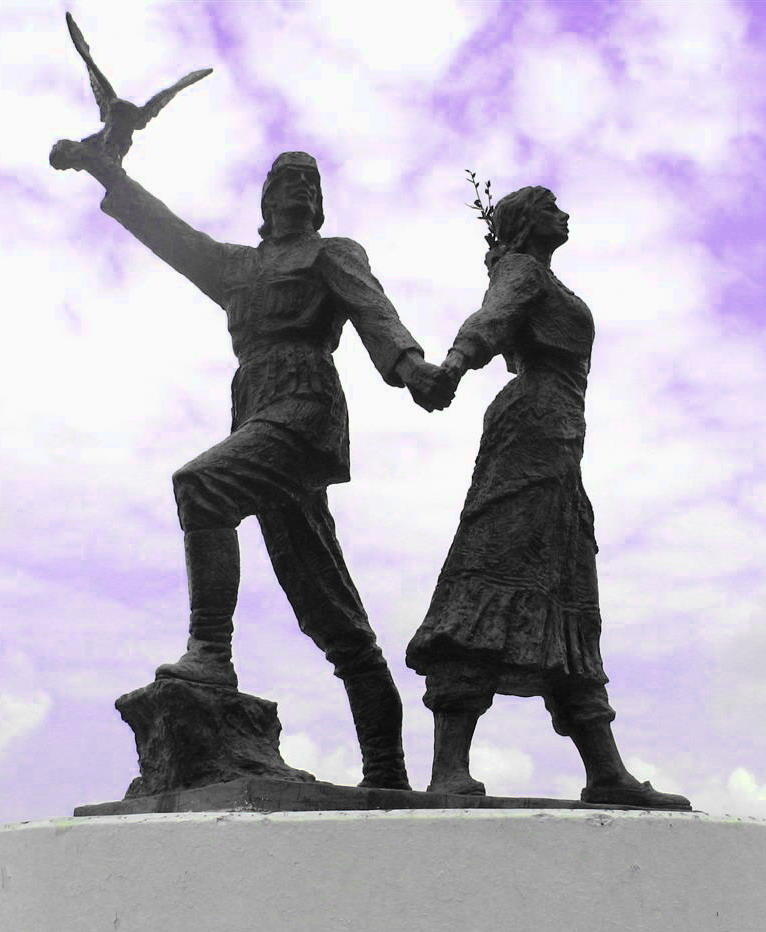
- Statue of a Laz man and woman in Arhavi (Arǩabi)

- Location within Turkey
- Coordinates: 41°20′N 41°18′E
- Country: Turkey
- Province: Artvin
- District: Arhavi

Government
  - Mayor: Turgay Ataselim (AKP)
- Elevation: 19 m (62 ft)
- Population (2022): 17,558
- Time zone: UTC+3 (TRT)
- Postal code: 08200
- Area code: 0466
- Climate: Cfa
- Website: www.arhavi.bel.tr

Arhavi (Laz: არქაბი/Arǩabi; Georgian: არქაბი/Arkabi) is a town in Artvin Province located in the Black Sea Region of Turkey. It is the seat of Arhavi District. Its population is 17,558 (2022), making it the third most populous municipality in Artvin Province. Laz people form a large portion of the population. The terrain is hilly and mountainous. Area of the city center is about 6 km^{2} (2.3 sq mi). The length of the coast is about 10 km (6.2 mi). Arhavi is famous by the Culture and Art Festival that celebrated since 1973.

== Etymology ==
Arhavi is "Arkabi" in Laz means "Old Viçe" or "Old village" Georgian: არქაბი and was formerly known as its river "Kapisre".

== History ==
=== The Ottoman Period ===
Arhavi was conquered by the Ottoman Empire in 1486.

During the First World War, in which the Ottoman Empire was an ally of Germany and Austria-Hungary, the Russian army occupied Arhavi on 14 January 1916.

== Geography ==
Arhavi Black Sea Region is located in the eastern Black Sea. It is bordered by the Black Sea in the North, the city lies west of Hopa and east of the Yusufeli border. The South is surrounded by hazelnut forests.

A typical Black Sea climate prevails in the district, characterized by warm summers and cool winters. In every season rainfall is common. The humid and mild climate is suitable for the cultivation of tea, nuts, corn and citrus.

The people of Arhavi are mainly Laz and the district attracts visitors from neighbouring Georgia.

=== Quarters ===
The town Arhavi consists of 7 quarters: Aşağı Hacılar, Cumhuriyet, Kale, Musazade, Yemişlik, Yukarı Hacılar and Boğaziçi.

== Population ==
Historical population
Year	Pop.	±% p.a.
1980	6,801	—
1985	9,079	+5.95%
1990	10,048	+2.05%
1997	13,392	+4.19%
2007	16,101	+1.86%
2012	15,973	−0.16%
2017	16,698	+0.89%
2022	17,558	+1.01%
Source: Population censuses (1980-1997) and TÜIK (2007-2022)

== Government ==
Elected mayors and political parties by year:

2024 - Turgay Ataselim AKP
2019 - Vasfi Kurdoğlu CHP
2014 - Coşkun Hekimoğlu AKP
2009 - Coşkun Hekimoğlu AKP
2004 - Musa Ulutaş CHP
1999 - Vasfi Kurdoğlu ANAP
1994 - Vasfi Kurdoğlu DYP
1989 - Mehmet Çorbacıoğlu SHP
1984 - İ.Fethi Özkazanç SODEP
1977 - Kazım Kurdoğlu AP
1973 - AP
1968 - Rüştü Hatinoğlu AP
1963 - CHP

== Culture and art ==
=== Arhavi Culture & Arts Festival ===
The Arhavi Kültür ve Sanat Festivali is an annual festival which first took place in Arhavi in 1973. The festival which runs for three days is usually held in August. During the festival, popular musicians from all over Turkey perform daily. A regular guest singer is the very famous Arhavi native Cengiz Kurtoğlu. Along with the many singers who perform, the local folk dance "Horon" is performed by professional dancers and local school children.

== Well-known citizens ==
=== Arhavili Ismail ===
"Arhavili Ismail" is a poem about the Turkish War of Independence by Nazim Hikmet, it has been recorded by Zulfu Livaneli, music star born into an Artvin family, and by local musician Volkan Konak.
