= Pontic Mountains =

Mountain range in northern Anatolia, Turkey

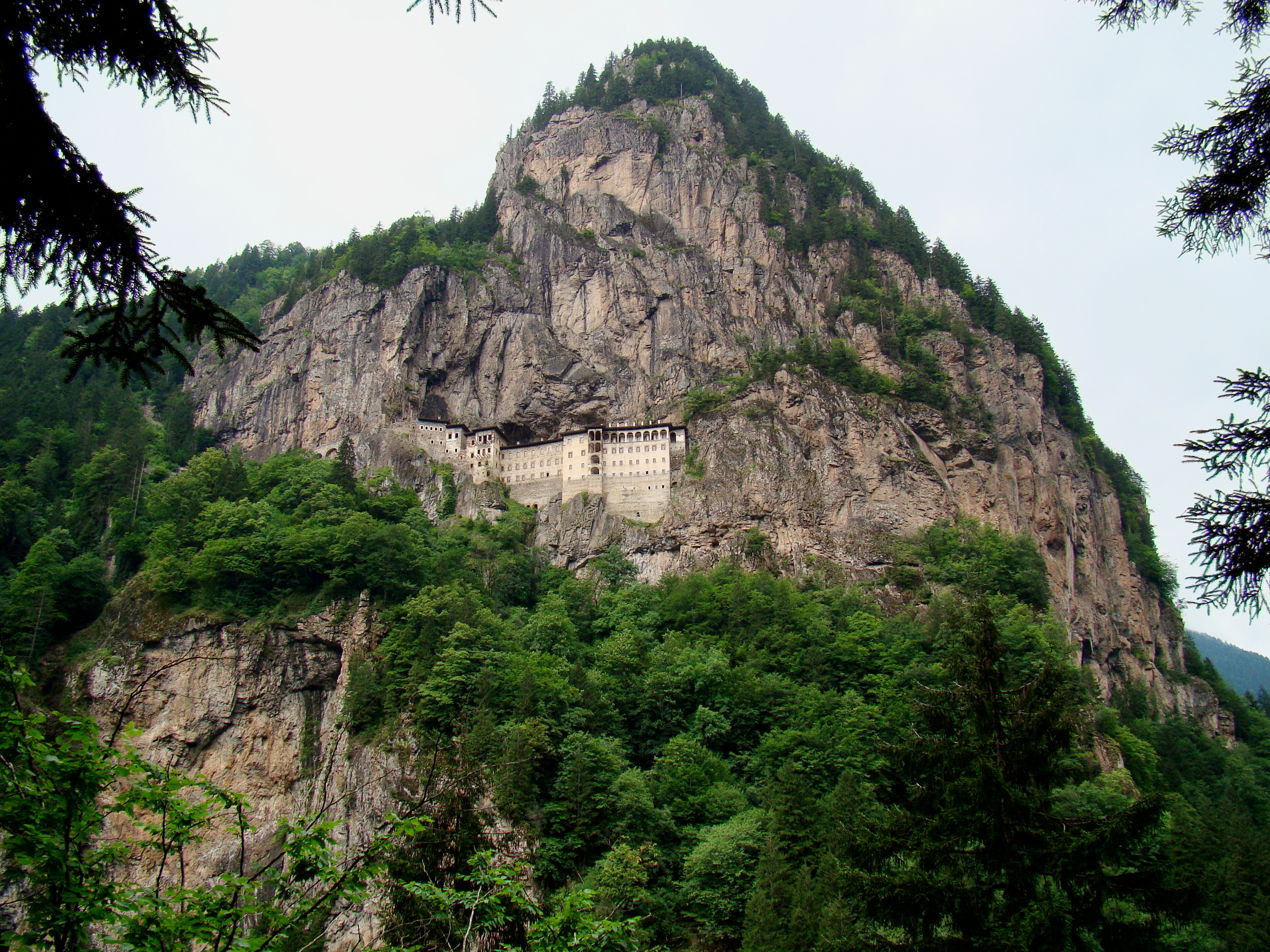
- Sumela Monastery on the Pontic Mountains

Highest point
- Peak: Mt. Kaçkar
- Elevation: 3,937 m (12,917 ft)
- Coordinates: 40°50′N 41°09′E

Dimensions
- Length: 1,000 km (620 mi)

Geography
- Countries: Turkey and Georgia
- Range coordinates: 40°30′N 40°30′E

The Pontic Mountains, Pontic Alps or Parhar Mountains (Note: Greek: Ποντιακές Άλπεις Póntos Halpeis , Pontic Greek: Ποντιακά Παρχάραι Póntos Parkhárai or Πόντος Όρη Póntos Óri; Turkish: Kuzey Anadolu Dağları, meaning 'North Anatolian Mountains') form a mountain range stretching along the southern Pontic coast of the Black Sea (once known as the "Euxine Sea") in northern Anatolia, Turkey.

In ancient Roman times, the mountains were called the Paryadres or Parihedri Mountains.

== Etymology ==
The name of the mountains is derived from the Greek word Πόντος Póntos, which means 'sea'.

The term Parhar originates from a Hittite word meaning 'high' or 'summit'.

== Geography ==
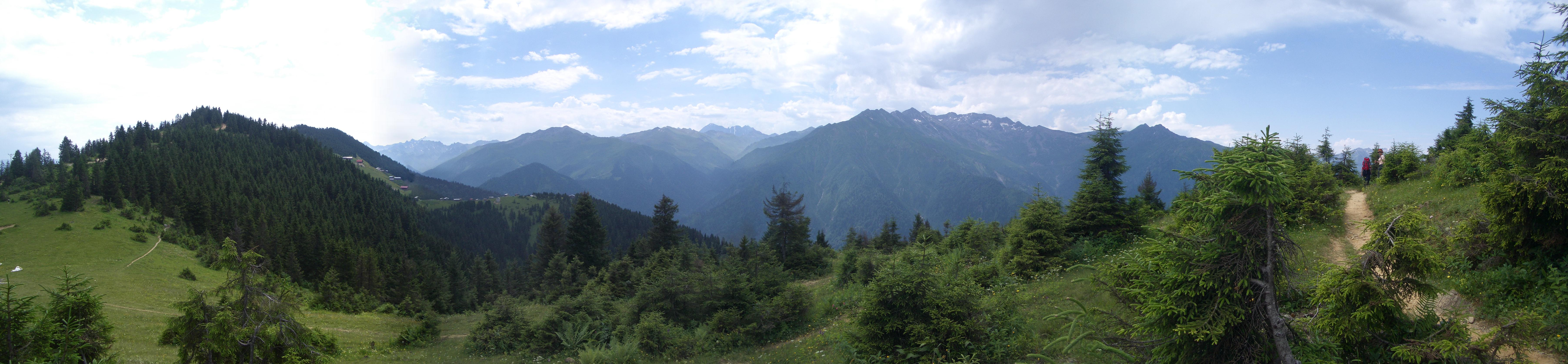
A panorama of the Pontic Mountains in Turkey

The range runs roughly east–west, parallel and close to the southern coast of the Black Sea. It extends northeast into Georgia, and west into the Sea of Marmara, with the northwestern spur of the Küre Mountains (and their western extension the Akçakoca Mountains) and the Bolu Mountains, following the coast. The highest peak in the range is Kaçkar Dağı, which rises to 3,937 m (12,917 ft). The North Anatolian Fault and the Northeast Anatolian Fault, which are east–west-running strike-slip faults, run along the length of the range.

== Ecology ==
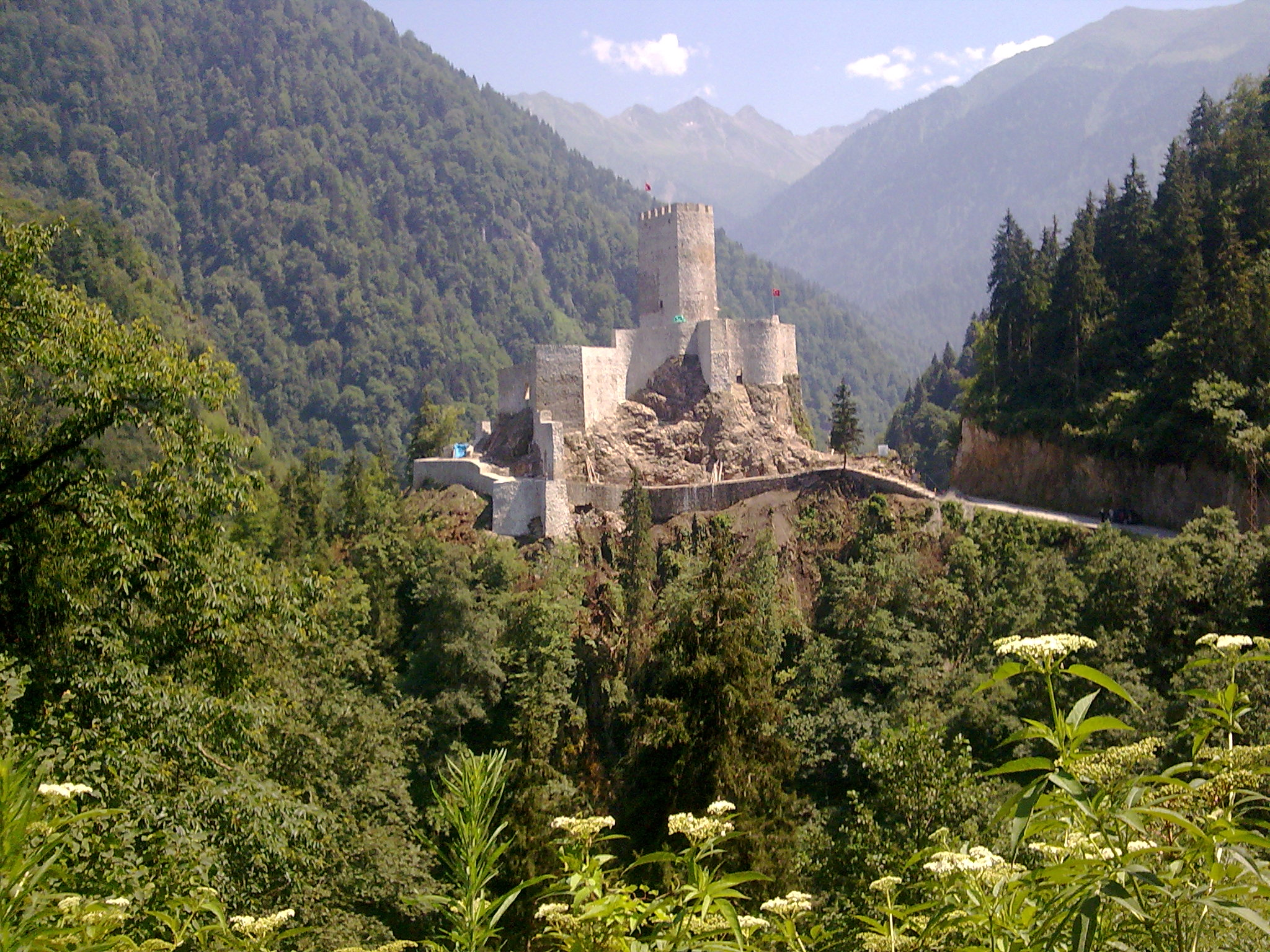
Zilkale Castle

The mountains are generally covered by dense forests, predominantly of conifers. Archaeological findings of pine pollen deposits in lake beds indicated a wide spread of pine forests across the mountains from 15th century BCE after a period of human settlement and agricultural activity to around 8th-9th centuries CE.

The Northern Anatolian conifer and deciduous forests is an ecoregion which covers most of the range, while the Caucasus mixed forests extend across the far-eastern end of the range, known as the Kaçkar Mountains. The narrow coastal strip between the mountains and the Black Sea, known as Pontus, is home to the Euxine-Colchic deciduous forests, which contain some of the world's few temperate rainforests.

The region is home to Eurasian wildlife such as the Eurasian sparrowhawk, golden eagle, eastern imperial eagle, lesser spotted eagle, Caucasian black grouse, red-fronted serin, and wallcreeper.

Winter conditions are very harsh, and snow even in summer months isn't unusual above certain elevations.

The Anatolian Plateau, which lies south of the range, has a considerably drier and more continental climate than the humid and mild coast, owing to the mountains' rain shadow effect.
