= Kapisre Creek =

Water stream in Artvin province, Turkey

Coordinates: 41°21′07″N 41°17′48″E

Kapisre Creek is the main water stream of Arhavi in the eastern Black Sea Region of Turkey. On July 22, 2021 heavy rain caused the water levels on the creek to rise, causing significant flooding in Arhavi.

== Description ==
The Kapisre Creek is 35 kilometres (22 mi) long. The creek is notable for rafting activities.
