= Derecik, Arhavi =

Derecik
- Village
- Location within Turkey
- Country: Turkey
- Province: Artvin
- District: Arhavi
- Population (2021): 106
- Time zone: UTC+3 (TRT)

Derecik (Laz language: Gidreve) is a village in the Arhavi District, Artvin Province, Turkey. Its population is 106 (2021).
