= Yolgeçen, Arhavi =

Yolgeçen
- Village
- Location within Turkey
- Coordinates: 41.2986°N 41.2899°E
- Country: Turkey
- Province: Artvin
- District: Arhavi
- Elevation: 200 m (660 ft)
- Population (2021): 387
- Time zone: UTC+3 (TRT)
- Postal code: 08200
- Area code: 0466

Yolgeçen (Laz language: Lome) is a village in the Arhavi District, Artvin Province, Turkey. Its population is 387 (2021).
