= Ulukent, Arhavi =

Ulukent
- Village
- Location within Turkey
- Coordinates: 41.3228°N 41.3922°E
- Country: Turkey
- Province: Artvin
- District: Arhavi
- Population (2021): 169
- Time zone: UTC+3 (TRT)

Ulukent (Laz language: Pilargeti (ფილარგეთი)) is a village in the Arhavi District, Artvin Province, Turkey. Its population is 169 (2021).
