= Yıldızlı, Arhavi =

Yıldızlı
- Village
- Location within Turkey
- Coordinates: 41.2733°N 41.4111°E
- Country: Turkey
- Province: Artvin
- District: Arhavi
- Population (2021): 51
- Time zone: UTC+3 (TRT)

Yıldızlı (Laz language: Nobağleni) is a village in the Arhavi District, Artvin Province, Turkey. Its population is 51 (2021).
