= Dikyamaç, Arhavi =

Dikyamaç
- Village
- Location within Turkey
- Coordinates: 41.2891°N 41.3709°E
- Country: Turkey
- Province: Artvin
- District: Arhavi
- Population (2021): 76
- Time zone: UTC+3 (TRT)

Dikyamaç (Laz language: Kamparona; კამპარონა) is a village in the Arhavi District, Artvin Province, Turkey. Its population is 76 (2021).
