= Arhavi District =

District of Artvin Province, Turkey

- District
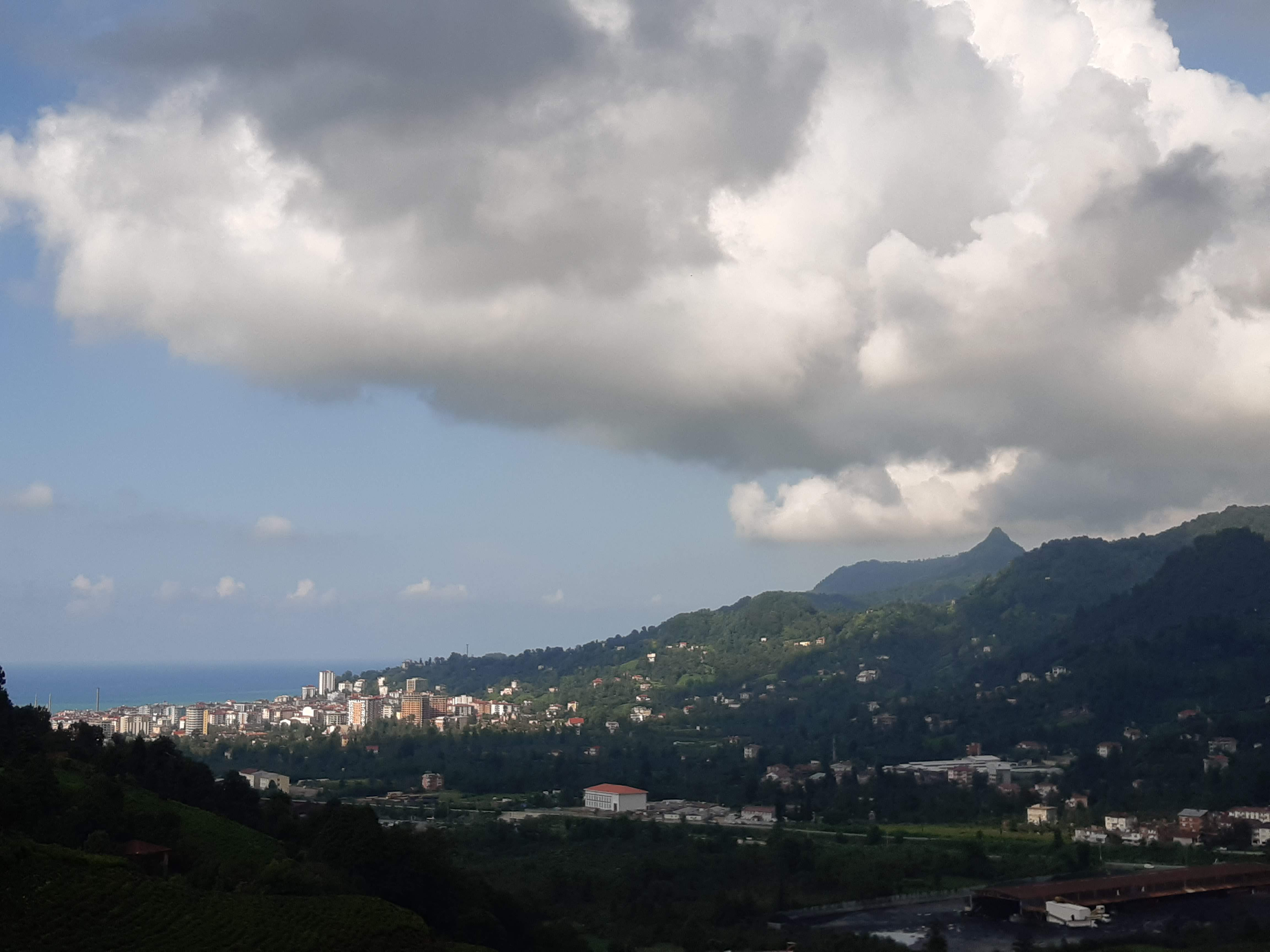
- Arhavi landscape

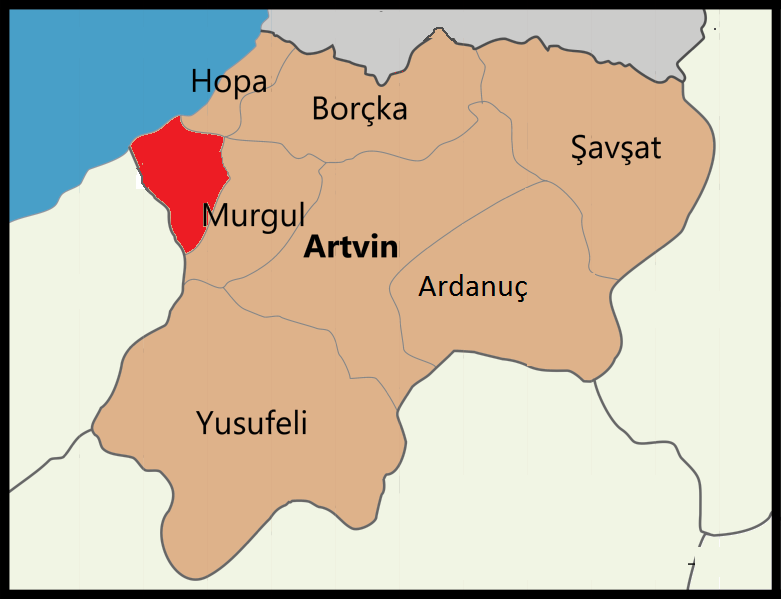
- Map showing Arhavi District in Artvin Province

- Location within Turkey
- Coordinates: 41°20′N 41°18′E
- Country: Turkey
- Province: Artvin
- Seat: Arhavi

Government
  - Kaymakam: Burak Çimşir
- Area: 407 km^{2} (157 sq mi)
- Population (2022): 21,520
  - Density: 52.9/km^{2} (137/sq mi)
- Time zone: UTC+3 (TRT)
- Website: www.arhavi.gov.tr

Arhavi District is a district of Artvin Province of Turkey. Its seat is the town Arhavi. Its area is 407 km^{2}, and its population is 21,520 (2022).

== Composition ==
There is one municipality in Arhavi District:

- Arhavi

There are 30 villages in Arhavi District:

- Arılı
- Aşağışahinler
- Balıklı
- Başköy
- Boyuncuk
- Derecik
- Dereüstü
- Dikyamaç
- Dülgerli
- Güneşli
- Güngören
- Gürgencik
- Kavak
- Kemerköprü
- Kestanealan
- Kireçlik
- Konaklı
- Küçükköy
- Ortacalar
- Şenköy
- Sırtoba
- Soğucak
- Tepeyurt
- Üçırmak
- Üçler
- Ulaş
- Ulukent
- Yıldızlı
- Yolgeçen
- Yukarışahinler

== Population ==
The literacy rate in the district in 2009 was 96%.

Historical population
Year	Pop.	±% p.a.
1980	17,772	—
1985	19,016	+1.36%
1990	18,351	−0.71%
1997	17,635	−0.57%
2007	19,163	+0.83%
2012	19,602	+0.45%
2017	20,452	+0.85%
2022	21,520	+1.02%
Source: Population censuses (1980-1997) and TÜIK (2007-2022)

== Natural attractions ==
Mençuna Waterfall in the Kamilet Valley, autumn

Mençuna Waterfall, about 92 m (302 ft) high, is in the Kamilet Valley of the district. The road to the waterfall passes the historic stone arch bridges known as the Double Bridge (Çifte Köprü).
