= Battle of Surmalu =

1920 Turkish–Armenian War battle

- Part of the Turkish–Armenian War
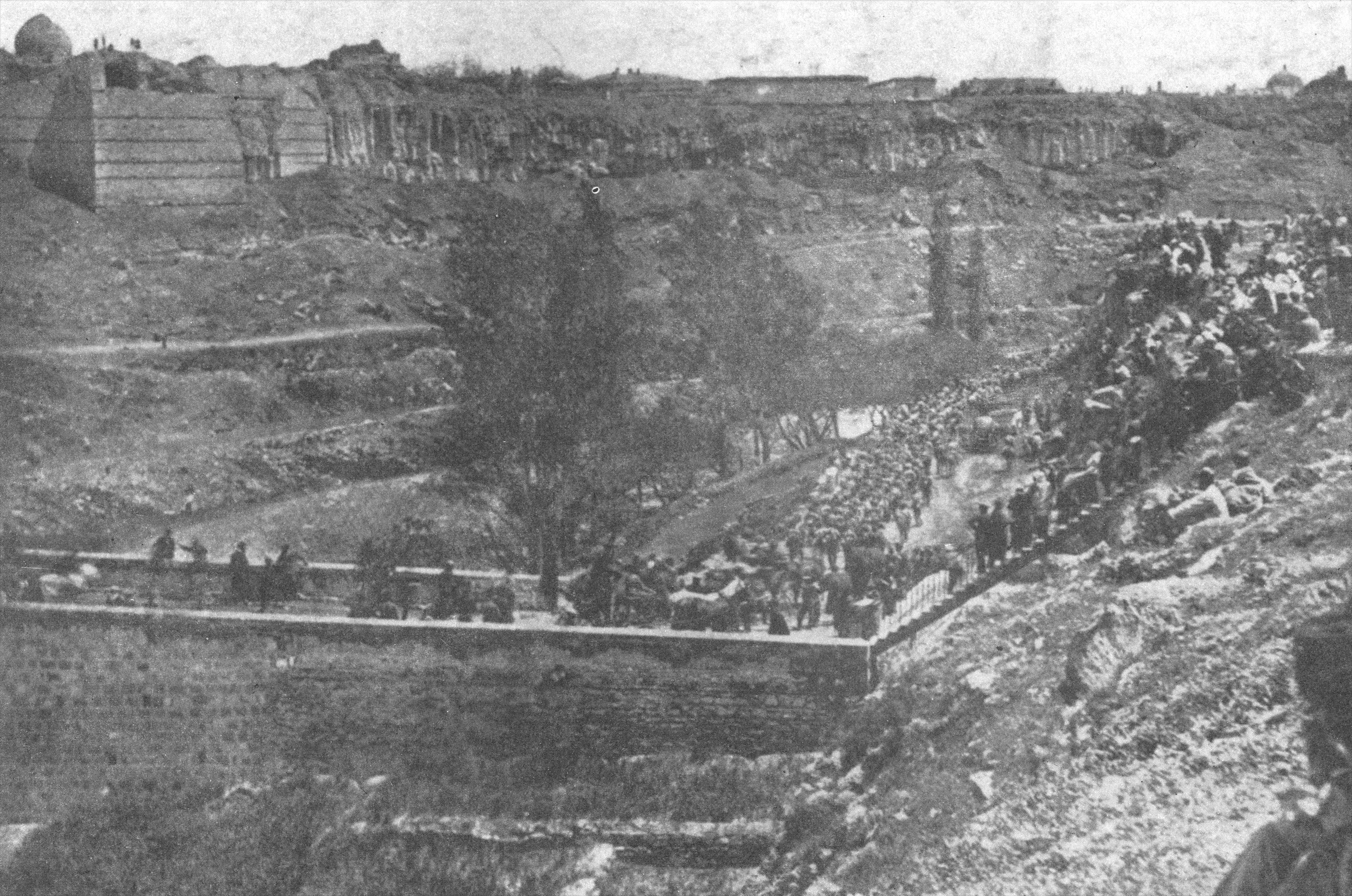
- Armenian soldiers in the Ararat regiment.
Date	October 24–26, 1920
Location	Surmalu, Armenia (present-day Iğdır, Turkey)
Result	Armenian victory
Territorial changes	Turkish forces retreat to the slopes of Ararat

Belligerents
(First Republic of Armenia) Armenia	(Ottoman Empire) Ankara Government: Kurdish volunteers

Commanders and leaders
Drastamat Kanayan; Col. Kuro Tarkhanian; Col. Khudabashian; Lt. Col. Halberian	Kâzım Karabekir; Cavid Bey

Units involved
9th Infantry Regiment; 10th Infantry Regiment	11th Caucasus Division; 34th Regiment

Strength
3,000 regulars and 1,000 civilians	Unknown

Casualties and losses
130+ killed: In certain areas, fifty percent of Tarkhanian's soldier's were "killed or maimed"	Heavy

The Battle of Surmalu was a battle in the Turkish invasion of Armenia, lasting from October 24–30, 1920. The sides involved were the First Republic of Armenia, which was commanded by Drastamat Kanayan, and the Grand National Assembly of Turkey with Kurdish volunteers.

== Background ==
The Turks had launched an offensive into the Oltu district, pushing the poorly-equipped Armenian forces backward; Sarikamish was captured without much of a fight. The only fronts after that were the Surmalu (Iğdır) front, and the line of defense at Kars. The First Republic of Armenia had appointed Drastamat Kanayan to be in main command of the defense of the front.

== First Turkish offensive ==
On October 24, a significant Turkish attack on Surmalu began before dawn, with the 34th Regiment targeting Iğdır, the district seat, as well as the Markara and Karakala bridges that connect Yerevan and Etchmiadzin. Operations were carried out simultaneously in Kiulluk-Charukhchi, Sultanabad-Igdir, and Dashburun-Karakoy. Despite Kanayan's expedition defeating attacks from Sultanabad and Orgov, the struggle for the Araxes bridges lasted three days.

== Second Turkish offensive ==
On the second day, Armenian armored vehicles from Kanaker joined the group of Kuro Tarkhanian, breaching Turkish isolation in Igdir despite heavy machine-gun fire. Colonel Tarkhanian lost half of his 260 soldiers in harsh close-combat near Dalikdash before Turkish forces left on October 26. Meanwhile, the Turkish 11th Caucasus Division attacked the Karakala bridge but was unable to dislodge the defenders. They burned the bridge before fleeing.

Colonel Khudabashian, distinguished himself in these battles, driving the Turks and Kurds toward Kulp, up the slopes of Mount Ararat, and into the Bartoghi Mountains along the old Russo–Turkish frontier with the assistance of Colonel Tarkhanian's men and Lieutenant Colonel Halberian's newly formed 10th Infantry Regiment. Kanayan's invading army established bases from the Karakala bridge to Verin and Nerkin Charukhchi, Yaidji, Khoshkhabar, the Igdir-Khalfalu road, Sultanabad, Mount Gasimtach, Dalikdash, Karakoyunlu, Dashburun, and Diza, constituting the battle.

== Aftermath ==
With the loyalty of the Armenian soldiers to their officers, the Armenians had a victory at Surmalu. Although the Armenians would abandon their positions at Surmalu later on due to the Turkish capture of Kars, the two-day battle denied the Turks entry into the Surmalu region temporarily.

== See also ==
- Battle of Kars (1920)
- Turkish invasion of Armenia
