= Battle of Alexandropol =

Battle during the Turkish-Armenian War

- Part of Turkish–Armenian War
Date	November 7, 1920
Location	Alexandropol (today Gyumri, Armenia)
Result	Turkish victory: Treaty of Alexandropol

Belligerents
Armenia	Ankara Government

Commanders and leaders
Unknown	Kâzım Karabekir

The Battle of Alexandropol was a conflict between the First Republic of Armenia and the Turkish National Movement which was on November 7, 1920, at Alexandropol.

== Background ==
The Turkish invasion of Armenia, also known as the Turkish–Armenian War and known in Turkey as the Eastern Front (Turkish: Doğu cephesi) of the Turkish War of Independence, was a conflict fought between the recently established First Republic of Armenia and the Turkish National Movement, following the signing of the Treaty of Sèvres in 1920. The treaty transferred vast portions of eastern Anatolia from the Ottoman Empire to Armenia, including the towns of Trabzon, Erzurum and Van. While delegates of the Ottoman government reluctantly signed the treaty following their defeat in World War I, members of the Ottoman parliament refused to ratify it. The treaty greatly angered the Turkish Nationalists, led by Mustafa Kemal Pasha, who refused to recognize it. In September 1920, remnants of the Ottoman Army's XV Corps under the command of Kâzım Karabekir, attacked Western Armenia with orders from the Ankara Government to "eliminate Armenia physically and politically".

One estimate places the number of Armenians massacred by the Turkish army during the invasion at 100,000—this is evident in the marked decline (−25.1%) of the population of modern-day Armenia from 961,677 in 1919 to 720,000 in 1920. The Turkish military victory was followed by the Soviet invasion of Armenia and the establishment of the Armenian Soviet Socialist Republic. The Turkish invasion and occupation had drastic humanitarian impacts to Armenia's population, triggering condemnation from German and American officials. According to several historians, only Soviet intervention prevented the completion of the Armenian genocide.

The hostilities ended with the Treaty of Alexandropol and the effective partition of Armenia between Kemalist Turkey and the Soviet Union: most of Western Armenia was transferred to Turkey and Eastern Armenia was incorporated into the Soviet Union as the Armenian Socialist Republic. This status was solidified by the annulment of the Treaty of Sèvres, and the ratification of the Treaty of Moscow (March 1921) and Treaty of Kars (October 1921) between Soviet Russia and the Grand National Assembly of Turkey.

== Active Stage ==
On October 24, Karabekir's forces launched a massive campaign on Kars. Rather than fighting for the city, the Armenians abandoned Kars which by October 30 came under full Turkish control. Alexandropol was occupied by Turkish troops on November 7. Treaty of Kars.

== Results ==
The Treaty of Alexandropol was a peace treaty between the Democratic Republic of Armenia and TBMM ending the Turkish-Armenian War, before declaration of the Republic of Turkey on December 2, 1920. Armenian was forced to renounce the Treaty of Sèvres and cede over 50% of her claimed territory to Turkey.
