= Giorgi Mazniashvili =

Georgian general (1871–1937)

- გიორგი მაზნიაშვილი
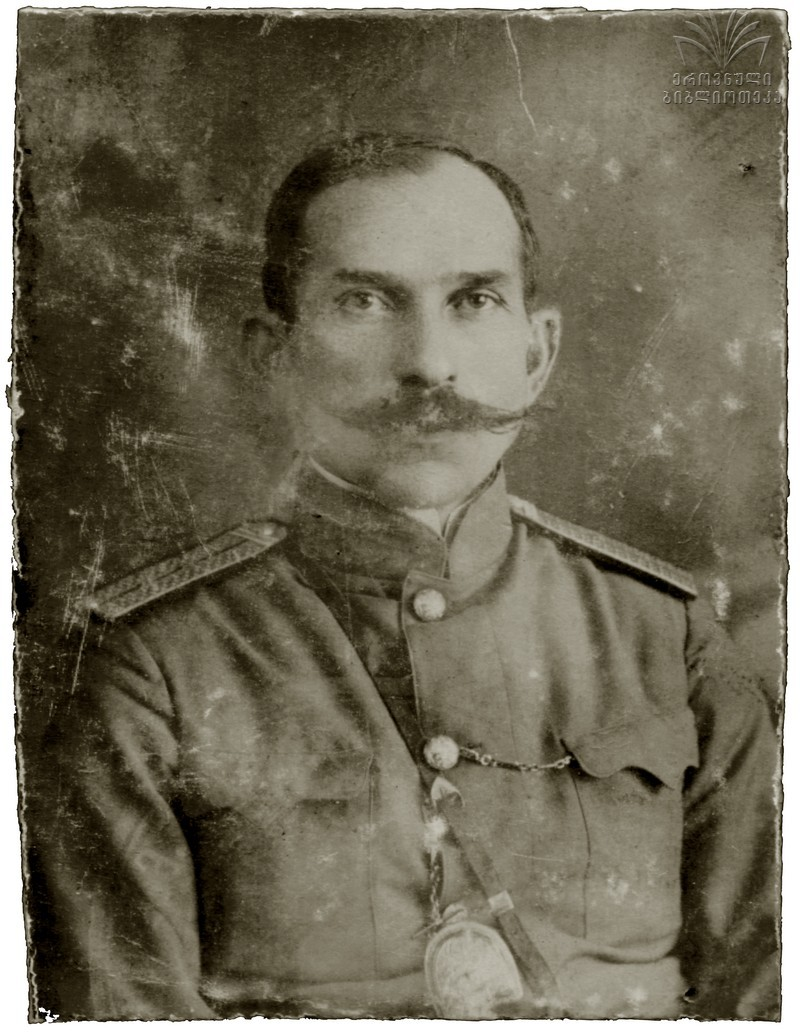
- General Mazniashvili
- Born: 6 April 1871; Sasiresti, Tiflis, Russia (now Sasiresti, Georgia)
- Died: 9 September 1937 (aged 66)
- Military career
- Allegiance: Russian Empire (1905–1917); Democratic Republic of Georgia (1918–1921); Soviet Union (1921)
- Service years: 1905–1923
- Rank: Captain & Colonel (Russia); General (Georgia); Divisional general (Red Army)
- Conflicts: Russo-Japanese War; World War I; Eastern Front (World War I); Caucasus campaign; Battle of Choloki; Abkhazia conflict (1918); Russian Civil War; Sochi conflict; First Battle of Sochi (1918); Battle of Tuaspe; Battle of Loo; Taman Army March; Armeno-Georgian War; Shulaveri Operation; Soviet invasion of Georgia; Battle of Kojori-Tabakhmela; Turkish invasion of Georgia; Battle of Batumi

Giorgi Ivanes dze Mazniashvili (Georgian: გიორგი ივანეს ძე მაზნიაშვილი) (6 April 1871 – 9 September 1937) was a Georgian general and one of the most prominent military figures in the Democratic Republic of Georgia. He is recognized as the National Hero of Georgia.

== Early life and education ==
Mazniashvili was born on 6 April 1871 in the village Sasireti, Tiflis Governorate, Russian Empire (present day Kaspi Municipality, Shida Kartli, Georgia). Having taken a proper military education, he was later promoted to colonel of the Russian army.

== Career ==
Wounded in the Russo-Japanese War, he was visited at a hospital by the Tsar Nicholas II, who awarded him Saint George's Cross and invited to the palace. He fought also on the battlefields of World War I, but returned to Georgia after the February Revolution in 1917. He formed two national divisions and secured the capital Tbilisi from the chaotically retreating and increasingly Bolshevik Russian soldiers.

In April 1918, on the basis of the Treaty of Brest-Litovsk, the Turks occupied Batumi, from where, in violation of the agreements, they continued their offensive into the Georgian province of Guria, reaching Ozurgeti. On 8 April, Mazniashvili with the Georgian army counterattacked and defeated the Turks at the Battle of Choloki.

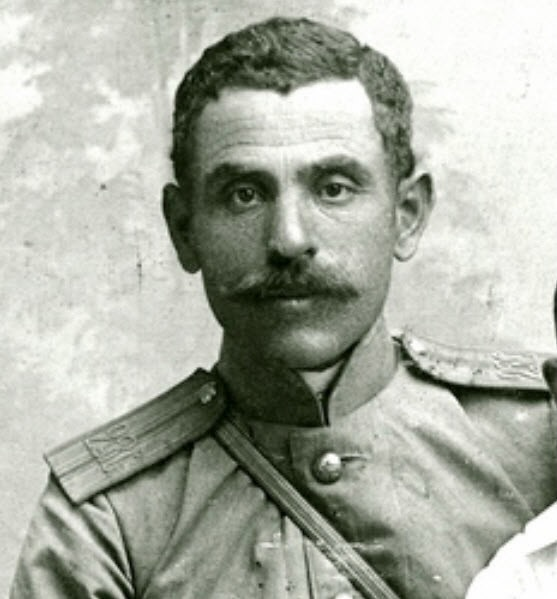
Mazniashvili earlier in his military career

In June 1918, he served as a governor general of Abkhazia and crushed there a pro-Bolshevik revolt; then he took Gagra, Sochi and Tuapse in the first phase of the Sochi conflict.

From October to December 1918, he served as a governor general of Tbilisi. During the December Georgian-Armenian war 1918, he was appointed a commander-in-chief and successfully defended the Georgian borders from the troops of General Dro and Stepan Shahumyan. In 1919 he served as a governor general of Akhaltsikhe and Akhalkalaki and was moved, on 6 October 1920, as a commandant in Tbilisi. During the Soviet invasion of February 1921, he repulsed the Red Army from the Soghanlughi heights at the outskirts of Tbilisi. The war, however, was lost. Mazniashvili did not follow the country's leaders in exile.

In 1921, the Bolsheviks approached Giorgi Mazniashvili, to retake Batumi. In a conversation, Bolshevik leader Sergo Ordzhonikidze told Mazniashvili to side with Bolsheviks or face repression as the Menshevik general. Giorgi Mazniashvili agreed by replying: "I am neither Menshevik nor Bolshevik general, I am general of Georgia". He organized a military force from the remnants of disorganized and disoriented Georgian army. Mazniashvili was supported by the Red Army division and the local communists. Russian troops were sent into the city, but they did not fight. On March 18–19, the Georgian units under the command of General Giorgi Mazniashvili fought at the Battle of Batumi against the Turkish soldiers commanded by Kâzım Karabekir and managed to defeat them. On March 20, the Turks left Batumi. After defeating Turks, Mazniashvili handed Batumi over to the Bolshevik regime of Georgia.

The newly established Soviet government of Georgia declared him outlaw, but later General Mazniashvili served in the Georgian Red Army and commanded a division. Soon, the division was disbanded due to the reduction of staff and Mazniashvili was appointed as an infantry inspector.

== Later life and death ==
In September 1921, he was arrested on charges of being a counter-revolutionary and he was convicted. In 1923, he was sentenced to be shot, but later the sentence was commuted to exiled to Persia whence he moved to France. In a few years, he was allowed to return and he lived in his native village Sasireti, far from political life. During the Great Purges, however, he was arrested and executed without a trial in 1937. In the 1950s, Mazniashvili's son, a World War II veteran of the Soviet army, submitted a request for a political rehabilitation of his father, but this was turned down by the authorities.

== Legacy ==
Mazniashvili is the author of the popular Soldier's Memoirs. In 2013, he was posthumously awarded the title and Order of the National Hero of Georgia.

== Personal life ==
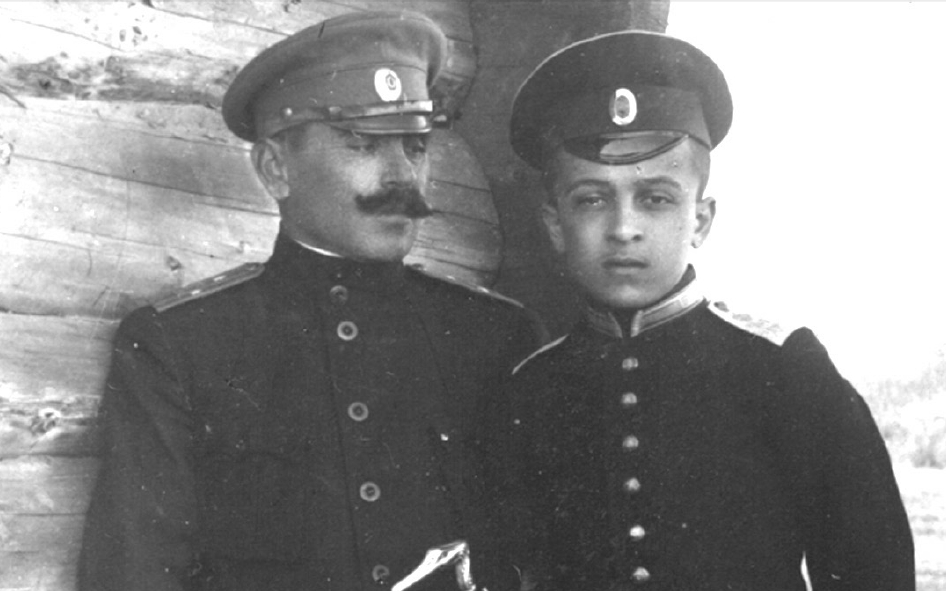
Giorgi Mazniashvili (left) with his son Ivane

=== Ancestry ===
According to historian Ucha Murghulia, Mazniashvili's father was Georgian officer of Russian Imperial Army Ivane Mazniashvili. However, according to other versions, attested by his stepchild's descendent Anouki Areshidze, Giorgi Mazniashvili's father was an ethnic Russian officer Ivan Maznev and his mother was an ethnic Georgian Kristine Glurjidze.

== Sources ==
- Debro, Richard (1992). Survival and Consolidation: The Foreign Policy of Soviet Russia, 1918–1921. McGill-Queen's Press. ISBN 978-0-7735-0828-6.
- Rayfield, Donald (2012). Edge of Empires: A History of Georgia (Kindle ed.). London: Reaktion Books. ISBN 978-1-78023-030-6.
- Gogitidze, Mamuka; Bezhitashvili, Giorgi (2015). Faithfuls to the military oath. Tʻbilisi: Shota Rustaveli National University. ISBN 978-9941-0-7386-1.
- Mikaberidze, Alexander (2015). Historical Dictionary of Georgia. Rowman & Littlefield Publishers. ISBN 978-1-4422-4146-6.
