= Battle of Batumi =

Battle in 1921

- Part of the Turkish invasion of Georgia
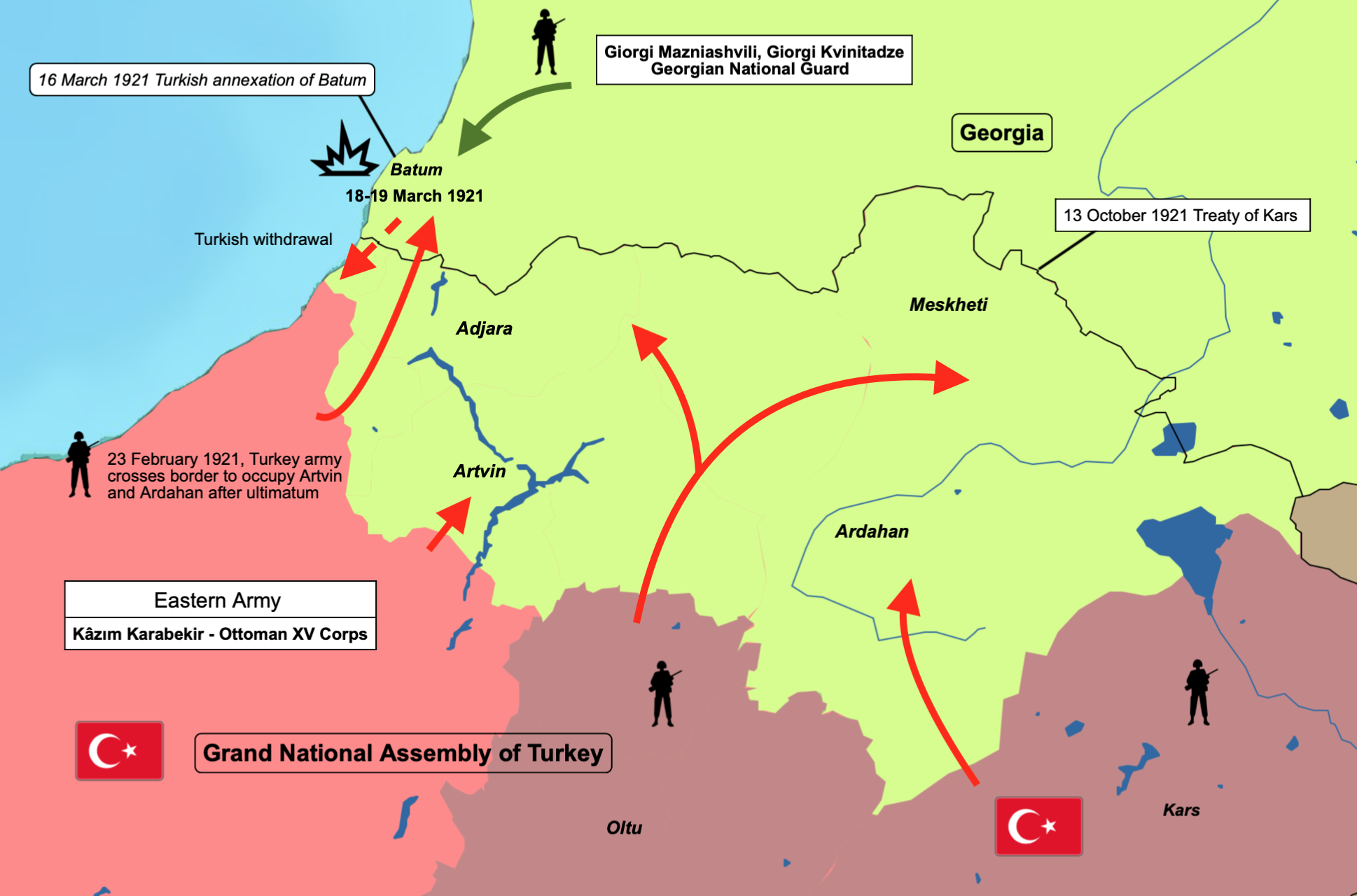
- Map of Turkish invasion of Georgia in 1921, and the battle of Batumi.
| Date | 18–20 March 1921 |
| Location | Batumi, Georgia |
| Result | Georgian victory |

Belligerents
| Ankara Government | (Georgia (country)) Democratic Republic of Georgia |

Commanders and leaders
| Kâzım Karabekir | (Georgia (country)) Giorgi Mazniashvili |

Strength
| 3,500 | (Georgia (country)) 3,000 |

Casualties and losses
| 30 killed 26 wounded 46 missing (Turkish sources, during the entire Georgian campaign); More than 200 killed (Georgian sources) | 84 killed |

The Battle of Batumi was a military battle between Democratic Republic of Georgia and Turkey during the Turkish invasion of Georgia. The Georgian aim of this battle was to remove the invading Turkish army from Batumi. The battle concluded with Georgian victory and ensured that Batumi remained part of the Georgian homeland, albeit under the newly established Georgian Soviet Socialist Republic.

== Background ==
On 15 February 1921, the Red Army launched a military operation to sovietize the Georgian Democratic Republic. The Georgian government engaged in a fight with the Soviet forces, offering stiff resistance to the Soviets but losing the capital Tbilisi and having to fall back first to Kutaisi, and then to Batumi. During this war, Turkey demanded the handover of Artvin and Ardahan Provinces from Georgia in an ultimatum. The Georgian government did not accept this ultimatum, although the mentioned cities were emptied, because it could not fight on two fronts, the Turkish army occupied the cities on February 23, which the Georgian government did not legally recognize. After capturing Artvin and Ardahan, the claims of the Turkish side seemed to have run out and they offered to help Georgia in the fight against the Red Army. This brought the Turkish army close to Batumi while the Bolsheviks themselves were approaching the city. Turks wanted to enter Batumi, and the Georgian Menshevik government was in no position to offer resistance. Georgian Mensheviks used the circumstances to prolong their governance. On 7 March, they reached the verbal agreement with the Turkish Colonel Kiazim Bey to allow his army into Batumi, while leaving the Menshevik government of Georgia in control of civil administration in the area.

On March 11, the leading units of the Turkish army entered Batumi. Their goal was to conquer the Batumi region, not to fight together with the Georgians against Bolshevik Russia, although this was a more adventurous step, because negotiations between Soviet Russia and Turkey were taking place in Moscow. Mensheviks were seeking to use Turkish protection while awaiting possible French intervention on their side. Mensheviks asked France to approach Turkey seeking the de jure recognition of Georgia. As France and the Great Britain were unwilling to intervene and the agreement with Turks collapsed, Georgia came under the threat of permanently losing Batumi. Understanding this, Mensheviks agreed to negotiate with the Bolsheviks to preserve Batumi within Georgia. Meanwhile, Turkey and Russia signed the Treaty of Moscow on March 16, 1921. According to this agreement, Batumi District still remained part of Georgia, but of Soviet Georgia.

Despite this, on March 17, the commander of Turkish units in Batumi, Kâzım Karabekir declared himself the governor-general of Batumi district, the Turkish units occupied the barracks, post-telegraph, militia and other buildings. On March 17–18, as a result of the Kutaisi negotiations, a ceasefire was agreed between the Mensheviks and the Bolsheviks. The Bolsheviks demanded from Mensheviks to recognize the Soviet government of Georgia. According to the decision of the founding assembly of the Democratic Republic of Georgia, the government decided to go into exile and it did not recognize the occupation of the country as legal.

One of the main goals of the Kutaisi negotiations, together with the cessation of the war, was the expulsion of Turkish units from Batumi. The Menshevik government and the Revolutionary Committee signed an agreement on joint defense of Batumi. The local communists were freed from jail by the Menshevik government and the Red Army was allowed to enter the district. The Soviet invasion of Georgia was coming to an end, and a small number of Georgian units was stationed in Batumi district and on the Javakheti line. One group of the Russian army under the command of Dimitri Zhloba passed through the Goderdzi pass to the back of the Georgian army in Batumi district.

== Battle ==
The Bolsheviks wanted to avoid a confrontation with Turkey but were willing fight rather than to give up Batumi to Turks. The agreement with Mensheviks allowed them erect a political screen from behind which to attack the Turks indirectly. The supposedly autonomous revolutionary committee was organized from local communists in Batumi.

The Bolsheviks approached Giorgi Mazniashvili, the general of Georgian Democratic Republic, to retake Batumi. In a conversation, Bolshevik leader Sergo Orjonikidze told Mazniashvili to side with Bolsheviks or face repression as the Menshevik general. Giorgi Mazniashvili agreed by replying: "I am neither Menshevik nor Bolshevik general, I am a general of Georgia". He organized a military force from the remnants of disorganized and disoriented Georgian army. Mazniashvili was supported by the Red Army division and the local communists. Russian troops were sent into the city, but they did not fight.

On March 18–19, the Georgian units under the command of General Giorgi Mazniashvili fought against the Turkish soldiers commanded by Kazim Karabekir and managed to defeat them. On March 20, the Turks left Batumi. After defeating Turks, Mazniashvili handed over the city to the newly established Bolshevik regime of Georgia.

== Sources ==
- Debro, Richard (1992). Survival and Consolidation: The Foreign Policy of Soviet Russia, 1918-1921. McGill-Queen's Press. ISBN 9780773508286.
- Rayfield, Donald (2012). Edge of Empires: A History of Georgia (Kindle ed.). London: Reaktion Books. ISBN 978-1-78023-030-6.
- Gogolishvili, Otar (2019). "Heroes of Batumi, Events of March 18-20 March in 1921: Summery". Politics (in Georgian). Tbilisi: Tbilisi State University.

== See also ==
Soviet invasion of Armenia Soviet invasion of Azerbaijan Turkish invasion of Armenia
