= Battle of Kars (1920) =

Largest battle of the Turkish–Armenian War

Coordinates: 40°36′28″N 43°05′45″E

- Part of the Turkish invasion of Armenia
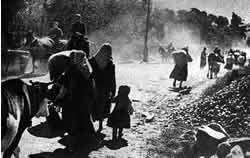
- Armenian civilians fleeing Kars after its capture by Kazım Karabekir's forces.
Date	30 October 1920
Location	Kars, Kars Province, Republic of Armenia (present-day Turkey)
Result	Turkish victory: Turkish capture of Kars leading to expulsion of Armenian civilians from Kars

Belligerents
(First Republic of Armenia) Armenia	Ankara Government

Commanders and leaders
Movses Silikian (Note: Theater Commander); Daniel Bek-Pirumian (POW) (Note: Front and Fortress Commander); Harutiun Hovsepian (Note: Central Theater Commander); Hovhannes Ghazarian (POW) (Note: Front Commander (appointed shortly before the fall of Kars))	Kâzım Karabekir (Note: Front Commander); Halit Karsıalan (Note: 9th Caucasus Division Commander); Osman Nuri Koptagel (Note: 12th Infantry Division Commander); Rüştü Pasha (Note: Conglomerate Division Commander)

Strength
~10,000 regulars (excluding auxiliary units)	7,700

Casualties and losses
500–1,110 killed, ~2,000 captured	9 killed, 42 wounded (Turkish report)

The Battle of Kars (Note: Armenian: Կարսի ճակատամարտ or Կարսի անկում (Fall of Kars); Turkish: Kars Muharebesi.) was the largest battle of the Turkish invasion of Armenia, which took place on October 30, 1920. It was fought between forces loyal to the Grand National Assembly under the command of Kâzım Karabekir and the army of the First Republic of Armenia. Karabekir's army captured the fortified city of Kars after launching a massive assault, taking minor casualties and capturing around 3,000 Armenian soldiers, as well as several high-ranking Armenian military officers and civilian officials. The swift capture of Kars opened the path for Turkish forces to advance towards Armenia's largest city at the time, Alexandropol, and effectively decided solidified Turkey's invasion and occupation of Armenian territory.

== Background ==
The full-scale invasion of Armenia by General Kâzım Karabekir's army (the XV Corps) began on September 28, 1920. The next day, September 29, Karabekir's forces captured Sarıkamış without a fight after its Armenian garrison and civilian population retreated to Kars. Kağızman was also evacuated and fell soon after. Karabekir's army then moved towards Kars, but this assault was delayed by Armenian resistance, as well as Turkish concerns about a potential British or Russian intervention in response to the offensive. The Armenian leadership was caught by surprise by the Turkish advance and the sudden fall of Sarıkamış. Armenian ministers Simon Vratsian and Artashes Babalian were sent to Kars to help prepare the defense of the city and the surrounding province. On October 7, Mustafa Kemal emphasized the importance of taking Kars in order to impose Turkey's demands on Armenia and gave Karabekir "freedom of action to make use of all favorable opportunities" to capture the city.

Despite the initial losses, the Armenian government and military leadership was generally optimistic about the situation at the front in mid-October. The strength of Karabekir's army was underestimated by Armenian intelligence, while Armenian units had been replenished by volunteers, reaching a strength of nearly 10,000 on the Kars front, where half of the Armenian army was concentrated. However, Armenian morale suffered a significant blow after a failed counter-offensive on October 14 that allowed further Turkish advances. By October 20, the Turkish leadership had concluded that no outside powers would act to stop the capture of Kars and that the time to attack the city had come.

=== Situation in Kars ===
General Daniel Bek Pirumian commanded both Kars fortress (a formidable castle equipped with heavy cannons) and the Kars section of the front, with Colonel Vahan Ter-Arakelian as his chief of staff, Colonel Babajanov commanding the fortress artillery and General Harutyun Hovsepian manning the area along the road and railroad between Kars and Sarıkamış. Under Hovsepian's command were colonels Hovhannes Mazmanian (1st Regiment), Mirimanian (4th Regiment), and Shaghubadian (5th Regiment). Sebouh Nersesian's brigade defended the far right flank facing Ardahan; under his command were colonels Dmitry Korganian (1st and 2nd cavalry battalions), Ishkhanian (7th Regiment) and Tigran Baghdasarian (8th Regiment), as well as several Western Armenian volunteer detachments. Colonel Alexander Vekilian coordinated operations from General Movses Silikyan's headquarters in Alexandropol and later arrived in Kars.

The morale and organization of the Armenian defenders on the Kars front were harmed by a number of factors, such as the long-standing rivalry between the civilian and military administrations, represented by Governor-General Stepan Korganian on one side and generals Pirumian and Hovsepian on the other. Many of the troops were fresh volunteers not well-acquainted with their commanding officers, and there was poor cohesion between Eastern Armenian regulars and Western Armenian soldiers accustomed to partisan warfare. Defeatist propaganda and acts of sabotage by Armenian Bolsheviks are also said to have negatively affected the morale of the defenders of Kars. There were also reports of looting in the city in the lead-up to the battle, and the military command was blamed for not taking sufficient action to maintain order. Ministers Vratsian and Babalian criticized generals Pirumian and Hovsepian in their report to Yerevan, claiming that Kars's Armenian population did not trust them and blaming them for the earlier losses in September.

== Battle ==
=== Preparations ===
Karabekir's plan to was to avoid a frontal attack on the city (thereby avoiding its cannons) and instead surround it from the rear and cut off the railway and road to Alexandropol. Most of Halit Bey's 9th Caucasus Division, supported by cavalry, tribal and artillery regiments, was to bypass the left wing of the Armenian defenses and reach the heights of Mağaracık, Vezinköy, (Note: Present-day Ölçülü, Kars Province.) and Yahni to the east of the fortress. Lieutenant Colonel Osman Nuri's 12th Division would carry out a diversion along the heavily fortified western flank from the Üçler heights to Mount Akbaba, while Colonel Rüştü Pasha's division would advance on the western and northwestern sides and complete the encirclement of Kars. The final assault on Kars was originally planned to take place on October 27, although it was delayed to October 30 due to bad weather conditions. Karabekir oversaw the entire operation from the nearby heights of Berna. (Note: Now Koyunyurdu, Selim in Kars Province.)

Before the battle Karabekir attempted to set the Armenians on the wrong track by dispatching false messages about troop movements. In the days leading up to the assault Turkish troops captured several strategic heights around Kars and placed the city at risk of encirclement. On October 28, 2,000 Turkish troops took their positions at the Vezinköy-Yahni heights, while Armenian forces withdrew from fortified positions and heights on three sides of Kars to positions closer to the city. An attack by Turkish cavalry on Mezraa train station was beaten back, but raised serious concerns that the Armenians' escape route could be cut off. Although by October 29 the fortress was surrounded on three sides, the General Pirumian assured the Armenian ministry of military affairs that the fortress could withstand the enemy. On the evening of October 29, Colonel Mazmanian tried to retake the heights of Vezinköy with his 1st Regiment, but his men refused to follow him, after which Mazmanian committed suicide. The Armenians had abandoned many of their key positions without a serious fight and fled to the main fortress of Kars. Reinforcements were sent from the east to secure the connection between Kars and Alexandropol, and General Hovsepian was replaced by General Hovhannes Ghazarian at the last minute.

=== Fall of Kars ===
On the morning of October 30, the Turkish troops began their operation to surround and capture the fortress. After successfully capturing the important height of Fort Lazarev, Turkish troops entered the city almost unopposed from the plain, causing panic among the city's civilians and the defending soldiers. Chaos ensued as civilians and soldiers tried to flee the city, hardly putting up any resistance to the Turks. At noon, seeing that the situation was hopeless, Colonel Vahan Ter-Arakelian, General Pirumian's chief of staff, came out of the citadel with a white flag to offer their surrender in exchange for the sparing of the civilian population and proper treatment of prisoners of war. By the mid-afternoon of October 30, the last pockets of Armenian resistance had been defeated.

== Aftermath ==
The city's civilian population had been forbidden to leave prior to the battle, so most of Kars's 40,000 inhabitants were there on the day of its capture. Many that did not manage to escape were massacred (6,000 according to Simon Vratsian) or taken hostage by the invading Turkish army. Generals Pirumian, Araratov, and Ghazarian, Colonels Shaghubadian, Vekilian, Babajanov, and Ter-Arakelian, thirty-odd officers and about 3,000 soldiers, as well as Acting Minister of Welfare Artashes Babalian, Archbishop Garegin Hovsepiants, Vice-Governor Ruben Chalkhushian, and Mayor Hamzasp Norhatian were taken prisoner. Most of the junior officers and enlisted men who were captured were taken to Erzurum for confinement and forced labor, where many of them died during the winter. Large amounts of military materiel, artillery, locomotives and other equipment were left behind by the Armenians.

Because the Turkish troops had not succeeded in completely surrounding the city, most of the Armenian battalions managed to escape, but the fall of Kars destroyed the fighting ability of the Armenian army. Turkish forces continued to advance and soon captured the city of Alexandropol (present-day Gyumri, Armenia) one week after the capture of Kars. On November 12, the Turks also captured the strategic village of Aghin, northeast of the ruins of the former Armenian capital of Ani and then planned to move towards Yerevan.

== Bibliography ==
- Hovannisian, Richard G. (1996). The Republic of Armenia, Vol. IV: Between Crescent and Sickle, Partition and Sovietization. Berkeley: University of California Press. ISBN 0-520-08804-2.
- Hakobyan, Tatul (2013). Armenians and Turks: From War to Cold War to Diplomacy. Yerevan: Lusakn. ISBN 978-9939-0-0706-9.
- Hewsen, Robert H. (2001). Armenia: A Historical Atlas. University of Chicago Press. ISBN 0-226-33228-4.
- Selvi, Ömer (June 2007). Turkish-Armenian Relationship During the Turkish National Independence Struggle and the Gumru Agreement (in Turkish). Eskişehir Osmangazi University, Institute of Social Science. pp. 108–110.
- Vratsʻyan, Simon (1993). Hayastani Hanrapetutʻyun (PDF) (in Armenian). Yerevan: Hayastan. ISBN 5540014529.
- Walker, Christoper J. (1980). Armenia: The Survival of a Nation. London: Croom Helm.
