= Battle of Sarikamish (1920) =

Battle during the Turkish-Armenian war

- Part of the Turkish–Armenian War
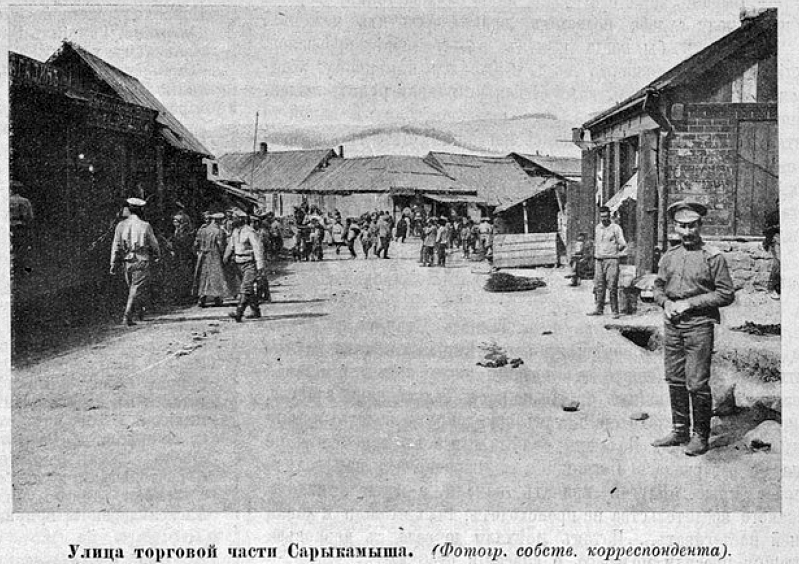
Date	September 29, 1920
Location	Sarıkamış (present-day Kars Province, Turkey)
Result	Turkish victory

Belligerents
(First Republic of Armenia) Armenia	(Ottoman Empire) Ankara Government

Commanders and leaders
(First Republic of Armenia) Simon Vratsian (First Republic of Armenia) Dr. Artashes Babalian	(Ottoman Empire) Kâzım Karabekir (Ottoman Empire) Osman Koptagel (Ottoman Empire) Halit Karsıalan

Strength
2,500 infantry 400 cavalry 70 machine guns and 18 cannons	Elements of the 12th division

The Battle of Sarıkamış was a conflict between the First Republic of Armenia and the Eastern Front of the Army of the Grand National Assembly of Turkey which was on September 29, 1920, at Sarıkamış. After the Sarikamish war signed the Armistice of Mudros, the Turks launched an invasion of Armenia, keeping the Armenians away from the Sarikamis front. Under the leadership of Mustafa Kemal Ataturk, Kazim He directed Karabekir there, and as a result of a successful war, the Turks annexed Kars and other provinces to their territory. The Armenian soldiers who remained there were either killed or exiled. No exchange was found. Estimated Armenian soldier deaths were 1000.

== Background ==
In late September 1920 the Armenians initiated several attacks against Turkish forces in the area. On 24 September an Armenian force of at least 800 men, supported with nine machine guns, began an unsuccessful attack against the weak Turkish entrenchments in Bardız Şenkaya. The attack was repulsed and cost them 47 killed and several wounded. Additionally, two machine guns and ammunition were captured by the Turks. The Turks suffered eight killed and ten wounded during the attack. These attacks gave the Turkish commanders an insight into Armenian military capabilities.

== Active Stage ==
The Turkish forces quickly defeated the Armenian troops in the town. The remaining Armenian forces retreated to the Kötek-Selim-Göle line and stayed there until 30 September.

== Results ==
By September 29, Karabekir's forces had retaken Sarıkamış and the following day Kağızman.
