= Battle of Oltu =

Battles of Oltu
- Part of the Turkish–Armenian War
Date	25 June 1920, 5 September 1920
Location	Oltu, Armenia (present-day Oltu District of Turkey) 40.5497°N 41.9997°E
Result	First battle: Armenian victory Second Battle: Turkish victory: Start of Turkish-Armenian War
Territorial changes	Armenia captures eastern part of Oltu; After Second Battle Turks captured Olti Okrug and Kars Oblast

Belligerents
(First Republic of Armenia) Republic of Armenia	Ottoman Empire (until Second Battle); Grand National Assembly of Turkey

Commanders and leaders
(First Republic of Armenia) Harutyun Hovsepian (First Republic of Armenia) Hovhannes Mazmanian (First Republic of Armenia) Col. Shahbudaghian (First Republic of Armenia) Nesterovskii	(Ottoman Empire) Ali Riza Bey (Ottoman Empire) Kâzım Karabekir (Ottoman Empire) Halit Karsıalan

The Battles of Oltu were two armed conflicts; the first (18–25 June 1920) took place between Armenia and Turkish militias in the Oltu region, which at this time was part of Armenia. The second battle was fought on 3–5 September 1920, marking the beginning of the Turkish invasion of Armenia, resulting in Turkish forces driving the Armenians out of Oltu.

== Background ==
After the Russo-Turkish War of 1877-1878, according to the Treaty of San Stefano and the Treaty of Berlin, the surroundings of Oltu were annexed by the Russian Empire in 1878, forming the Olti okrug of the Kars oblast. At the beginning of World War I, the Ottoman Empire briefly occupied these lands, but at the by the beginning of 1915, Russia regained control of them.

After World War I ended with Ottoman Empire defeat and the Russian Empire had come apart in the Russian Civil War, separate governments formed in Georgia and Armenia. The Treaty of Sèvres which established the new boundaries for the Ottoman Empire had not yet been signed. The district of Oltu, known then as Ardahan-Olty, was disputed by Georgia, Armenia and Turkey. Georgia assumed de jure authority over it when they claimed independence on May 26, 1918. The Republic of Armenia also assumed de jure authority over this region on May 28, 1918.

== First battle of Oltu ==
The conflict arose when the Democratic Republic of Georgia failed to maintain control over the district of Oltu, and local Muslim warlords assumed control in their stead. The local Turkish tribes had skirmished with Armenian border troops, and as a result the local Armenian commander initiated a punitive expedition into the Oltu district. On 16 June 1920 Armenian forces invaded the eastern half of the Oltu district, annexing it to Armenia. Meanwhile, the Treaty of Sèvres was signed. Under the terms of the treaty, portions of northeastern Ottoman Empire were allotted to the Republic of Armenia and subsequently came to be known as Wilsonian Armenia, after the US President Woodrow Wilson.

== Second battle of Oltu ==
In August, the Armenian government attempted to occupy the remainder of the Oltu district as well as the city of Oltu. In response, General Kâzım Karabekir led four Turkish battalions into the district on 3 September and drove the Armenians out. Karabekir then invaded the Republic of Armenia on 20 September prompting the Armenian government to declare war on Turkey four days later, thus beginning the Turkish–Armenian War.
