= Hartagyugh =

Hartagyugh Հարթագյուղ
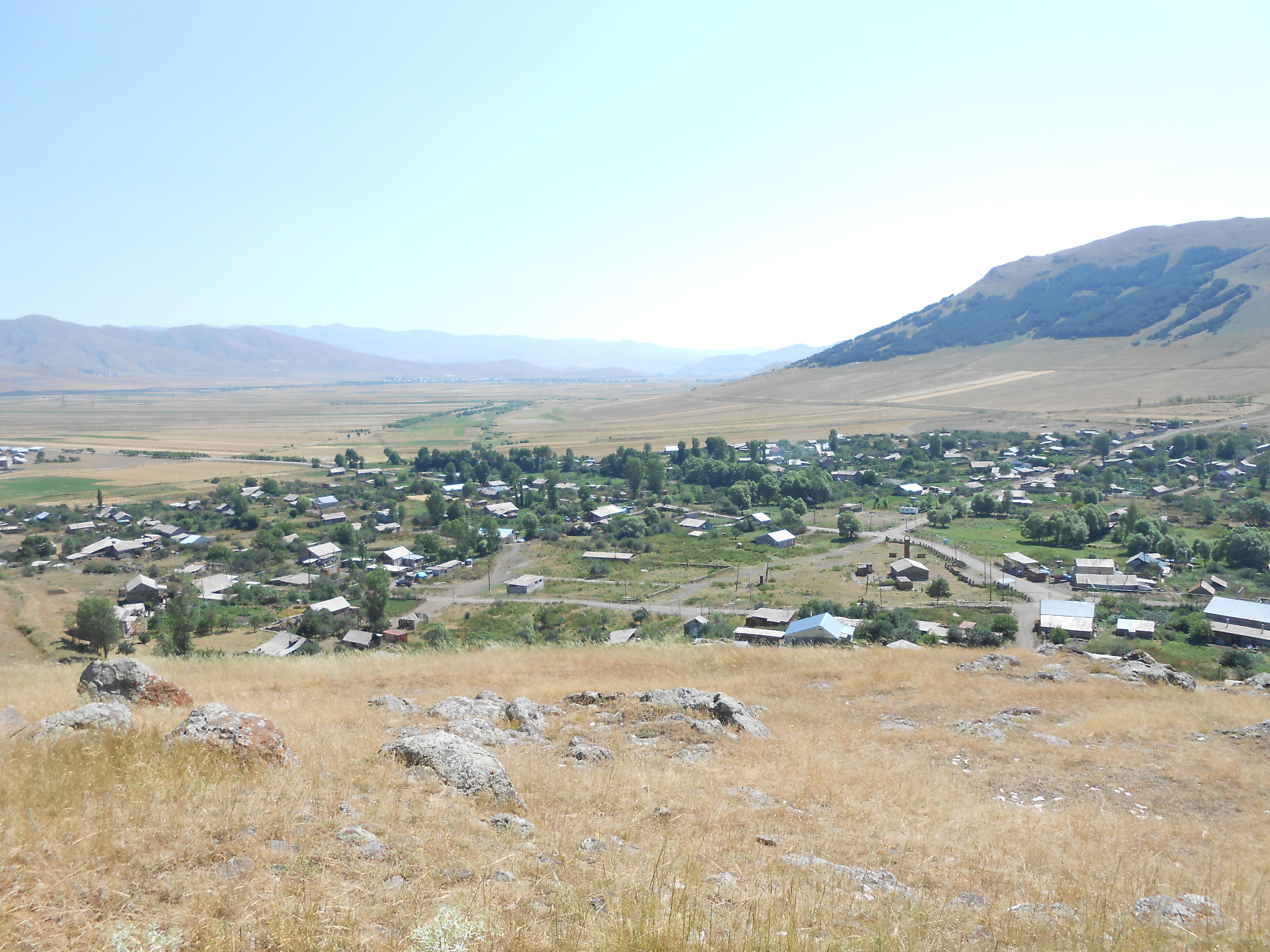

- Location within Armenia
- Coordinates: 40°50′08″N 44°02′48″E
- Country: Armenia
- Province: Lori
- Municipality: Spitak
- Elevation: 1,730 m (5,680 ft)

Population (2011)
  - Total: 1,035
- Time zone: UTC+4
- Website: http://bager.am/

Hartagyugh (Armenian: Հարթագյուղ) is a town in the Lori Province of Armenia. The village was founded in 1820 by Western Armenian immigrants. The ancestors of the inhabitants came from Basen, Mush, Erzurum, Alashkert, Van and Kars. The settlement has existed since the 4th millennium BC.

== History ==
During the 1920 Turkish–Armenian war, the village (known then as Ghaltakhchi) was occupied by Turkish forces and 2,100 of its inhabitants were massacred.

== Demographics ==
The population of the village since 1831 is as follows:

Year	Population
1831	195
1897	1,514
1926	969
1939	1,507
1959	1,620
1970	1,722
1979	1,344
2001	1,226
2004	1,500
2008	1,265
