= Lusaghbyur, Lori =

Lusaghbyur Լուսաղբյուր Aghbulagh
- Location within Armenia
- Coordinates: 40°51′55″N 44°01′50″E
- Country: Armenia
- Province: Lori
- Municipality: Spitak
- Elevation: 1,800 m (5,900 ft)

Population (2011)
  - Total: 917
- Time zone: UTC+4
  - Summer (DST): UTC+5

Lusaghbyur (Armenian: Լուսաղբյուր) is a town in the Spitak Municipality within the Lori Province of Armenia.

== Etymology ==
The village was previously known as Aghbulagh (Աղբուլաղ).

== History ==
During the Turkish–Armenian War in late 1920, The Turkish army massacred 1,186 inhabitants of the village.

== Demographics ==
The population of the village since 1831 is as follows:

Year	Population	Note
1831	152	100% Armenian
1873	768	
1886	967	
1897	1,210	1,172 Armenians, 14 Orthodox, 24 others; 645 men
1904	1,317	
1914	1,637	Mainly Armenian
1916	1,618	
1919	2,077	Mainly Armenian
1922	589	100% Armenian
1926	915	100% Armenian; 467 men
1931	1,217	100% Armenian
1939	1,350	
1959	1,210	
1979	1,056	
2001	998	
2004	1,110	
