= Eastern Front (Turkey) =

- Active: June 9–15, 1920–March 20, 1921
- Country: Turkey
- Size: Front
- Part of: Turkish Army
- Garrison/HQ: Erzurum, Sarıkamış, Kars
- Engagements: Turkish invasion of Armenia; Turkish invasion of Georgia

Commanders
- Notable commanders: Kâzım Karabekir Pasha; General Hüseyin Yalabık

The Eastern Front (Turkish: Şark Cephesi or Doğu Cephesi) was one of the fronts of the Army of the Grand National Assembly during the Turkish War of Independence. Its commanded all military units in Eastern Region. At first, its headquarters was located at Erzurum, and moved to Sarıkamış, then Kars during the Turkish invasion of Armenia (which itself is usually referred to synecdochically as the Eastern Front of the Turkish War of Independence).

The Eastern Front has its foundations in remnants of the XV Corps of the Ottoman Army. It engaged in the Turkish invasions of Armenia and Georgia.

== Formations ==
=== Order of battle of the XV Corps, April 2, 1919 ===
On April 2, 1919, the XV Corps was organized as follows:

- 3rd Caucasian Division (commander: Kaymakam Halid Bey (Karsıalan), chief of staff: Kurmay Binbaşı Yusuf Kemal Bey, Tortum - Isısu - Zivin - Girekösek areas, headquarters: Girekösek, present-day Yeşildere)
  - 7th Caucasian Infantry Regiment (Zivin, moved to Trabzon)
  - 8th Caucasian Infantry Regiment (Tortum, moved to Gümüşhane)
  - 11th Caucasian Infantry Regiment (İspir, moved to Hopa)
  - 3rd Artillery Regiment
  - Cavalry company
  - Health company
- 9th Caucasian Division (commander: Miralay Rushidi Bey, chief of staff: Kurmay Binbaşı Fahri Bey, Erzurum - Hasankale areas, headquarters: Erzurum)
  - 17th Caucasian Infantry Regiment (Erzurum, moved to Erzincan and Mamahatun areas)
  - 28th Caucasian Infantry Regiment (Hasankale, Bayburt, Hat areas)
  - 29th Caucasian Infantry Regiment (Hasankale)
  - 9th Artillery Regiment (Hasankale)
  - Cavalry company
  - Health company
- 11th Caucasian Division (commander: Kaymakam Djavid Bey (Erdel), chief of staff: Kurmay Binbaşı Veysel Bey (Ünüvar), Doğubayazıt - Van - Erniş areas, headquarters: Van)
  - 18th Caucasian Infantry Regiment (Doğubayazıt area)
  - 33rd Caucasian Infantry Regiment (Erniş)
  - 34th Caucasian Infantry Regiment (Van)
  - 11th Artillery Regiment (1st Battalion - Van, 2nd Battalion - Erniş)
  - Cavalry company (Van)
  - Health company (Van)
- 12th Division (commander: Kaymakam Osman Nuri Bey (Koptagel), chief of staff: Kurmay Yüzbaşı Yusuf Kâmil Bey, Kötek - Tuti - Kamasor present-day Yolaçan, Kars) areas, headquarters: Ali Çeyrek in Horasan)
  - 34th Infantry Regiment (between Horasan and Zirin)
  - 35th Infantry Regiment (Pasin Karakilisesi area)
  - 36th Infantry Regiment (Horasan)
  - 12th Artillery Regiment (one battalion - Tuti, one battalion - Kamasor)
  - Cavalry company
  - Health company
- 15th Infantry Regiment
- 15th Cavalry Regiment (commander: Miralay Mehmed Bey)
- 15th Artillery Regiment (commander: Miralay Faruk Bey)
- 15th Engineer Company
- 15th Construction Company
- 15th Transport Company
- 11th Transport Company
- Transport Company
- Headquarters Cavalry Company
- Flight Squadron
- Telegraph Company
- Service Company
- Wireless Telegraph Company
- Military Band Company
- Erzurum Fortified Area Command
  - Heavy Artillery Regiment
  - Engineer Battalion
  - Wireless Telegraph Detachment
  - Searchlight Detachment

=== Order of Battle of the XV Corps, May 15, 1919 ===
On May 15, 1919, the XV Corps was organized as follows:

=== Order of Battle, June 22, 1920 ===
On June 22, 1920, the Eastern Front was organized as follows:

=== Nahcivan Detachment ===
On August 11, 1920, the Nahcivan Detachment was organized as follows:

- 1st Battalion of the 18th Infantry Regiment
- 1st Battalion of the 34th Infantry Regiment
- Machinegun Company of the 34th Infantry Regiment
- 2nd Company of the 34th Infantry Regiment
- Machinegun Company
- 4th Battery
- HG of the Nahcivan Detachment

=== Order of Battle, October 1, 1922 ===
On October 1, 1922, the Eastern Front still existed.

== See also ==
- Armenian–Azerbaijani war (1918–1920)
- Southern Front of the Russian Civil War
- Soviet invasion of Georgia
- Soviet invasion of Azerbaijan
- Soviet invasion of Armenia
- XV Corps (Ottoman Empire)
- Treaty of Brest-Litovsk
- Treaty of Alexandropol
- Treaty of Kars
