= Turkish invasion of Georgia =

1921 invasion

- Part of the Eastern Front of the Turkish War of Independence and the Soviet invasion of Georgia
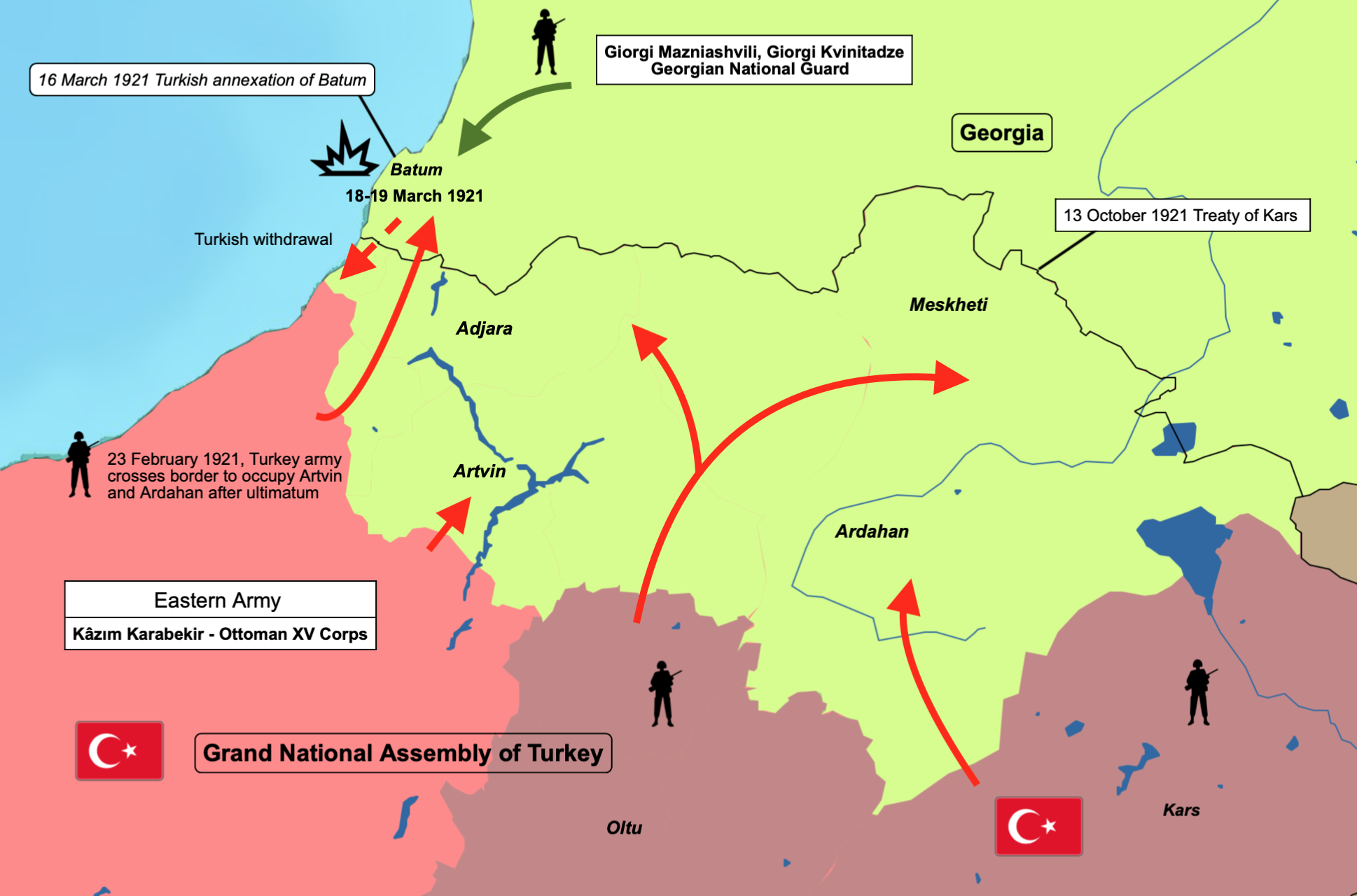
- Turkish movements during the Turkish-Georgian War in 1921
Date	23 February – 20 March 1921
Location	Georgia
Result	Turkish–Soviet victory (Note: Turkish forces were expelled from Batumi by Georgian troops, but the arrival of Red Army units shortly afterward forced Georgian forces to surrender or withdraw.)
Territorial changes	Artvin and Ardahan ceded to Turkey

Belligerents
Ankara Government; Co-belligerent: Soviet Russia; Soviet Armenia; Soviet Azerbaijan	Democratic Republic of Georgia Co-belligerent: Armenian insurgents Republic of Mountainous Armenia; Supported by : Italy (Note: Only for excavation); France (Note: Only for excavation); Greece (Note: Humanitarian)

Commanders and leaders
Kâzım Karabekir	Giorgi Mazniashvili

Strength
3,500 (Note: At the start of the invasion)	3,000 (Note: At the start of the invasion)

Casualties and losses
30 killed (Note: In Battle of Batumi); 26 wounded 46 missing (Turkish sources, during the entire Georgian campaign); More than 200 killed (Note: In Battle of Batumi) (Georgian sources)	84 killed (Note: In Battle of Batumi)
- c. 1,000 Caucasian Greek civilians killed (Note: Russian statistics from 1886 record 78 families (665 people) in Beberek and 50 families (410 people) in Toroskhov, the villages affected by the massacres. This gives a combined average of approximately 8.4 people per family, making 120 families equivalent to approximately 1,000 people.); 470 Armenian civilians killed

The Turkish invasion of Georgia or Turkish–Georgian War was an conflict during the Turkish War of Independence and is sometimes characterized as an extension of the Russian Civil War. The Turkish nationalists sided with the Soviet Union, invading the Democratic Republic of Georgia from the east, continuing the Eastern Front of the Turkish War of Independence.

The Turkish forces invaded Batumi, but after a fierce resistance they were forced to retreat. However, the Soviets in Western Georgia defeated the Georgians and occupied their capital, Tbilisi, forcing them to surrender. Consequently, Georgia was occupied by the Soviets, while Artvin and Ardahan were ceded to Turkey.

== Background ==
On 15 February 1921, the Red Army launched a military operation to Sovietize the Georgian Democratic Republic. After the February Revolution that began in Russia in 1917, Georgia effectively became independent. In April 1918 it joined with Armenia and Azerbaijan to form the Transcaucasian Democratic Federative Republic.

This coalition lasted only a month with Georgia declaring independence as the Democratic Republic of Georgia on 26 May, followed the next day by both Armenia and Azerbaijan. Two days after declaring independence, the Georgian Mensheviks accepted Germany’s offer to establish a protectorate over Georgia.

Georgia engaged in small conflicts with its neighbouring states as it attempted to establish its borders, though it was able to maintain independence and de facto international recognition throughout the Russian Civil War, including being recognized by Soviet Russia in the Treaty of Moscow.

== War ==
=== Turkish involvement ===
As the Soviet invasion of Georgia began, the Turkish Nationalist government adopted a careful yet broad-based approach toward the Northern part of Turkey (from what is now referred to as the Republic of Turkey) and the regional powers with whom it shared borders. To do so, the Turkish government looked for a partner or ally in the Soviet Union to help resist the advances of the Western nations. Additionally, as a result of the disintegration of the South Caucasus states, including Georgia, Turkish leaders looked to take advantage of this situation by seizing land disputed between Turkey and Georgia.

Due to the escalation of hostilities between Russia and Georgia, diplomats in Tbilisi offered to give up the provinces of Ardahan and Artvin to Turkey in exchange for military assistance or at least neutrality. As a result of this agreement, Turkish troops commanded by Kâzım Karabekir on the Eastern Front entered Georgian territory and occupied Ardahan, Artvin, Ardanuç, and Oltu by 23 February. After Tbilisi fell to Russian forces, Turkish forces moved forward to regain areas of Georgia that had been lost since 1828. By the time Georgian forces had reached Akhaltsikhe on 7 March, Turks had already occupied Akhalkalaki and the south-western outskirts of Batumi, facing little opposition from the small Georgian military units present in these areas. However, the Turkish advance came to a halt on 8 March when Dmitry Zhloba and the Red Army's 18th Cavalry Division arrived in Akhaltsikhe, which marked an important change in the fight for control of Georgia.

=== Fall of Western Georgia ===
Although the Armenian nationalists in the February Uprising provided indirect assistance to Georgia, the Soviet forces were able to gain control of Surami, along with the rapid advance of Soviet forces from Abkhazia and Racha, which made the remaining Georgian-held territory impossible to defend. The remnants of Georgian forces in Abkhazia crossed the Inguri River into Zugdidi on March 8. Zugdidi fell to the Soviets on 9 March. Meanwhile, the Mamisoni Group, which had entered Georgia from Oni, destroyed a small Georgian detachment that was stationed in Meqvena and outflanked Kutaisi from the northwest. The 98th Rifle Brigade from Surami entered Kutaisi after approximately two hours of fighting on March 10. While the government of Georgia evacuated Kutaisi and moved to Batumi, some 3,000 Georgian troops fled toward Samtredia, accompanied by armored trains.

In spite of these setbacks, Commander-in-Chief of the Georgian army, Giorgi Kvinitadze, formed a new strategy to continue fighting against the Soviets. His strategy was to have all remaining combat capable units retreat to the Rioni River and cross into the mountainous region of Guria and Adjara. Kvinitadze believed that these areas offered the best opportunities for creating new defensive positions to resist the advancing Soviet army. If this strategy did not work, Kvinitadze would concentrate the government and remaining troops in the well-fortified port city of Batumi, while also using the port city as a refuge from the advancing Soviet forces. However, the last strategic plan of Georgian military leadership failed largely due to the Turkish invasion of Batumi and Ajaria. Between 11th and 17th of March, the Turks under Kazim Bey entered the city, took over some of the forts of its defense system and tried to take over all other forts still in Georgian hands.

=== Retreat to Batumi ===
Despite Turkish promises for neutrality, the Turks violated their obligation and further invaded Akhaltsikhe, Akhalkalaki, and Adjara on March 11. They occupied those regions, with the aim of annexing them to Turkey. This is widely seen as a betrayal and a demonstration of Turkish treachery by Georgians. By 25 February, 1921, the Georgian Mensheviks had fled Tiblisi.

The Bolsheviks wanted to avoid a confrontation with Turkey but were willing fight rather than to give up those regions to the Turks. With defeat imminent, the Georgian government sent representatives to Kutaisi to negotiate a ceasefire with the Red Army command which was also overstretched and scattered. An agreement was reached on 14 March giving the Georgian authorities several days to demobilise the remaining units of the Georgian army and evacuate Batumi to Constantinople (Istanbul).

On 17 March, the members of the Georgian national government and senior military leadership and thousands of soldiers and civilians left for two French ships and one Italian ship anchored at the Batumi harbour to be ready for departure the next morning. The Georgian troops still based in Batumi were put under the command of General Giorgi Mazniashvili who would supervise their demobilisation. That same day, against the terms of the Treaty of Moscow which was signed a day before, Kazım Bey, commander of Turkish troops in the region surrounding Batumi, declared Batumi under Turkish administration and appointed himself governor-general. He demanded the disarmament of the surviving Georgian troops.

The Bolsheviks approached Giorgi Mazniashvili, the general of Georgian Democratic Republic, to retake Batumi. In a conversation, Bolshevik leader Sergo Orjonikidze told Mazniashvili to side with Bolsheviks or face repression as the Menshevik general. Giorgi Mazniashvili agreed by replying: "I am neither Menshevik nor Bolshevik general, I am a general of Georgia". He organized a military force from the remnants of disorganized and disoriented Georgian army. Mazniashvili ordered his troops to attack the Turkish forces and push them out of the city. He was supported by a Red Army division and the local communists. Russian troops were sent into the city, but they did not fight.

On 18–19 March, the Georgian units under the command of General Giorgi Mazniashvili fought against the Turkish soldiers commanded by Kazim Karabekir and managed to defeat them. On 20 March, the Turks left Batumi. After defeating the Turks, Mazniashvili handed over the city to the newly established Bolshevik regime of Georgia.

== Atrocities ==
In February 1921, during the beginning of the invasion, massacres of the civilian population ensued in Ardahan. The Caucasian Greek inhabitants in the villages of Peperek/Beberek and Toroskhov (modern Çetinsu and Çimenkaya), who were protected by Georgian Army, stayed in their villages even after the departure of the Georgian troops. Around 120 Greek families (c. 1,000 people) were killed by Turkish forces in these villages. A few survivors who managed to escape the onslaught fled to the port of Batumi, heading to Greece, which was conducting humanitarian operations in the Lesser Caucasus since 1919.

In March 1921, during the Turkish advance into the Akhalkalaki district, Armenian civilians were also massacred. Turkish forces killed 350 captured villagers near Gumburdo, some by throwing them into wells or stoning them. In addition, near Vardzia, 120 Armenian young men were tied together and shot on the heights.

During the first night of the Battle of Batumi, Turkish soldiers began looting shops of the native non-Turkish population, but Georgian patrol and cavalry successfully dispersed the looters and recovered many of the stolen items. In Batumi, a proclamation issued by Kâzım Karabekir prohibited non-Turks from carrying weapons.

== Aftermath ==
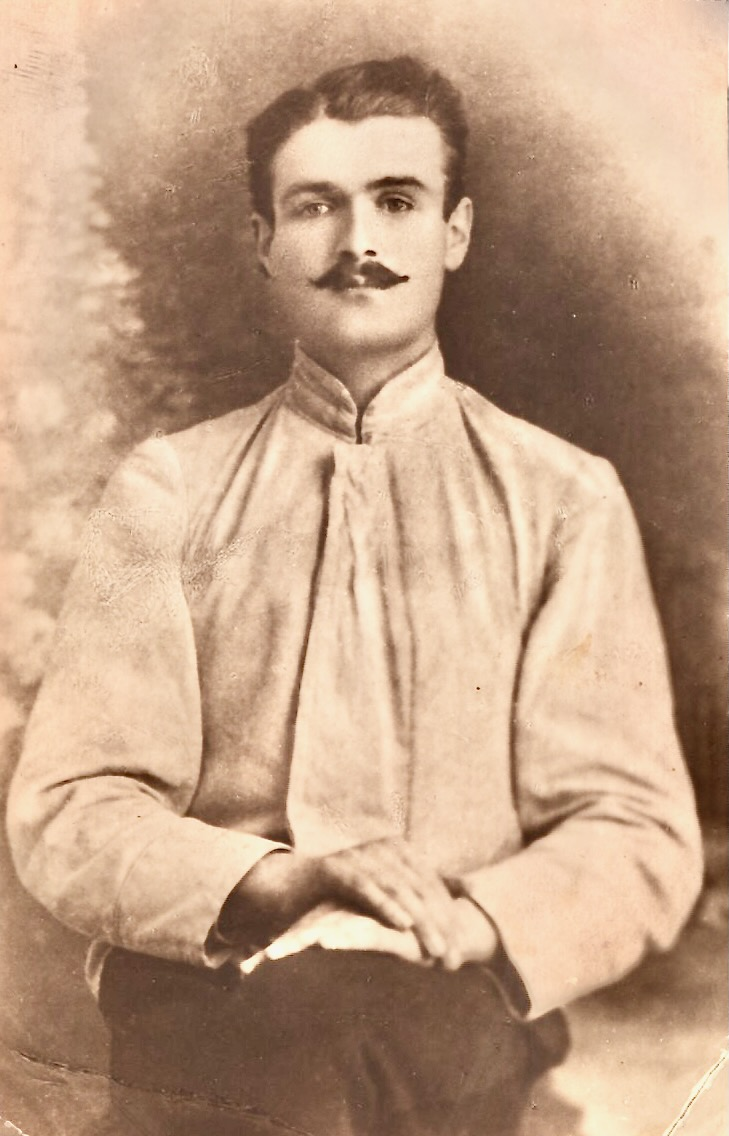
Jason Kereselidze was executed for resisting Soviet occupation, but his brother Leo Kereselidze continued Georgian nationalist activities in exile.

Despite the Georgian government's emigration and the demobilization of the National Army, pockets of guerrilla resistance still remained in the mountains and some rural areas. The invasion of Georgia brought about serious controversies among the Bolsheviks themselves. The newly established Communist government initially offered unexpectedly mild terms to their former opponents who still remained in the country. Lenin also favored a policy of conciliation in Georgia, where a pro-Bolshevik revolt did not enjoy the popular backing claimed for it, and the population was solidly anti-Bolshevik. In 1922, a strong public resentment over the forcible Sovietization indirectly reflected in the opposition of Soviet Georgian authorities to Moscow's centralizing policies promoted by Dzerzhinsky, Stalin and Ordzhonikidze. The problem, known in modern history writing as the "Georgian Affair", was to become one of the major points at issue between Stalin and Trotsky in the last years of Lenin's leadership and found its reflection in "Lenin's Political Testament".

The world largely neglected the violent Soviet and Turkish takeover of Georgia. On 27 March 1921, the exiled Georgian leadership issued an appeal from their temporary offices in Constantinople, which was occupied by the Entente, to "all socialist parties and workers' organizations" of the world, protesting against the invasion of Georgia. However, the appeal went unheeded. Beyond passionate editorials in some Western newspapers and calls for action from such Georgian sympathizers as Sir Oliver Wardrop, the international response to the events in Georgia was silence.

In Georgia, an intellectual resistance to the Bolshevik regime and occasional outbreaks of guerrilla warfare evolved into a major rebellion in August 1924. Its failure and the ensuing wave of large-scale repressions orchestrated by the emerging Soviet security officer, Lavrentiy Beria, heavily demoralized the Georgian society and exterminated its most active pro-independence part. Within a week, from 29 August to 5 September 1924, 12,578 people, chiefly nobles and intellectuals, were executed and over 20,000 exiled to Siberia. From that time, no major overt attempt was made to challenge Soviet authority in the country until a new generation of anti-Soviet movements emerged in 1956.

== Legacy ==
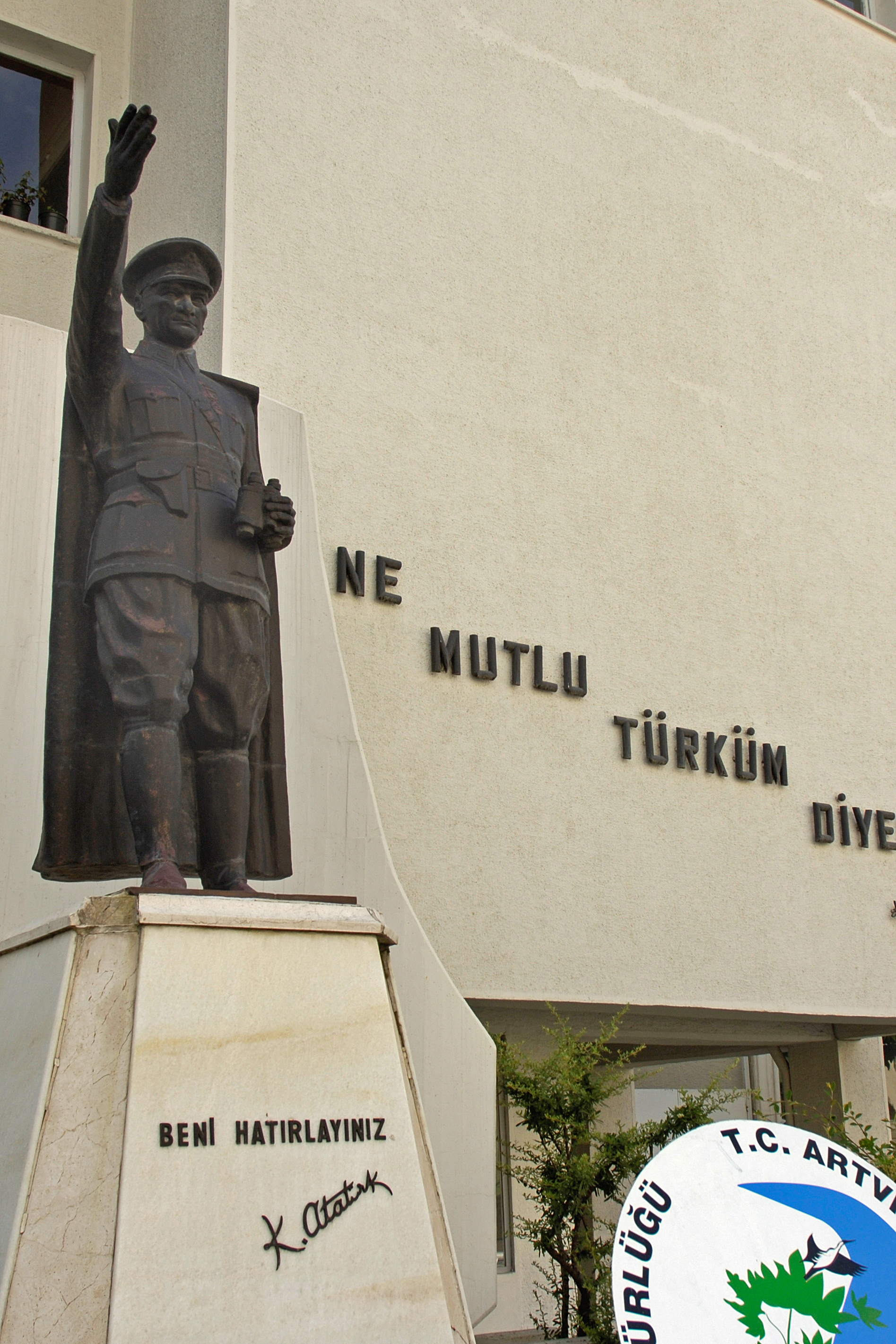
Atatürk monument in Artvin, captured during the invasion. On the wall, it says: "How happy is the one who says I am a Turk."

Turkish historians justify the invasion and annexation of Arvin and Ardahan, claiming that there was a "4,000-year Turkish presence in the region". The Turkish general and politician Kâzım Karabekir is hailed in Turkey as the "Savior of the East" due to his "liberation" of territories which were "occupied" by Russia, Armenia and Georgia.

The loss of Batumi in the Battle of Batumi is, however, still considered a concession from the Misak-ı Milli in Turkey. In a 2016 speech, Turkish president Recep Tayyip Erdoğan mentioned Batumi in the context of Ankara's "heart and soul geography", while also asking: "Our physical boundaries are different from the boundaries of our heart...Is it possible to separate Rize from Batumi?".

In the same year, the construction of the Turkish-funded Aziz Mosque, in a square which served as a burial site for Georgian soldiers who died fighting the Turks in 1921, sparked protests in Georgia.

== Bibliography ==
- Debro, Richard (1992). Survival and Consolidation: The Foreign Policy of Soviet Russia, 1918–1921. McGill-Queen's Press. ISBN 978-0-7735-0828-6.
- Carr, E. H. (1950), The Bolshevik Revolution 1917–1923, vol. I, London: MacMillan & Co.
- Gachechiladze, Revaz (2012), "Geopolitics and foreign powers in the modern history of Georgia: Comparing 1918–21 and 1991–2010", in Jones, Stephen F. (ed.), The Making of Modern Georgia, 1918–2012: The first Georgian Republic and its successors, New York City: Routledge, pp. 17–34, ISBN 978-0-41-559238-3
- Silakadze, Dimitri (2018). Democratic Republic of Georgia (1918–1921). Tbilisi.
- Tbilisi (2019). Sakartvelos Damoukidebeli Respublikis Entsiklopedia (PDF) (in Georgian). Tbilisi State University.
- Tsvetelina. "Sovietization of Georgia (1918–1921)". DergiPark (in Turkish).
- Andersen, Andrew. "Soviet-Georgian War and Sovietization of Georgia, February–March 1921". Iberiana.
- Suny, Ronald Grigor (1994), The Making of the Georgian Nation (Second ed.), Bloomington, Indiana: Indiana University Press, ISBN 978-0-253-20915-3
- Şakir, Burak. "The Ottoman–Saudi Conflict of 1811–1818: An Overview". DergiPark.
- Zosidze, Nugzar. "National and Transnational Memory of the Abkhaz–Georgian Conflict". Iem.ge Journal.
