= Battle of Kojori-Tabakhmela =

Tiflis Operation of 1921
- Part of Red Army invasion of Georgia
Date	February 1921
Location	near Tbilisi, Georgia
Result	Georgian tactical victory • Soviets repulsed

Belligerents
Democratic Republic of Georgia	Russian SFSR; Armenian SSR; Azerbaijan SSR

Commanders and leaders
Giorgi Mazniashvili; Giorgi Kvinitadze	Anatoliy Gekker

Strength
People’s Guard of Georgia; Regular Army of the Georgian Democratic Republic	11th Army (RSFSR) 9th Army: 98th Independent Rifle Brigade; Soviet Armenian Mounted Brigade; Red Baku Brigade; Ossetian rebel forces

Casualties and losses
moderate	heavy

Operation of Tiflis in 1921, known as Battles in Kojori-Tabakhmela, were incursions of defensive battles against the Soviets. At dawn on 16 February the main body of 11th Red Army troops under Anatoliy Gekker crossed into Georgia and started the Tiflis Operation aimed at capturing the capital. Georgian border forces under General Stephen Akhmeteli were overwhelmed on the Khrami River. Retreating westward, the Georgian commander General Tsulukidze blew up railway bridges and demolished roads in an effort to delay the enemy's advance. Simultaneously, Red Army units marched into Georgia from the north through the Daryal and Mamisoni passes, and along the Black Sea coast towards Sukhumi. While these events were proceeding, the Soviet Commissar for Foreign Affairs issued a series of statements disclaiming involvement by the Red Army and professing willingness to mediate any disputes that had arisen within Georgia. By 17 February, Soviet infantry and cavalry divisions supported by aircraft were less than 15 kilometers northeast of Tbilisi. The Georgian army put up a stubborn fight in defense of the approaches to the capital, which they held for a week in the face of overwhelming Red Army superiority. From 18 to 20 February, the strategic heights of Kojori and Tabakhmela passed from hand to hand in heavy fighting. Georgian forces under General Giorgi Mazniashvili managed to push the Soviets back inflicting heavy losses; they quickly regrouped and tightened the circle around Tbilisi. By 23 February, the railway bridges had been restored, and Soviet tanks and armoured trains joined in a renewed assault on the capital. While the armoured trains laid down suppressing fire, tanks and infantry penetrated the Georgian positions on the Kojori heights. On 24 February, the Georgian commander-in-chief, Giorgi Kvinitadze, bowed to the inevitable and ordered a withdrawal to save his army from complete encirclement and the city from destruction. The Georgian government and the Constituent Assembly evacuated to Kutaisi in western Georgia, which dealt the Georgian army a significant morale blow. On 25 February, the triumphant Red Army entered Tbilisi. Bolshevik soldiers engaged in widespread looting. The Revkom headed by Mamia Orakhelashvili and Shalva Eliava ventured into the capital and proclaimed the overthrow of the Menshevik government, the dissolution of the Georgian National Army and People's Guard, and the formation of a Georgian Soviet Socialist Republic. On the same day, in Moscow, Lenin received the congratulations of his commissars – "The Soviet red flag is flying over Tbilisi. Long live Soviet Georgia!"

== Background ==
The tactics used by the Soviets to gain control of Georgia were similar to those applied in Azerbaijan and Armenia in 1920, namely sending in the Red Army while encouraging local Bolsheviks to stage unrest. However, this policy proved more difficult to implement in Georgia, where the Bolsheviks did not enjoy popular support and remained a relatively isolated political force. On the night of 11–12 February 1921, at the instigation of Sergo Ordzhonikidze, Bolsheviks attacked Georgian military posts in the predominantly Armenian district of Lori and the nearby village of Shulaveri, near the Armenian and Azerbaijani borders. Georgia had taken control of the Lori "neutral zone" in a disputed Armeno–Georgian borderland in October 1920, citing the need to defend the district and approaches to Tiflis during the period of regional instability. The Armenian government protested but was unable to resist. Shortly after the Bolshevik revolt, Red Army units based in Armenia moved to assist the insurgents, initially without formal authorization from Moscow. When the Georgian government protested to the Soviet envoy in Tbilisi, Aron Sheinman denied any involvement, claiming the disturbances were a spontaneous uprising by Armenian communists. Meanwhile, the Bolsheviks established a Georgian Revolutionary Committee (Revkom) in Shulaveri, which soon assumed the role of a rival government. Led by Filipp Makharadze, the Revkom formally appealed to Moscow for assistance. Unrest also broke out in the town of Dusheti and among Ossetian groups in northeastern Georgia, who opposed the Georgian government's policies and demands for autonomy. Georgian forces managed to suppress some of these disturbances, but preparations for a broader Soviet intervention were already underway. As Georgian troops moved into Lori to suppress the revolt, Vladimir Lenin ultimately approved requests from Joseph Stalin and Sergo Ordzhonikidze to authorize a Red Army intervention under the pretext of supporting a local uprising. The decision was taken during a meeting of the Central Committee of the Communist Party on 14 February 1921, which conditionally approved military support for the uprising and the advance toward Tiflis. The decision was not unanimous. It faced opposition from some Bolshevik leaders, including Karl Radek, and was initially kept from Leon Trotsky, who was absent at the time. Upon learning of the decision, Trotsky expressed dissatisfaction and later called for an investigation, though no formal inquiry was carried out. Despite this, he later accepted and defended the invasion in subsequent writings.

== Aftermath ==
Despite Georgian tactical successes in the early phases of the Battle of Kojori–Tabakhmela, the Red Army regrouped and reinforced its positions with additional troops and artillery. Renewed Soviet offensives eventually forced the Georgian defenders to retreat from their fortified positions in the highlands. Following the withdrawal of Georgian forces, Soviet units advanced toward Tbilisi. On 25 February 1921, the Red Army entered the city, effectively ending the independence of the Democratic Republic of Georgia. The Georgian government and military leaders evacuated the capital, and many political figures fled abroad. The Soviet takeover marked the beginning of the **Sovietization of Georgia**, including the establishment of the Georgian Soviet Socialist Republic. Widespread repression followed, with arrests, executions, and purges targeting former government officials, military officers, and other perceived opponents. Local resistance continued sporadically in some regions, but the Red Army maintained control over the country. The fall of Tbilisi demonstrated the overwhelming numerical and logistical superiority of the Soviet forces and highlighted the challenges faced by the Georgian army in defending its small, newly independent republic against a large, well-organized invader.

== Sources ==
- National Archives of Georgia. Collections on the Democratic Republic of Georgia (1918–1924). Tbilisi: National Archives. (Includes documents on the Svaneti and Kakheti uprisings, and Kojori–Tabakhmela)
- Soviet Power in Transcaucasia – Stephen F. Jones, 2005. (Analysis of Bolshevik operations and local resistance)

== Further reading / books ==
- Suny, Ronald Grigor. The Making of Modern Georgia, 1918–2012. London: Routledge, 2015. ISBN 978-0-415-59238-3.
- Jones, Stephen F. Socialism in Georgian Colors. Harvard University Press, 2005. ISBN 978-0-674-02626-1.
- Lang, David Marshall. History of the Georgian People. London: Allen & Unwin, 1962.
