= Kâzım Karabekir =

Turkish general and politician (1882–1948)

Musa Kâzım Karabekir
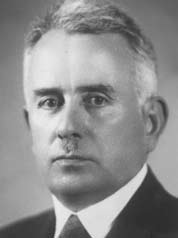
- Karabekir in 1939

Leader of the Progressive Republican Party
- In office 17 November 1924 – 5 June 1925
- Preceded by: Position established
- Succeeded by: Position abolished

5th Speaker of the Grand National Assembly of Turkey
- In office 5 August 1946 – 26 January 1948
- Preceded by: Abdülhalik Renda
- Succeeded by: Ali Fuat Cebesoy

Member of the Grand National Assembly
- In office 1920 – 20 July 1927
- Constituency: Istanbul
- In office 26 March 1939 – 26 January 1948
- Constituency: Istanbul

Personal details
- Born: 1882 Kocamustafapaşa, Istanbul, Istanbul Vilayet, Ottoman Empire
- Died: 26 January 1948 (aged 66) Ankara, Turkey
- Cause of death: Myocardial infarction
- Resting place: Turkish State Cemetery, Ankara, Turkey
- Spouse: İclal Karabekir (m. 1924)
- Children: 3
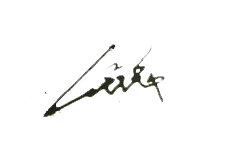
- Signature
- Nickname: Zeyrek

Military service
- Allegiance: Ottoman Empire (1902–1919); Ankara Government (1920–1923); Turkey (1923–1924)
- Branch/service: Ottoman Army; Army of the GNA; Turkish Army
- Years of service: 1902–1924
- Rank: General
- Commands: 1st Expeditionary Force, 14th Division, 18th Corps, II Corps, I Caucasian Corps, XIV Corps, XV Corps, Eastern Front, 1st Army
- Battles/wars: First Balkan War; Bulgarian Front; Siege of Adrianople; World War I; Battle of Erzincan (1918); Capture of Erzurum (1918); Recapture of Kara Kilisa; Second Battle of Kut; Battle of Bughaila; Turkish War of Independence; Turkish invasion of Armenia; Second battle of Oltu; Battle of Surmalu; Battle of Sarikamish (1920); Battle of Kars (1920); Liberation of Ortulu; Battle of Alexandropol; Turkish-Georgian War; Battle of Batumi

Musa Kâzım Karabekir (also Kiazim in English; Ottoman Turkish: موسی كاظم قره بكر, pronounced [ca:'zɯm kaɾabe'ciɾ]; 1882 – 26 January 1948) was a Turkish general and politician. He was the commander of the Eastern Army of the Ottoman Empire during the Turkish War of Independence, and fought a successful military campaign against the Armenian Democratic Republic. He was the founder and leader of the Progressive Republican Party, the Turkish Republic's first opposition party to Atatürk, though he and his party would be purged following the Sheikh Said revolt. He was rehabilitated with İsmet İnönü's ascension to the presidency in 1938 and served as Speaker of the Grand National Assembly of Turkey before his death.

== Early life ==
Karabekir was born in 1882 as the son of an Ottoman general, Mehmet Emin Pasha, in the Kocamustafapaşa quarter of the Kuleli neighborhood of İstanbul, in the Ottoman Empire. The Karabekir family traced its heritage back to the medieval Karamanid principality, in central Anatolia, where his family belonged to the Afshar tribe.

Karabekir toured several places in the Ottoman Empire while his father served in the army. He returned to Istanbul in 1893 with his mother after his father died in Erevan. They settled in the Zeyrek Quarter. Karabekir was put into Fatih Military Secondary School the next year. After finishing his education there, he attended the Kuleli Military High School from which he graduated in 1899. He continued his education at the Ottoman Military College, which he finished on 6 December 1902 at the top of his class.

== Military career ==
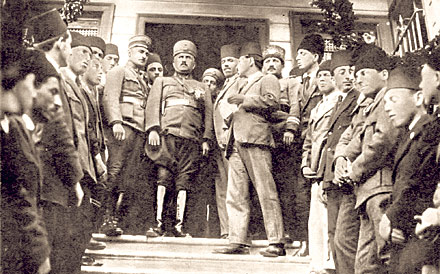
Kâzım Karabekir was appointed the commander of the Ottoman XV Corps and landed at Trabzon on 19 April 1919

As a junior officer, he was commissioned in January 1906 after two months to the Third Army in the region around Bitola in North Macedonia. There, he was involved in fights with Greek and Bulgarian komitadjis. In April 1906, he saw Bulgarian rebels being deported who even being deported shouted a Bulgarian nationalist slogan. He reasoned that the day his nation shows this spirit, his nation will be saved. Later that year, he became the 11th member of the Ottoman Freedom Committee (which in 1907 would become the CUP). For his successful service, he was promoted to the rank of senior captain in 1907. In the following years, he served in Constantinople and again in the Second Army in Edirne.

On 15 April 1911, Kâzım applied to change his family name from Zeyrek to Karabekir. Until then, he had been called Kâzım Zeyrek, after the place in which he lived with his mother, a custom in the Ottoman Empire as family names were not used. From then on, he adopted the name Karabekir, the name of his ancestors.

=== Balkan Wars ===
During his service in Edirne, Karabekir was promoted to the rank of major on 27 April 1912. He took part in the First Balkan War against Bulgarian forces but was captured during the Battle of Edirne-Kale on 22 April 1913. He remained a prisoner-of-war until the armistice of 21 October 1913.

=== World War I ===
Before the outbreak of World War I, Karabekir served in Constantinople and was then sent to some European countries like Austria-Hungary, Germany, France and Switzerland. In July 1914, he returned home, as a world war was likely.

Back in Constantinople, Karabekir was assigned the chief of intelligence at the General Staff. Soon, he was promoted to lieutenant colonel. After a short time on the southeastern front, he was sent to the Dardanelles. As commander of the 14th Division, Karabekir fought in the Battle of Gallipoli in the summer of 1915. In October 1915, he was appointed chief staff officer at the First Army in Istanbul.

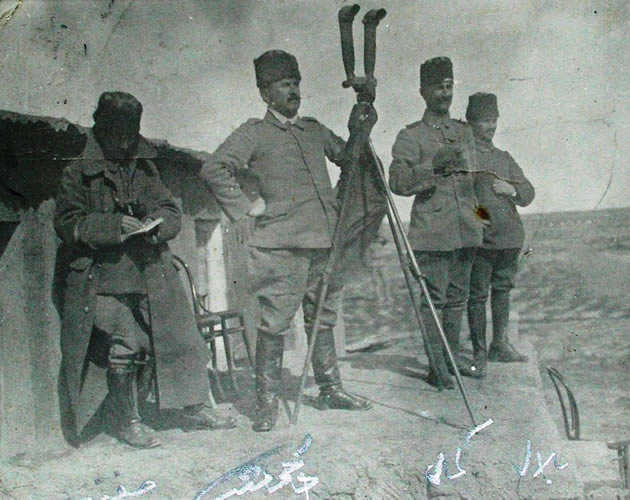
Kiazim Karabekir Bey during the Siege of Kut in 1916

He was commissioned to the Mesopotamian front to join the Sixth Army. For his success at Gallipoli, he was decorated in December 1915 by both the Ottoman and the German Commands and was contemporaneously promoted to colonel. In April 1916, he took over the command of the 18th Corps, which gained a great victory over the British forces led by General Charles Townshend during the Siege of Kut-al Amara in Iraq.

Karabekir was appointed commander of the 2nd Corps on the Caucasus front and fought bitterly against the Russian and Armenian forces for almost ten months. In September 1917, he was promoted to brigadier general by a decree of the Sultan. In May 1918 he became the commander of the 15th Army Corps in Erzurum and as he began to grasp the defeat of the Ottoman Empire in World War I, he began to prepare his forces for a war against the Armenians and Georgians.

=== Turkish War of Independence ===
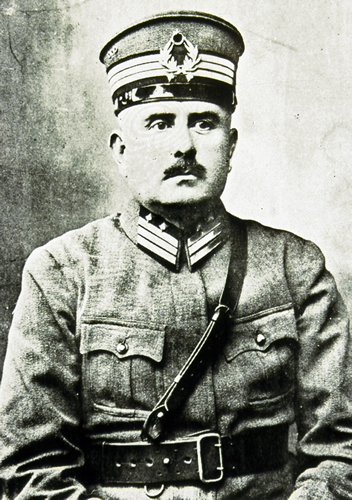
Kâzım Karabekir during the Turkish War of Independence

In compliance with the Treaty of Sèvres, Ottoman Sultan Mehmed VI gave Karabekir the order to surrender to Entente powers, which he refused to obey. Contrary to the orders of the British to demobilize the Ottoman army in Eastern Anatolia, he provided the Turkish rural population with weapons. He stayed in the region and, on the eve of the Erzurum Congress, when Mustafa Kemal (Atatürk) had just arrived in Erzurum, he secured the city with a cavalry brigade under his command to protect him and the congressmen. He pledged with Mustafa Kemal to join the Turkish national movement and then took command of the Eastern Front during the Turkish War of Independence by the Kuva-yi Milliye.

In early September 1920, Karabekir commenced a military invasion of Armenia. There were brief small-scale skirmishes in the region of Oltu, but as the Turkish offensive elicited virtually no reaction from the Allied powers, Karabekir continued the offensive. On 28 September, he sent four divisions from the XV Army Corps across the Armenian border with the objective of capturing the strategic fortress of Sarikamish. Sarikamish was taken the following day, and the rest of the Turkish advance continued unchecked. Throughout October, Armenian resistance progressively collapsed, and the Turkish armies captured Kars on 30 October and occupied Alexandropol, Armenia's largest city at the time, on 6 November.

A ceasefire was concluded on 18 November between Karabekir and a delegation led by Alexander Khatisian. Although Karabekir's terms were extremely harsh, the Armenian delegation had little recourse but to agree to them. Karabekir affixed his signature under the peace agreement, the Treaty of Alexandropol, which was signed on 3 December 1920. Although the treaty was technically invalid, as the government that Khatisian's delegation represented had ceased to exist the previous day, Turkey's territorial gains as stipulated in the treaty were confirmed in the Treaty of Kars of 1921. Karabekir's army displaced and massacred tens of thousands of Armenian civilians during the campaign against Armenia, with conservative estimates placing the number killed at approximately 60,000.

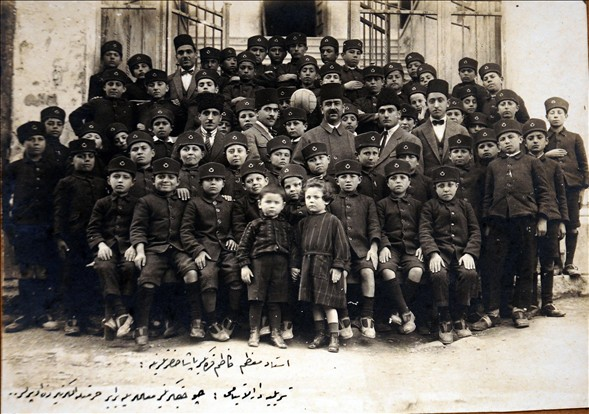
Gürbuz Çocuklar Ordusu

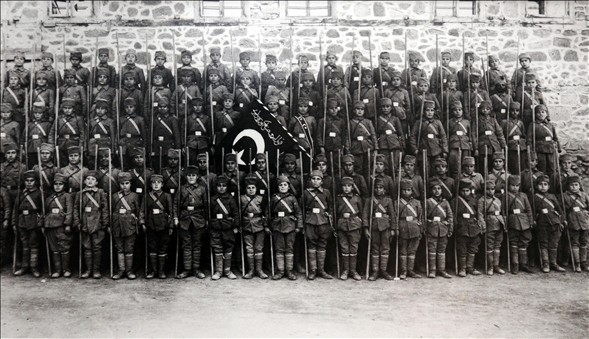
Gürbüz Çocuklar Ordusu, 1919.

In 1924, he was assigned to take Hakkari back. He was designated by the new Grand National Assembly in Ankara to sign also the friendship agreement Treaty of Kars with the Soviet Union on 23 October 1921. He then conquered Hakkari from the Assyrian forces and in the process, massacred and displaced many Assyrians.

== Political career ==
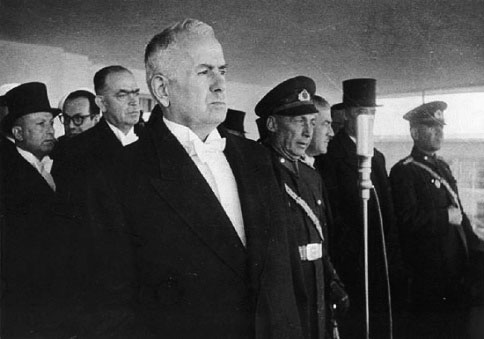
Kâzım Karabekir as the speaker of the Grand National Assembly of Turkey

After the defeat of Greek forces in Western Anatolia, the Republic of Turkey was proclaimed. Kâzım Karabekir Pasha moved to Ankara in October 1922 and continued to serve in the parliament as Deputy of Edirne. He was still the acting commander of the Eastern Army when he was elected Deputy of Constantinople on 29 June 1923. Six months later, he was appointed Inspector of the First Army. He received the highest Turkish award by the parliament, the "Order of Independence" for his meritorious and distinguished service in the military and politics during the War of Independence. He retired from military service in October 1924 and then entered politics.

Karabekir had differences of opinion with Mustafa Kemal about the realization of the Republican reforms, one of the most important being the abolition of caliphate. Even though he agreed with Mustafa Kemal on the subject, he did not agree with him on immediate action. For Karabekir, the timing was inappropriate because British forces stood at the border of southeastern Turkey and claimed Kirkuk, now in Iraq. Karabekir did not believe that the caliphate should be abolished before this was solved. Kurds, more radical in their Shafi Sunni beliefs, began to rise against the government because they thought that the government would abolish religion after it ended the caliphate. Struggling with the rebellion, Turkey agreed to leave Kirkuk to Iraq, which was under the British mandate. Such conflicts prompted tensions between Karabekir and Mustafa Kemal.

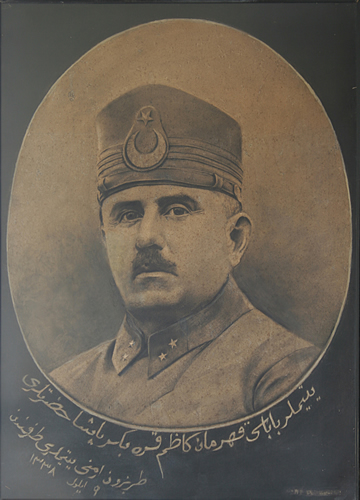
Karabekir's photograph presented by Armenian orphans in Trabizond

On 17 November 1924, several politicians around Karabekir and Ali Fuat Cebesoy founded the Progressive Republican Party (Terakkiperver Cumhuriyet Fırkası), which had several prominent current and former military commanders as its members. Afterwards, the party's recent members were blamed for the Sheikh Said rebellion and the assassination attempt made against Mustafa Kemal in İzmir. The party was closed on 5 June 1925 by the government, and Karabekir was imprisoned by the Independence Tribunals with many of his party members but later acquitted and released. Following those developments, all relations were broken between Karabekir and Mustafa Kemal.

Retiring temporarily from politics, Karabekir devoted himself to writing his memoirs of the Turkish War of Independence and Atatürk's reforms. After Kemal Atatürk died in 1938, Karabekir's close friend İsmet İnönü rehabilitated him.

In 1939, Kâzım Karabekir returned to politics and re-entered parliament as an MP from Istanbul. He was elected speaker of the parliament on 5 August 1946. He died in office at the age of 66 on 26 January 1948 in Ankara after a heart attack. His remains were later relocated to the Turkish State Cemetery in Ankara.

Kâzım Karabekir was survived by his wife İclal and three daughters Hayat, Emel, and Timsal. The four-story mansion in the Erenköy quarter of Kadıköy district in Istanbul, where he lived for almost 15 years, was converted into a museum in 2005.

== Personal views ==
=== Caliphate ===
Rauf Orbay stated that the proclamation of the Turkish Republic was rushed, and the most correct form of government would be the one in which the caliph would preside. While Ali Fuat Cebesoy was agreeing to this view, Kâzım Karabekir told them that he was a supporter of the republic, and was against a personal sultanate.

=== Pan-Turkism ===
The aim of all Turks is to unite with the Turkic borders. History is affording us today the last opportunity. In order for the Muslim world not to be forever fragmented it is necessary that the campaign against Karabagh be not allowed to abate. As a matter of fact drive the point home in Azeri circles that the campaign should be pursued with greater determination and severity.

— Kâzım Karabekir

== Bibliography ==
- Ankara'da Savaş Rüzgarları (Winds of War in Ankara), 448 pp.
- Bir Düello ve Bir Suikast (A Duel and An Assassination), 272 pp. ISBN 975-7369-39-X
- Birinci Cihan Harbi 1–4 (World War I 1–4), 4 books 1320 pp. ISBN 975-7369-21-7
  - Birinci Cihan Harbine Neden Girdik? (Why Did We Enter the World War I?), 199 pp. 1st book ISBN 975-7369-21-7
  - Birinci Cihan Harbine Nasıl Girdik? (How Did We Enter the World War I?), 464 pp. 2nd book ISBN 975-7369-22-5
  - Birinci Cihan Harbini Nasıl İdare Ettik? (How Did We Manage the World War I?), 272 pp. 3rd book ISBN 975-7369-23-3
  - Birinci Cihan Harbini Nasıl İdare Ettik? (How Did We Manage the World War I?), 384 pp. 4th book ISBN 975-7369-24-1
- Cumhuriyet Tarihi Set 1 (History of the Republic Set 1), 13 books
- Cumhuriyet Tarihi Set 2 (History of the Republic Set 2), 12 books
- İstiklal Harbimiz 1–5 (Our War of Independence 1–5), 5 books
- Paşaların Kavgası (Struggle of the Pashas)
- Paşaların Hesaplaşması (Reckoning of the Pashas)
- İzmir Suikastı (Assassination in İzmir)
- Çocuklara Öğütler (Advice to Children)
- Hayatım (My Life)
- İttihat ve Terakki Cemiyeti 1896–1909 (Committee of Union and Progress 1896–1909)
- Ermeni Dosyası (Armenian Dossier)
- İngiltere, İtalya ve Habeş Harbi (British, Italian and Ethiopian War)
- Kürt Meselesi (Kurdish Problem)
- Çocuk, Davamız 1–2 (The Child, Our Problem 1–2), 2 books
- İstiklal Harbimizin Esasları (Principals of Our War of Independence)
- Yunan Süngüsü (Greek Bayonet)
- Sanayi Projelerimiz (Our Industrial Projects)
- İktisat Esaslarımız (Our Principals of Economy)
- Tarihte Almanlar ve Alman Ordusu (Germans in the History and German Army)
- Türkiye'de ve Türk Ordusunda Almanlar (Germans in Turkey and in the Turkish Army)
- Tarih Boyunca Türk-Alman İlişkileri (Turkish-German Relations Throughout the History)
- İstiklal Harbimizde İttihad Terakki ve Enver Paşa 1–2 (Union Progress and Enver Pasha in Our War of Independence)
- İstiklal Harbimizin Esasları Neden Yazıldı? (Why Was the Principals of Our War of Independence Written?)
- Millî Mücadele'de Bursa (Bursa During the War of Independence)
- İtalya ve Habeş (Italy and Ethiopia)
- Ermeni Mezalimi (Armenian Outrage)
- Sırp-Bulgar Seferi (Serbian-Bulgarian Campaign)
- Osmanlı Ordusunun Taarruz Fikri (Attack Concept of the Ottoman Army)
- Erkan-i Harbiye Vezaifinden İstihbarat (Intelligence from the Service at General Staff)
- Sarıkamış, Kars ve Ötesi (Sarıkamış, Kars and Beyond)
- Erzincan ve Erzurum'un Kurtuluşu (Liberation of Erzincan and Erzurum)
- Bulgaristan Esareti - Hatıralar, Notlar (Captivity in Bulgaria - Memories, Notes)
- Nutuk ve Karabekir'den Cevaplar (The Address and Replies From Karabekir)

== See also ==
- List of high-ranking commanders of the Turkish War of Independence

Military offices
Preceded by Nurettin Pasha	Inspector of the First Army; 21 October 1923 – 26 October 1924	Succeeded by Ali Said Pasha (Akbaytogan)
Political offices
Preceded by Mustafa Abdulhalik Renda	Speaker of the Grand National Assembly of Turkey; 5 August 1946 – 26 January 1948	Succeeded by Ali Fuat Cebesoy
