= XV Corps (Ottoman Empire) =

XV Corps On Beşinci Kolordu
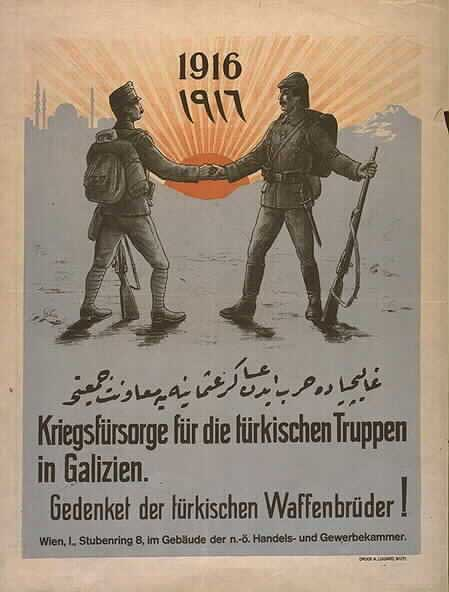
- Active: 1915–2005
- Country: Ottoman Empire (1915–1923); Turkey (1923–2005)
- Type: Corps
- Engagements: Gallipoli Campaign (World War I); Eastern Front (World War I); Brusilov Offensive (Galicia Front)

Commanders
- Notable commanders: Mirliva Weber Pasha (April 4, 1915); Miralay Yakup Şevki Bey (May 3, 1916 – November 18, 1916); Mirliva Cevat Pasha (November 18, 1916 – August 19, 1917); Miralay Ahmet Fevzi Bey; Mirliva Mehmet Ali Pasha; Mirliva Ali Rıza Pasha; Mirliva Kâzım Karabekir Pasha (March 3, 1919 – June 9, 1920)

The XV Corps of the Ottoman Empire (Turkish: 15'inci Kolordu or On Beşinci Kolordu) was one of the corps of the Ottoman Army. It was formed during World War I. It was deployed to Galicia to support Austro-Hungarian forces. Its headquarters were then located at Burshtyn Palace.

480 soldiers of the XV Corps, who fought on the Galicia front and died, are buried at the Budapest Turkish Memorial Cemetery within the New Public Cemetery (Hungarian: Új köztemető) in Budapest, Hungary. Eleven graves are of unknown soldiers.

After the Turkish War of Independence the corps spent decades serving the new Turkish Land Forces as part of the First Army (Turkey) before final disbandment in 2005.

== World War I ==
=== Eastern Front ===
The XV Corps fought with distinction in several engagements. Their first combat engagement was on September 2, 1916. On September 16/17 the Russians attacked the XV Corps with emphasis on the 61st Regiment, but were forced back and counterattacked by the Ottomans. Ottoman casualties on these two days were 7,000 while Russian casualties totaled 15,000-20,000, which stabilized the XV Corps' section of the front for the next two weeks. On September 30 the Russians launched another attack, but were repulsed again; Turkish casualties were 5,000 while Russian casualties were unknown but presumably much higher (10,000+). On October 5/6 the Russians renewed their offensive with a 13-regiment attack on the southern part of the Ottoman line; they took Cevatbey Hill after heavy losses, but were soon forced back again. Ottoman casualties on those two days were 3,000 compared to 12,000 Russian casualties. November and December 1916 passed without any serious fighting with the Russians.

In early November, the tactical situation on the Turkish sector of the front was so favorable that the Germans withdrew their Ledabor detachments. Large-scale Russian attacks occurred throughout December, but the Turks repulsed them without any loss of ground. Turkish casualties were around 3,000 in November and December. Overall losses for 1916 numbered 18,000: 5,000 killed, 10,000 wounded, and 3,000 captured.

Having suffered heavy casualties in September–December 1916, the XV Corps was replenished with fresh troops from Turkey at the start of 1917. The strength of the XV Army Corps rose to 27,031 men with another 5,668 men training in regimental depots by the end of January. The corps was also significantly reinforced with new units which enhanced its fighting efficiency, such as artillery batteries, intelligence and labor detachments, an aircraft company, a balloon detachment, a field bakery company, transportation units and a veterinary hospital. On January 22 successful Turkish commanders and troops were decorated with the German Iron Cross. On 4 February in a show of solidarity, Brigadier General Cevat Paşa paid a visit to Kaiser Wilhelm himself.

On the morning of March 5, 1917, the Russians preluded a three-division attack on a part of the Turkish sector with heavy artillery bombardment. However, the Russians had launched an attack while the XV Corps occupied the very defensible high ground overlooking Zlotalpia River valley and repulsed the Russians. A similar attack was repulsed in April 1917. May passed without further incident, but near the end of June the Russians renewed the offensive. The fighting continued to intensify and on July 1 the Russians attempted to dislodge the Turks with gas shells. By July 11, the fighting had mostly subsided. Russian losses in the June–July offensive were 13,000, while the Turkish losses were reported as 2,550 from June 29 to July 2, 1916 alone. Russian losses in the March and April attacks are unknown.

In early August 1917 the Turkish General Staff decided to withdraw the XV Corps from Galicia and redeploy it to Palestine, and by September 26, 1917 the final units of the XV Corps had been transported to Constantinople. By that time, the XV Army Corps had inflicted well over 72,000 casualties on the opposing Russian forces and held their sector of the line against at least five major attacks, while similarly-sized Austro-Hungarian formations folded to similar attacks around the same time even with German back-up. German General Erich von Falkenhayn claimed in his memoirs that the Turks were "an uncommonly valuable asset to the Southern Army", and allowed the Germans to marshall troops elsewhere in line with their economy of force mission. However, Liman Von Sanders argued that the experienced and well-equipped troops of the XV Corps could've been better used in the Middle Eastern Theater, as in the same year where the XV Corps scored its successes in Galicia, the Ottomans suffered a series of catastrophic defeats against the Russians and British back in their own territory, losing Erzincan in the Caucasus and Gaza in Palestine.

The Ottoman XV Army Corps sustained overall losses of around 25,000 in Galicia.

=== Order of Battle, April 1915 ===
In April 1915, the corps was structured as follows:

- XV Corps (Gallipoli)
  - 3rd Division, 11th Division

=== Order of Battle, August 1916 ===
In August 1916, the corps was structured as follows:

- XV Corps (Galicia, Commander: Miralay Yakup Şevki Bey)
  - 19th Division (Commander: Kaymakam Şefik Bey, Chief of Staff: Binbaşı Lütfü Bey)
    - 57th Infantry Regiment (Commander: Binbaşı Hayri Bey)
    - 72nd Infantry Regiment (Commander: Binbaşı Rıfat Bey)
    - 77th Infantry Regiment (Commander: Kaymakam Saip Bey)
    - Machine Gun Detachments x 2
    - 5th Company of the 4th Cavalry Regiment
    - Artillery Regiment (Commander: Binbaşı Ziya)
      - 2nd Battalion of 25th Artillery Regiment
      - 1st Battalion of 9th Artillery Regiment
    - 4th Engineer Company of 3rd Engineer Battalion
    - 19th Medical Company
    - Signal Detachment
  - 20th Division (Commander: Kaymakam Yasin Hilmi Bey, Chief of Staff: Captain İsmail Hakkı)
    - 61st Infantry Regiment (Commander: Kaymakam Bahaattin Bey)
    - 62nd Infantry Regiment(Commander; Binbaşı Nazmi Bey)
    - 63rd Infantry Regiment (Commander; Binbaşı Ahmet Muhtar Bey)
    - Machine Gun Detachments x 2
    - 6th Company of 12th Cavalry Regiment
    - 20th Artillery Regiment (Commander: Binbaşı Süleyman Avni Bey)
    - 4th Engineer Company of 4th Engineer Battalion

=== Order of Battle, December 1916 ===
In December 1916, the corps was structured as follows:

- XV Corps (Galicia, Commander: Mirliva Cevat Pasha)
  - 19th Division (Commander: Kaymakam Sedat Bey)
  - 20th Division (Commander: Kaymakam Yasin Hilmi Bey)

=== Order of Battle, August 1917 ===
In August 1917, the corps was structured as follows:

- XV Corps (Syria)
  - 19th Division, 20th Division

=== Order of Battle, January 1918, June 1918 ===
In January, June 1918, the corps was structured as follows:

- XV Corps (Anatolia)
  - None

=== Order of Battle, September 1918 ===
In September 1918, the corps was structured as follows:

- XV Corps (Anatolia)
  - 41st Division, 44th Division

== After Mudros ==
=== Order of Battle, November 1918 ===
In November 1918, the corps was structured as follows:

- XV Corps (Anatolia)
  - 41st Division, 44th Division

=== Order of Battle, January 1919 ===
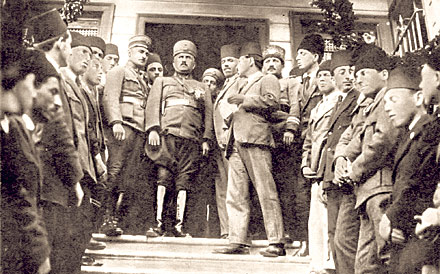
Commander of XV Corps (later Eastern Front of the Army of the Grand National Assembly) Mirliva Kâzım Karabekir Pasha in 1919

In January 1919, the corps was structured as follows:

- XV Corps (Caucasus, Erzurum)
  - 3rd Division (Tortum)
    - 7th Infantry Regiment
    - 8th Infantry Regiment
    - 11th Infantry Regiment
  - 12th Division (Erzurum)
    - 30th Infantry Regiment
    - 35th Infantry Regiment
    - 36th Infantry Regiment
  - 9th Caucasian Division (Hasankale; present day: Pasinler)
    - 17th Infantry Regiment
    - 28th Infantry Regiment
    - 29th Infantry Regiment
  - 11th Caucasian Division (Van)
    - 18th Infantry Regiment
    - 38th Infantry Regiment
    - 34th Infantry Regiment

== After the war ==
It served in various cities and missions during Turkish Republic period. It was stationed in Izmit in 1958. Finally the 15th Corps was disbanded and reformed as 15th Infantry Division in 2005.

== See also ==
- Eastern Front (Turkey)
