= Cavit Erdel =

Military officer of the Ottoman Army and a general of the Turkish Army

Cavit Erdel 1317-P. 14
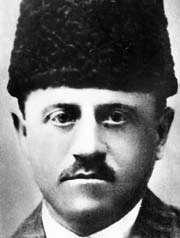
- Born: 1884; Edirne, Adrianople Vilayet, Ottoman Empire
- Died: 5 March 1933 (aged 48–49); Ankara, Turkey
- Burial place: State Cemetery
- Military career
- Allegiance: Ottoman Empire; Turkey
- Service years: Ottoman: 1902–1919; Turkey: 1919 – Mart 5, 1933
- Rank: Mirliva
- Commands: Chief of Staff of the 42nd Division, Chief of Staff of Chataldja Defense Line, Chief of Staff of the IX Corps, 17th Division (deputy), Chief of Staff of the I Caucasian Corps, 11th Caucasian Division; 11th Caucasian Division, Kars Fortified Area Command, chief of the Personnel Bureau of the Ministry of National Defence, 7th Division, 16th Division, member of the Military Supreme Court
- Conflicts: Italo-Turkish War; Balkan Wars; First World War; Turkish War of Independence
- Other work: Member of the GNAT (Kars)

Cavit Erdel (1884 – 5 March 1933) was a military officer of the Ottoman Army and a general of the Turkish Army.

== See also ==
- List of high-ranking commanders of the Turkish War of Independence
