= Turkish invasion of Armenia =

War between Armenian and Turkish forces

- Part of the Eastern Front of the Turkish War of Independence, the 1918–1920 Armenian–Azerbaijani war, and Armenian–Turkish conflict
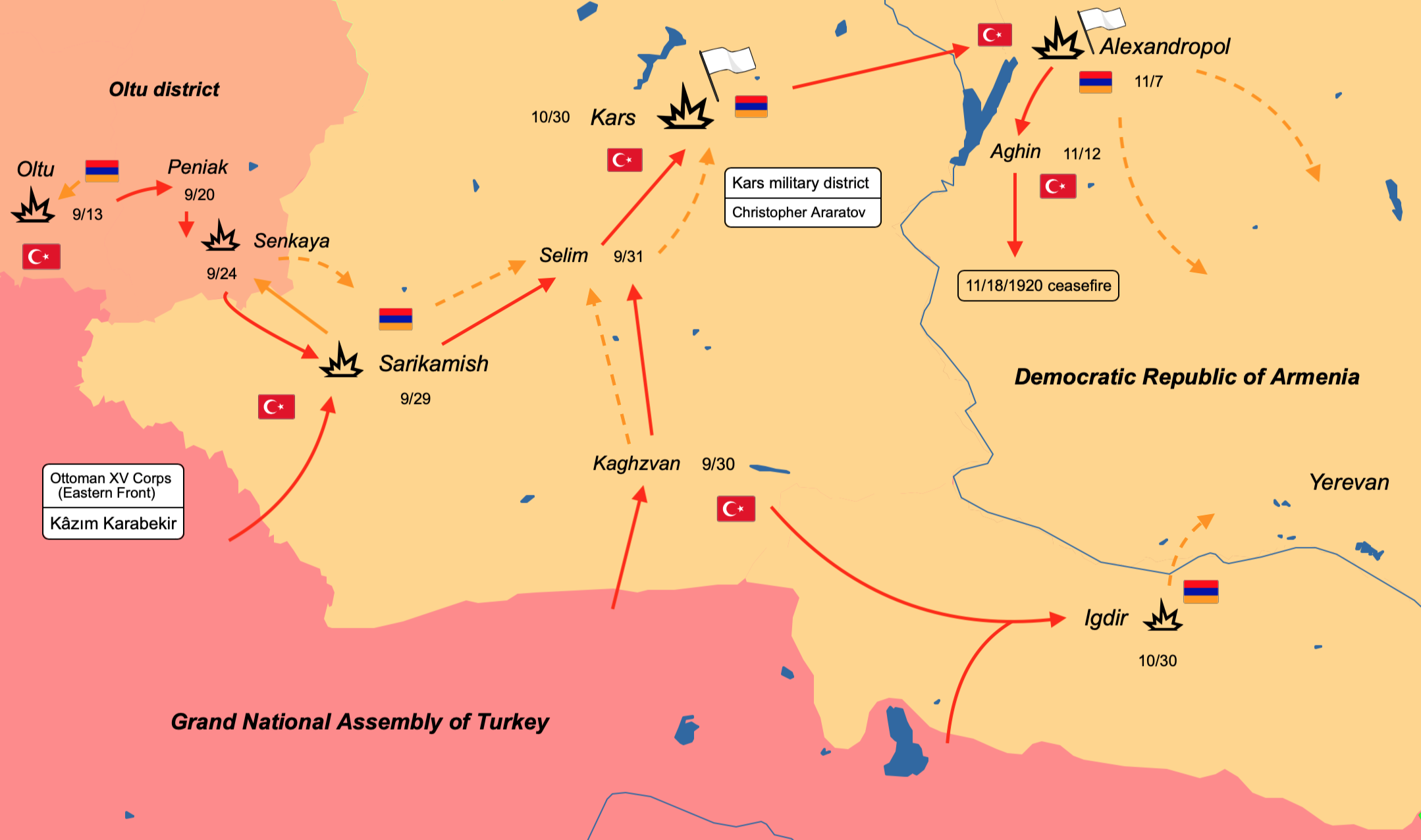
- Turkish advance into the First Republic of Armenia
Date	24 September – 2 December 1920
Location	Armenian highlands
Result	Turkish victory
Territorial changes	Armenia cedes Kars, Ardahan, and Iğdır to Turkey and relinquishes all territory granted to it by the Treaty of Sèvres.

Belligerents
Ankara Government	(First Republic of Armenia) Armenia

Commanders and leaders
Mustafa Kemal Pasha; Kâzım Karabekir; Rüştü Pasha; Osman Koptagel; Cavit Erdel; Kâzım Orbay	(First Republic of Armenia) Drastamat Kanayan; (First Republic of Armenia) Hamo Ohanjanyan; (First Republic of Armenia) Ruben Ter-Minasian; (First Republic of Armenia) Christophor Araratov; (First Republic of Armenia) Movses Silikyan

Units involved
Eastern Front Command: 9th Caucasian Division; 11th Division; 12th Caucasian Division; Attached militia auxilaries	Unknown

Strength
Total: ~25,500 men; • 20,495 regular troops; • 3,500–4,000 tribal auxiliaries; • 1,500 militia	20,000 men

Casualties and losses
43 killed, 76 wounded	1,100+ soldiers killed; 3,000+ prisoners
- 60,000–98,000 or 198,000–250,000 Armenian civilians killed

The Turkish invasion of Armenia, also known as the Turkish–Armenian War and known in Turkey as the Eastern Front (Turkish: Doğu cephesi) of the Turkish War of Independence, was a conflict fought between the recently established First Republic of Armenia and the Turkish National Movement, following the signing of the Treaty of Sèvres in 1920. The treaty transferred vast portions of eastern Anatolia from the Ottoman Empire to Armenia, including the towns of Trabzon, Erzurum and Van. While delegates of the Ottoman government reluctantly signed the treaty following their defeat in World War I, members of the Ottoman parliament refused to ratify it. The treaty greatly angered the Turkish Nationalists, led by Mustafa Kemal Pasha, who refused to recognize it. In September 1920, remnants of the Ottoman Army's XV Corps under the command of Kâzım Karabekir, attacked Western Armenia with direct orders from Mustafa Kemal (Atatürk) to "eliminate Armenia physically and politically".

One estimate places the number of Armenians massacred by the Turkish army during the invasion at 100,000—this is evident in the marked decline (−25.1%) of the population of modern-day Armenia from 961,677 in 1919 to 720,000 in 1920. The Turkish military victory was followed by the Soviet invasion of Armenia and the establishment of the Armenian Soviet Socialist Republic. The Turkish invasion and occupation had drastic humanitarian impacts to Armenia's population, triggering condemnation from German and American officials. According to several historians, only Soviet intervention prevented the completion of the Armenian genocide.

The hostilities ended with the Treaty of Alexandropol and the effective partition of Armenia between Kemalist Turkey and the Soviet Union: most of Western Armenia was transferred to Turkey and Eastern Armenia was incorporated into the Soviet Union as the Armenian Socialist Republic. This status was solidified by the annulment of the Treaty of Sèvres, and the ratification of the Treaty of Moscow (March 1921) and Treaty of Kars (October 1921) between Soviet Russia and the Grand National Assembly of Turkey.

== Background ==
The dissolution of the Russian Empire in the wake of the February Revolution saw the Armenians of the South Caucasus declaring their independence and formally establishing the First Republic of Armenia. In its two years of existence, the republic, with its capital in Yerevan, was beset with a number of debilitating problems, including fierce territorial disputes with its neighbors and a severe refugee crisis.

Armenia's most crippling problem was its dispute with its neighbor to the west, the Ottoman Empire. Approximately 1.5 million Armenians had perished during the Armenian genocide. Although the armies of the Ottoman Empire eventually occupied the South Caucasus in the summer of 1918 and stood poised to crush the republic, Armenia resisted until the end of October, when the Ottoman Empire capitulated to the Allied powers. Though the Ottoman Empire was partially occupied by the Allies, and while being invaded by Franco-Armenian forces during the Cilicia Campaign, the Turks did not withdraw their forces to the pre-war Russo-Turkish boundary until February 1919 and maintained many troops mobilized along this frontier.

== Bolshevik and Turkish nationalist movements ==
During the First World War and in the ensuing peace negotiations in Paris, the Allies had vowed to punish the Turks and reward some, if not all, of the eastern provinces of the empire to the nascent Armenian republic. But the Allies were more concerned with concluding the peace treaties with Germany and the other European members of the Central Powers. In matters related to the Near East, the principal powers, Great Britain, France, Italy, and the United States, had conflicting interests over the spheres of influence they were to assume. While there were crippling internal disputes between the Allies, and the United States was reluctant to accept a mandate over Armenia, disaffected elements in the Ottoman Empire in 1920 began to disavow the decisions made by the Ottoman government in Constantinople, coalesced and formed the Turkish National Movement, under the leadership of Mustafa Kemal Pasha. The Turkish Nationalists considered any partition of formerly Ottoman lands (and subsequent distribution to non-Turkish authorities) to be unacceptable. Their avowed goal was to "guarantee the safety and unity of the country". The Bolsheviks sympathized with the Turkish Movement due to their mutual opposition to "Western Imperialism", as the Bolsheviks referred to it.

In his message to Vladimir Lenin, the leader of the Bolsheviks, dated 26 April 1920, Kemal promised to coordinate his military operations with the Bolsheviks' "fight against imperialist governments" and requested five million lira in gold as well as armaments "as first aid" to his forces. In 1920, the Lenin government supplied the Kemalists with 6,000 rifles, more than five million rifle cartridges, and 17,600 projectiles, as well as 200.6 kg of gold bullion; in the following two years the amount of aid increased. In the negotiations of the Treaty of Moscow (1921), the Bolsheviks demanded that the Turks cede Batum and Nakhichevan; they also asked for more rights in the future status of the Straits. Despite the concessions made by the Turks, the financial and military supplies were slow in coming. Only after the decisive Battle of Sakarya (August–September 1921), the aid started to flow in faster. After much delays, the Armenians received from the Allies in July 1920 about 40,000 uniforms and 25,000 rifles with a great amount of ammunition.

It was not until August 1920 that the Allies drafted the peace settlement of the Near East in the form of the Treaty of Sèvres. Under the terms of the treaty, portions of four northeastern vilayets of the Ottoman Empire were allotted to the First Republic of Armenia and subsequently came to be known as Wilsonian Armenia, after the US President Woodrow Wilson. The Treaty of Sèvres served to confirm Kemal's suspicions about Allied plans to partition the empire. According to historian Richard G. Hovannisian, Kemal's decision to order attacks on Armenian troops in Oltu District in the erstwhile Kars Oblast that eventually expanded into an invasion of Armenia proper was intended to show the Allies that "the treaty would not be accepted and that there would be no peace until the West was ready to offer new terms in keeping with the principles of the Turkish National Pact."

The remnants of the XV Corps of the Ottoman Empire, which was the largest Ottoman force not de-mobilized following the Ottoman surrender, was reorganized as the Eastern Front Command with Karabekir retaining command. In the summer of 1920, before the Turkish offensive, the Eastern Front Command consisted of four divisions with a total strength of around 25,000 troops. Roughly a fifth of the force was made up of tribal and militia auxiliaries, with the enlisted strength of the entire force numbering 20,495. However, Karabekir reported that a total of 30,000 regulars and 20,000 irregular troops could be mobilized through conscription, bringing the potential total to around 50,000 or even 60,000 men.

== Active stage ==
=== Early phases ===
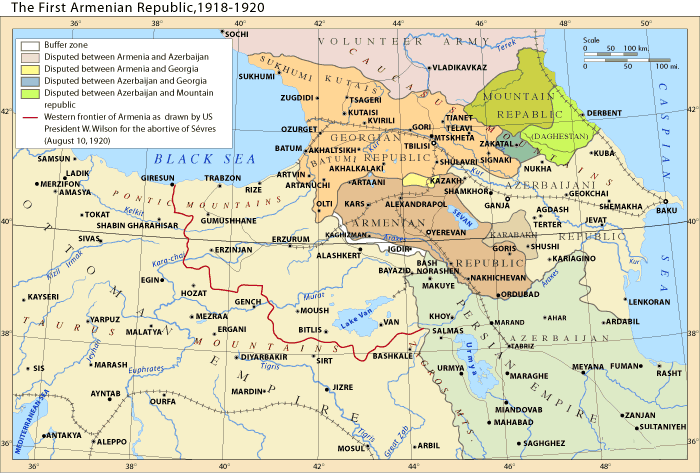
The territory of the Republic of Armenia in 1920.

According to Turkish and Soviet sources, Turkish plans to take back formerly Ottoman-controlled lands in the east were already in place as early as June 1920. Using Turkish sources, historian Bilâl Şamşir has identified mid-June as to when exactly the Ankara government began to prepare for a campaign in the east. Hostilities were first begun by Kemalist forces. Kâzım Karabekir was assigned command of the newly formed Eastern Front on 9 June 1920 and was given authority over a field army and all civil and military officials in the Eastern Front on 13 or 14 June. Skirmishes between Turkish and Armenian forces in the area surrounding Kars were frequent during that summer, although full-scale hostilities did not break out until September. Convinced that the Allies would not come to the defense of Armenia and aware that the leaders of the Republic of Armenia had failed to gain recognition of its independence by Soviet Russia, Kemal gave the order to commanding general Kâzım Karabekir to advance into Armenia. At 2:30 in the morning of 13 September, five battalions from the Turkish XV Army Corps attacked Armenian positions, surprising the thinly spread and unprepared Armenian forces at Oltu and Penek. By dawn, Karabekir's forces had occupied Penek and the Armenians had suffered at least 200 casualties and been forced to retreat east towards Sarıkamış. As neither the Allied powers nor Soviet Russia reacted to Turkish operations, on September 20 Kemal authorized Karabekir to push onwards and take Kars and Kağızman.

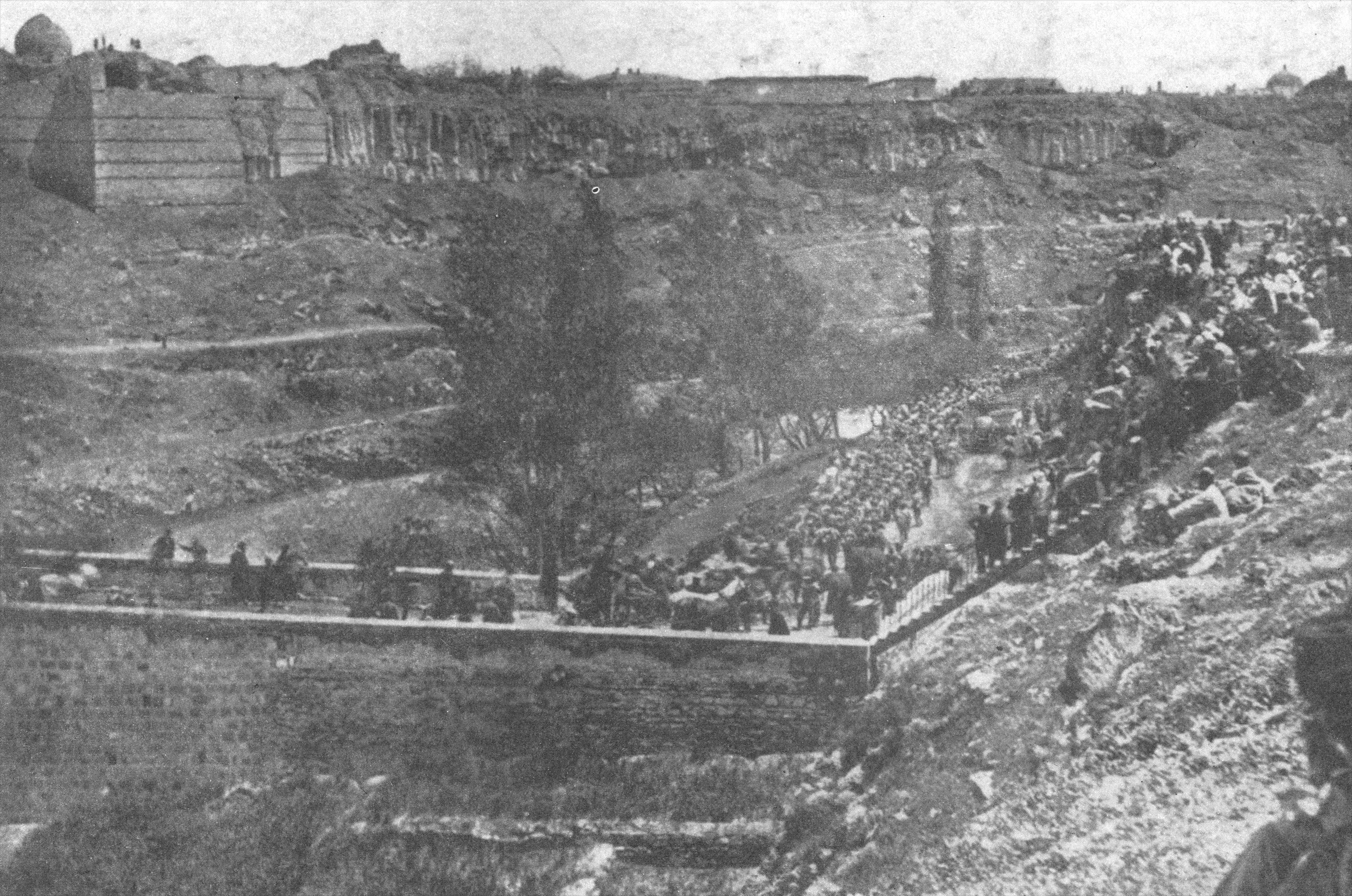
Araratian regiment going to the Turkish–Armenian front, 1920

By this time, Karabekir's XV Corps had grown to the size of four divisions. At 3:00 in the morning of 28 September, the four divisions of the XV Army Corps advanced towards Sarıkamış, creating such panic that Armenian residents had abandoned the town by the time the Turks entered the next day. The armed forces started toward Kars but were delayed by Armenian resistance. In early October, the Armenian government pleaded that the Allies intervene and put a halt to the Turkish advance, but to no avail. Most of Britain's available forces in the Near East were concentrated on crushing the Kurdish tribal uprisings in Iraq with the help of the Assyrians, while France and Italy were also fighting the Turkish revolutionaries near Syria and Italian controlled Antalya. Neighboring Georgia declared neutrality during the conflict.

On 11 October, Soviet plenipotentiary Boris Legran arrived in Yerevan with a text to negotiate a new Soviet-Armenian agreement. The agreement signed on 24 October secured Soviet support. The most important part of this agreement dealt with Kars, which Armenia agreed to secure. The Turkish national movement was not happy with possible agreement between the Soviets and Armenia. Karabekir was informed by the Government of the Grand National Assembly regarding the Boris Legran agreement and ordered to resolve the Kars issue. The same day the agreement between Armenia and Soviet Russia was signed, Karabekir moved his forces toward Kars.

=== Capture of Kars and Alexandropol ===
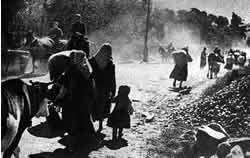
Armenian civilians flee Kars after its capture by Turkish forces

On 24 October, Karabekir's forces launched a new, massive campaign against Kars. The Armenians abandoned the city, which by 30 October came under full Turkish occupation. Turkish forces continued to advance, and, a week after the capture of Kars, took control of Alexandropol (present-day Gyumri, Armenia). On 12 November, the Turks also captured the strategic village of Aghin, northeast of the ruins of the former Armenian capital of Ani, and planned to move toward Yerevan. On 13 November, Georgia broke its neutrality. It had concluded an agreement with Armenia to invade the disputed region of Lori, which was established as a Neutral Zone (the Shulavera Condominium) between the two nations in early 1919.

=== Treaty of Alexandropol ===
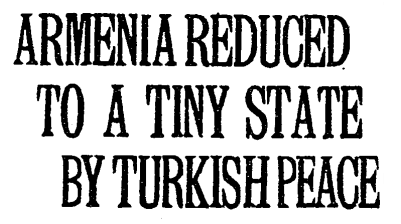
An article from the New York Times, 10 December 1920

The Turks, occupying Alexandropol (today called Gyumri), presented the Armenians with an ultimatum which they were forced to accept. They followed it with a more radical demand which threatened the existence of Armenia as a viable entity. The Armenians at first rejected this demand, but when Karabekir's forces continued to advance, they had little choice but to capitulate. On November 18, 1920, Armenian and Turkish forces concluded a cease-fire agreement. During the invasion the Turkish Army carried out mass atrocities against Armenian civilians in Kars and Alexandropol. These included rapes and massacres where tens of thousands of civilians were executed.

The Armenian delegation led by Khatisyan then signed the Treaty of Alexandropol with Kemalist Turkey on 3 December 1920. The treaty required Armenia to disarm most of its military forces, renounce the Treaty of Sèvres, and cede the entire territory of the former Kars Oblast and the district of Surmalu to Turkey, as well as make territorial concessions to Azerbaijan in Nakhichevan. The decision to sign the illegal treaty was justified by Khatisyan as necessary to prevent Karabekir's army from advancing further and reaching Echmiadzin and Yerevan ahead of the Red Army.

As the terms of defeat were being negotiated between Karabekir and Armenian Foreign Minister Alexander Khatisyan, Joseph Stalin, on the command of Vladimir Lenin, ordered Grigoriy Ordzhonikidze to enter Armenia from Azerbaijan in order to establish a new pro-Bolshevik government in the country. On the night of 28–29 November, the Soviet Eleventh Army under the command of Anatoli Gekker invaded Armenia at Karavansarai (present-day Ijevan), meeting little to no resistance. That same day, the Armenian Revolutionary Committee (a committee of Armenian Bolsheviks formed in Baku a week earlier to facilitate Armenia's sovietization) declared Armenia a Soviet republic. A majority of the Armenian leadership agreed that it was impossible to resist both the Russians and the Turks and that the Armenian army and population were exhausted. Drastamat Kanayan and Hambardzum Terterian were authorized to enter negotiations with Boris Legran to accept Soviet rule in Armenia.

On 2 December 1920, the Armenian government signed an agreement with Legran declaring its resignation and the transfer of power in Armenia to a Soviet government. Drastamat Kanayan would temporarily lead the country pending the arrival of the Armenian Revolutionary Committee in Yerevan. On behalf of Soviet Russia, Legran guaranteed the restoration of Armenia's pre-war borders.

With the mass flight of Armenians from the regions designated for Turkish annexation, Karabekir proposed a plebiscite based on self-determination, echoing the procedure the Ottomans had used to legitimize the seizure of Kars after the Treaty of Brest-Litovsk. Karabekir initially attempted to include text in the treaty that claimed that Armenians had never formed a majority in any part of the Ottoman Empire.

== Impact ==
The Turkish invasion and occupation had drastic humanitarian impacts: 200 villages were plundered of agricultural equipment and humanitarian supplies, with 12,000 people taken away as slaves, and crops seized or allowed to rot in the fields, leading to a catastrophic famine-ridden winter between 1918-1919 where 500,000 Armenians were left destitute, and 180,000 thousand Armenians died from starvation, corresponding to one-fifth of the population of the new Armenian republic. Shocked by the scale of the killings and starvation, American officials urged President Wilson to withdraw Article 12 of the Peace Declaration unless Turkey stopped the massacres in the Caucasus. A German government report stated "the Armenians were subjected to indescribable tortures; children were put in sacks and thrown into the sea. The old men and women were crucified and mutilated, all the young girls and women were handed over to the Turks."

Around 60,000 Armenians were killed by Turkish forces and 38,000 wounded, with 16,000 of 18,000 prisoners perishing through execution, starvation, or exposure, and only 2,000 surviving. In 1919, over 130,000 Armenians and Yazidis lived in the Surmalu and Kars regions (present-day Turkish provinces of Iğdır, Kars, and Ardahan), but after the 1920 Turkish occupation, massacres, and expulsions, fewer than half—about 59,800—reached the new Armenian republic as refugees.

A commission investigating atrocities committed by the Turkish invaders in Shirak reported that 11,886 corpses were buried, of whom 90 percent were women and children and 10 percent were men. In Agbulag, 1,186 were killed; in Ghaltakhchi, 2,100; in Karaboya, 1,100; and in three villages where refugees from Kars had gathered, 7,500 people were massacred.

The academic Pamela Steiner wrote, "it seems that the Ottomans could not even tolerate the presence of the Armenian people living in any part of their Transcaucasian homeland." Historian Robin Cohen states during this period, "the Armenians hung on for 'grim death' " but by the end of 1920, they were only left with Soviet Armenia which comprised 10% of the Armenian homeland.

== Sovietization and partition of the First Republic of Armenia ==
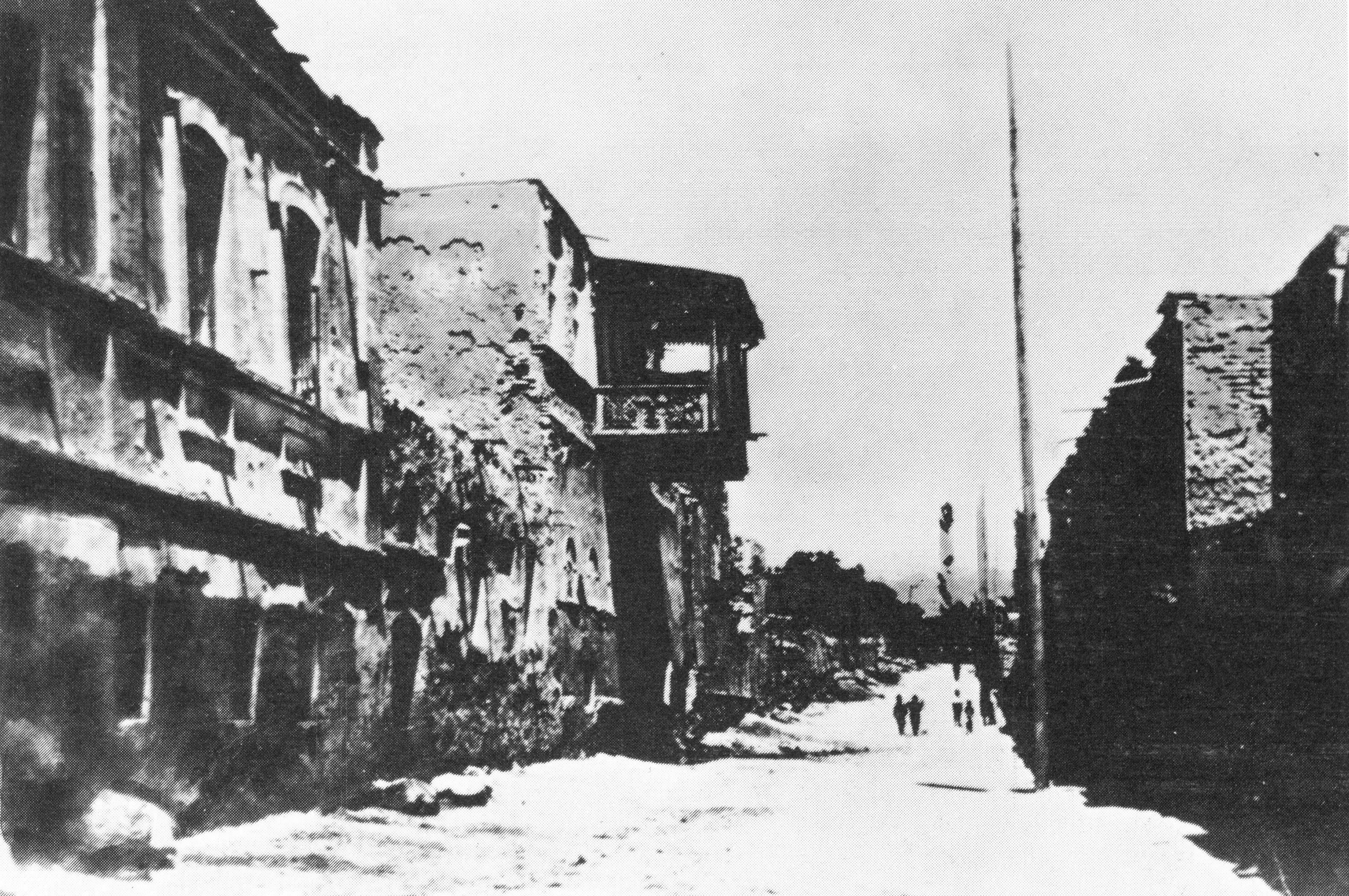
Destroyed Yerevan after Turkish-Armenian war, 1920

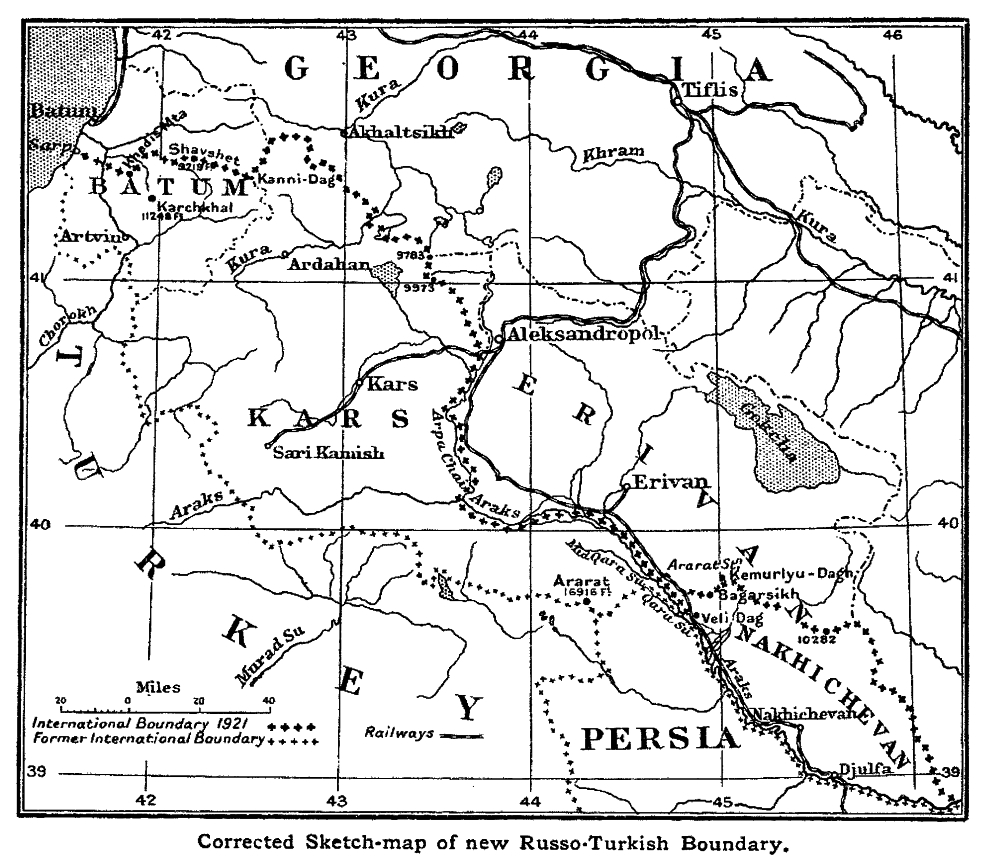
The Soviet-Turkish frontier established in the Treaty of Kars.

The Turkish military victory was followed by the Soviet invasion of Armenia and the establishment of the Armenian Soviet Socialist Republic. According to several historians, only Soviet intervention prevented the completion of the Armenian genocide.

The Red Army entered Yerevan on 4 December 1920 and formally transferred state authority to the communist Revolutionary Committee. Finally, on 6 December, the Cheka, Soviet Russia's secret police, entered Yerevan. Though nominally an independent Soviet republic, Armenia effectively ceased to exist as an independent state. Reneging on their agreement not to subject members of the former ruling party, the Armenian Revolutionary Federation, to repressions, the new Soviet Armenian authorities arrested numerous members of the ARF and conducted expropriations in the countryside, triggering an anti-Bolshevik uprising in February 1921, during which Soviet power was briefly overthrown in Armenia. The Red Army intervened to restore Soviet authority, although anti-Bolshevik resistance continued in the southern region of Zangezur until July 1921.

=== Settlement ===
The warfare in Transcaucasia was settled in a friendship treaty between the Grand National Assembly of Turkey (GNAT) (which proclaimed the Turkish Republic in 1923), and Soviet Russia (RSFSR). The "Treaty on Friendship and Brotherhood", called the Treaty of Moscow, was signed on 16 March 1921. The succeeding Treaty of Kars, signed by the representatives of Azerbaijan SSR, Armenian SSR, Georgian SSR, and the GNAT, ceded Adjara to Soviet Georgia in exchange for the Kars territory (today the Turkish provinces of Kars, Iğdır, and Ardahan). Under the treaties, an autonomous Nakhichevan oblast was established under Azerbaijan's protectorate. The Treaty of Kars effectively confirmed Armenia's territorial losses to Turkey as stipulated by the invalid Treaty of Alexandropol and established the Armenia–Turkey border that exists to this day.

The invasion resulted in Turkey reacquiring most of Western Armenia: territory which had been controlled by the Ottoman Empire prior to the Russo-Turkish War of 1877–1878 and which was subsequently ceded by Soviet Russia as part of the Treaty of Brest-Litovsk.

== See also ==
- Armenia–Turkey border
- Turkish invasion of Georgia
- Greco-Turkish War (1919–1922)
- Caucasus campaign
