= Karmrashen =

Karmrashen may refer to:

- Karmrashen, Vayots Dzor, a village in Vayots Dzor, Armenia.
- Karmrashen, Aragatsotn, a village in Aragatsotn, Armenia.
- Karmrashen (former village), an abandoned village in Aragatsotn, Armenia.
- Karakert, a village in Armavir, Armenia, formerly known as Karmrashen.
- Khrber: ruins of a medieval fortified town also known as Karmrashen in Gegharkunik, Armenia.
