= Kamyshlu =

Kamyshlu is the name of two towns in Armenia:

- Kamyshlu, Armavir
- Kamyshlu, Gegharkunik
