= Lerrnakert =

Lerrnakert or Lernakert may refer to:

- Lernakert, Gegharkunik, Armenia
- Lernakert, Shirak, Armenia
