= Karmrashen, Aragatsotn =

Karmrashen Կարմրաշեն
- Location within Armenia Location within Aragatsotn
- Coordinates: 40°26′10″N 43°56′43″E
- Country: Armenia
- Province: Aragatsotn
- Municipality: Talin

Population (2011)
  - Total: 632
- Time zone: UTC+4
  - Summer (DST): UTC+5

Karmrashen (Armenian: Կարմրաշեն) is a village in the Talin Municipality of the Aragatsotn Province of Armenia. The village is home to the Saint Astvatsatsin Church of 1865, a rock cut shrine, ruins of a fortress, and several khachkars.

== History ==
In World War I, during the Battle of Sardarabad, Karmrashen (then called Kirmizlu) was a site of military activity. It was passed through by Armenian forces on 27-28 May 1918 to rapidly penetrate into Sogyutlu.

== Demographics ==
In 2001, Karmrashen had a de jure population of 634, consisting of 308 males and 326 females. However, its de facto population was lower, laying at 582, consisting of 267 males and 315 females.
