= Rüştü Pasha =

Officer of the Ottoman Army and a general of the Turkish Army

Rüştü Pasha 1309-Top (Artillery) 8
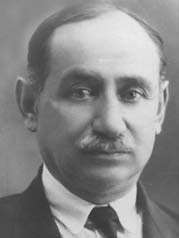
- Born: 1872; Erzurum, Ottoman Empire
- Died: July 13, 1926 (aged 54); İzmir, Turkey
- Military career
- Allegiance: Ottoman Empire; Turkey
- Service years: Ottoman Empire: 1893–1919; Turkey: 1919 – July 13, 1926
- Rank: Mirliva
- Commands: 9th Caucasian Division; 3rd Caucasian Division, 9th Caucasian, IX Corps (deputy)
- Conflicts: Balkan Wars; World War I Turkish War of Independence
- Other work: Member of the GNAT (Erzurum)

Rüştü Pasha or Rushdi Pasha (Turkish: Rüştü Paşa, 1872 – July 13, 1926) was an officer of the Ottoman Army and a general of the Turkish Army. He became a leader of the Progressive Republican Party, being a member of its Central Administrative Committee. He was hanged for his involvement in the İzmir assassination attempt against Mustafa Kemal (Atatürk) in 1926.

== Medals and decorations ==
- Order of the Medjidieh 5th and 3rd Class
- Gallipoli Star (Ottoman Empire)
- Silver Medal of Liyaqat
- Silver Medal of Imtiyaz
- Gold Medal of Liyaqat
- Prussia Order of the Crown (Prussia)
- Medal of Independence with Red Ribbon

== See also ==
- List of high-ranking commanders of the Turkish War of Independence
