= Artashar =

Village in Armavir, Armenia

Artashar Արտաշար
- Location within Armenia
- Coordinates: 40°06′33″N 44°10′52″E
- Country: Armenia
- Marz (Province): Armavir

Population (2011)
  - Total: 1,218
- Time zone: UTC+4 ( )
  - Summer (DST): UTC+5 ( )

Artashar (Armenian: Արտաշար) is a village in the Armavir Province of Armenia. Today, almost 42% (around 511 individuals) of the population are Yazidi Kurds.
