= Partizak =

Partizak Պարտիզակ
- Location within Armenia Location within Aragatsotn
- Coordinates: 40°17′N 44°00′E
- Country: Armenia
- Province: Aragatsotn
- Municipality: Talin

Population (2011)
  - Total: 323
- Time zone: UTC+4
  - Summer (DST): UTC+5

Partizak (Armenian: Պարտիզակ) is a village in the Talin Municipality of the Aragatsotn Province of Armenia.
