= Kosh, Armenia =

Kosh Կոշ
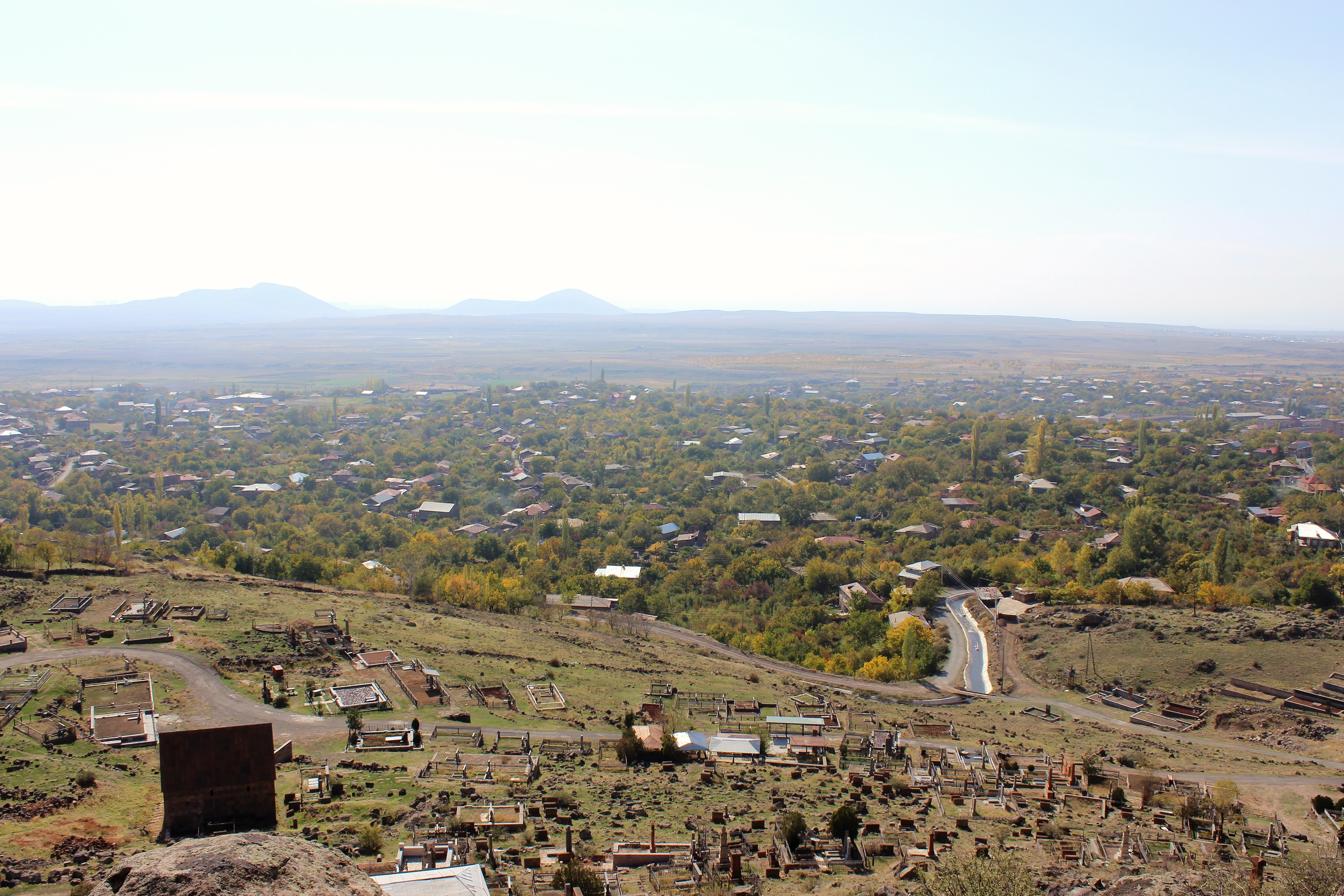
- The village of Kosh as viewed from Kosh Berd.

- Location within Armenia Location within Aragatsotn
- Coordinates: 40°17′55″N 44°09′15″E
- Country: Armenia
- Province: Aragatsotn
- Municipality: Ashtarak

Population (2011)
  - Total: 2,513
- Time zone: UTC+4
  - Summer (DST): UTC+5

Kosh (Armenian: Կոշ) is a village in the Ashtarak Municipality of the Aragatsotn Province of Armenia, 18 km south-west of the district centre Ashtarak. The town is attested as Kvash in early Christian times. In the town are ruins of a 13th-century church - Saint Grigor - and a castle which has yielded Hellenistic pottery remains. There are numerous remains from early Iron Age residential ruins and buildings of large basalt stone blocks.

== Gallery ==
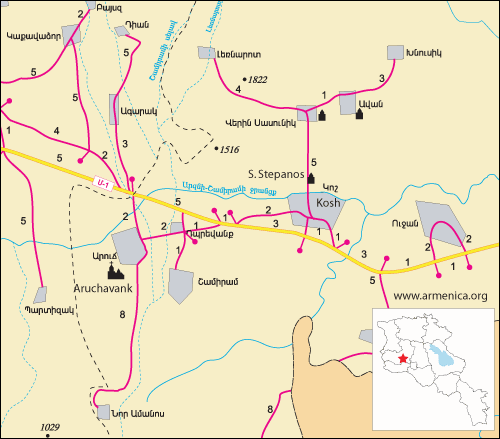
Map of Kosh and the surrounding region.

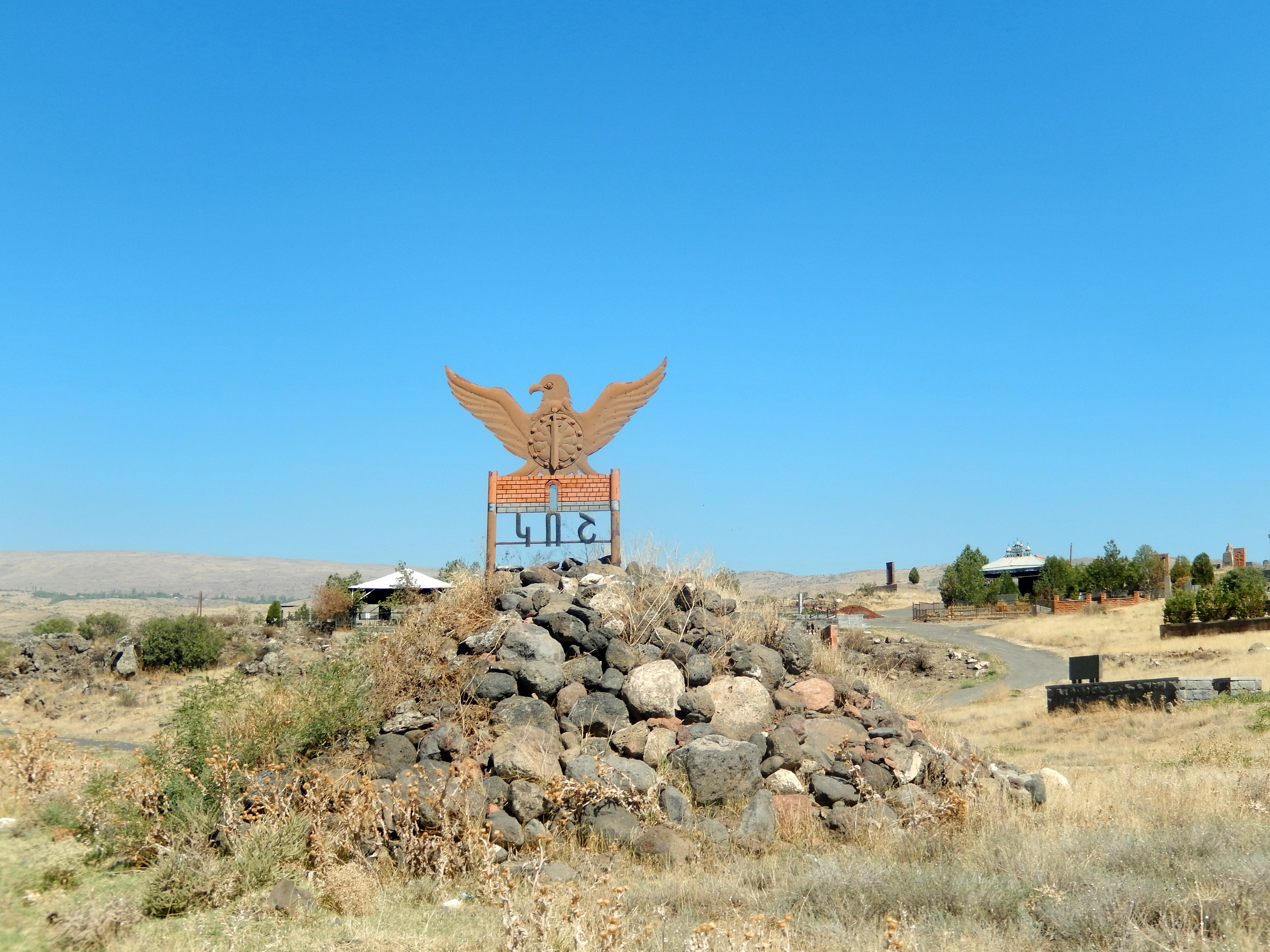

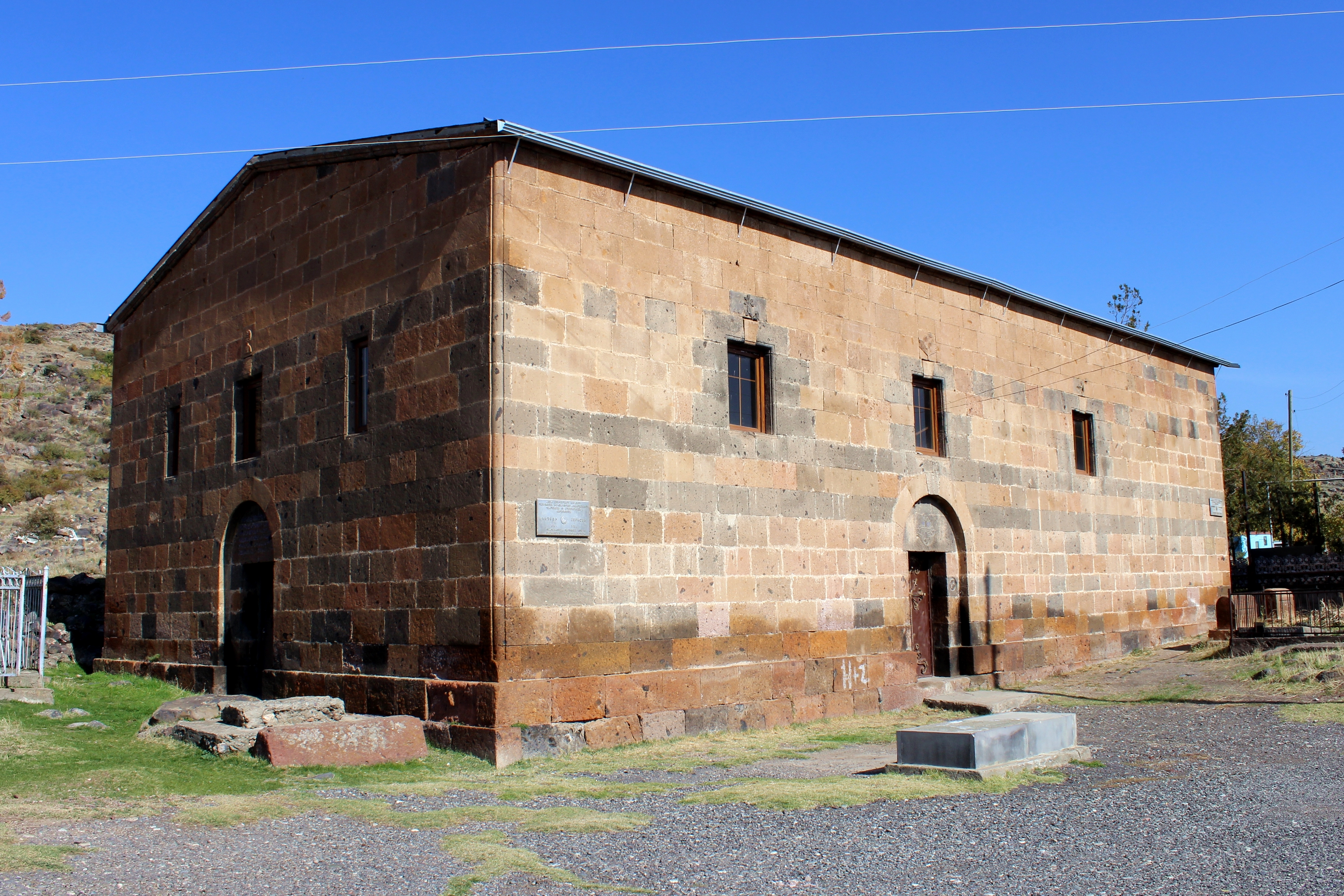
St. Gevorg church of the 19th century

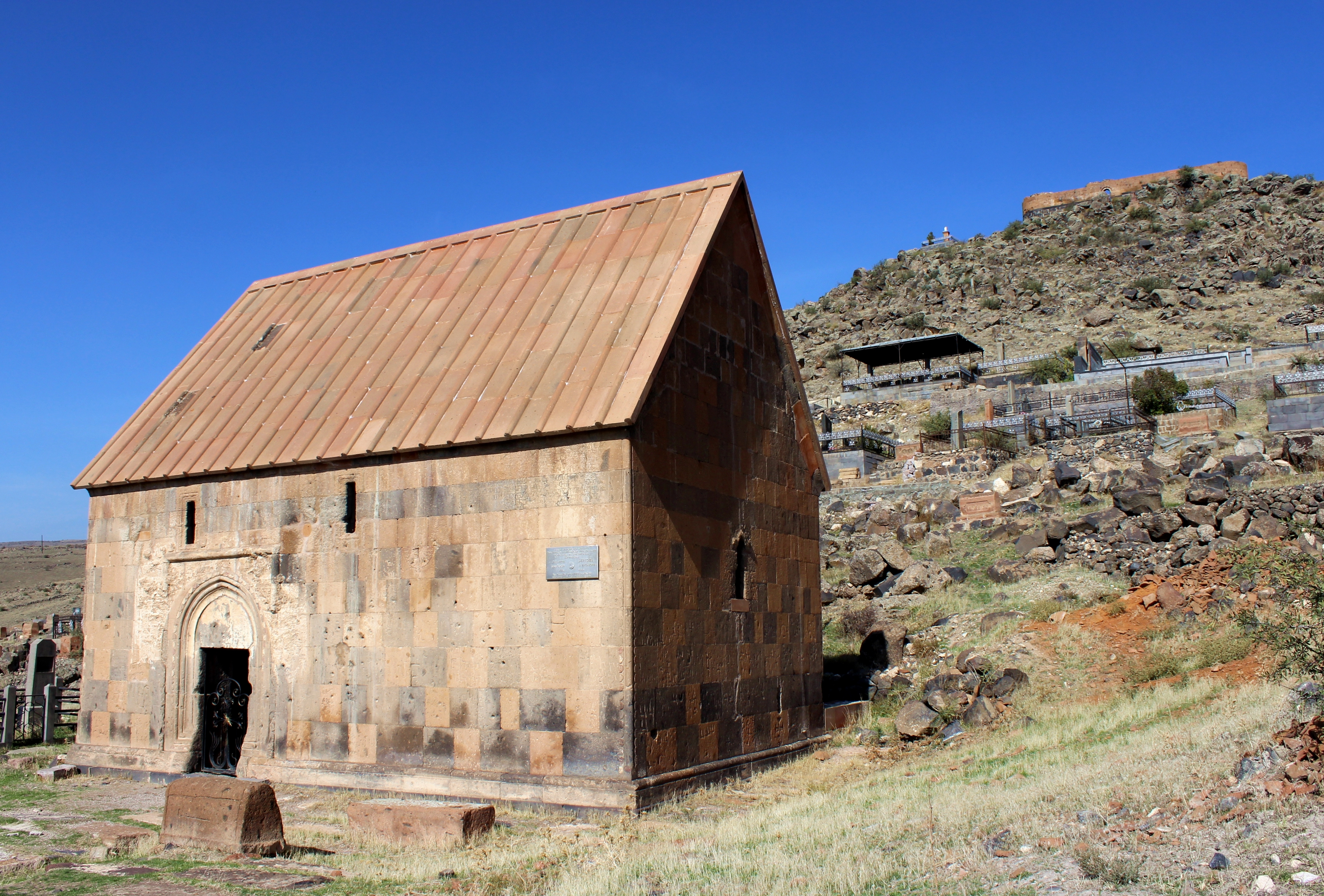
Kosh Berd (13th century) atop a hill beyond the village cemetery, with the church of St. Grigor (13th century, foreground).

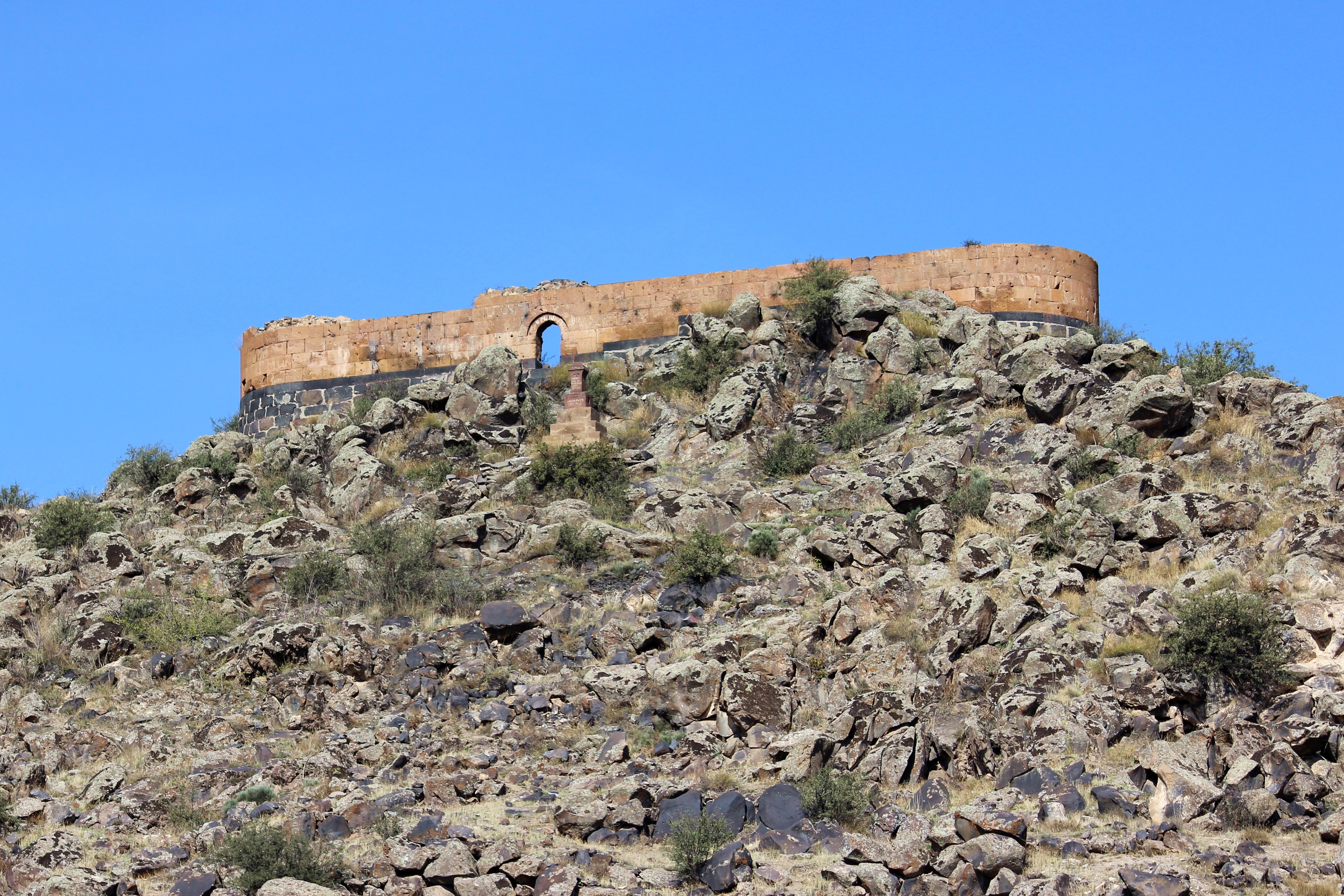
Kosh Berd on a hilltop above the cemetery, 13th century

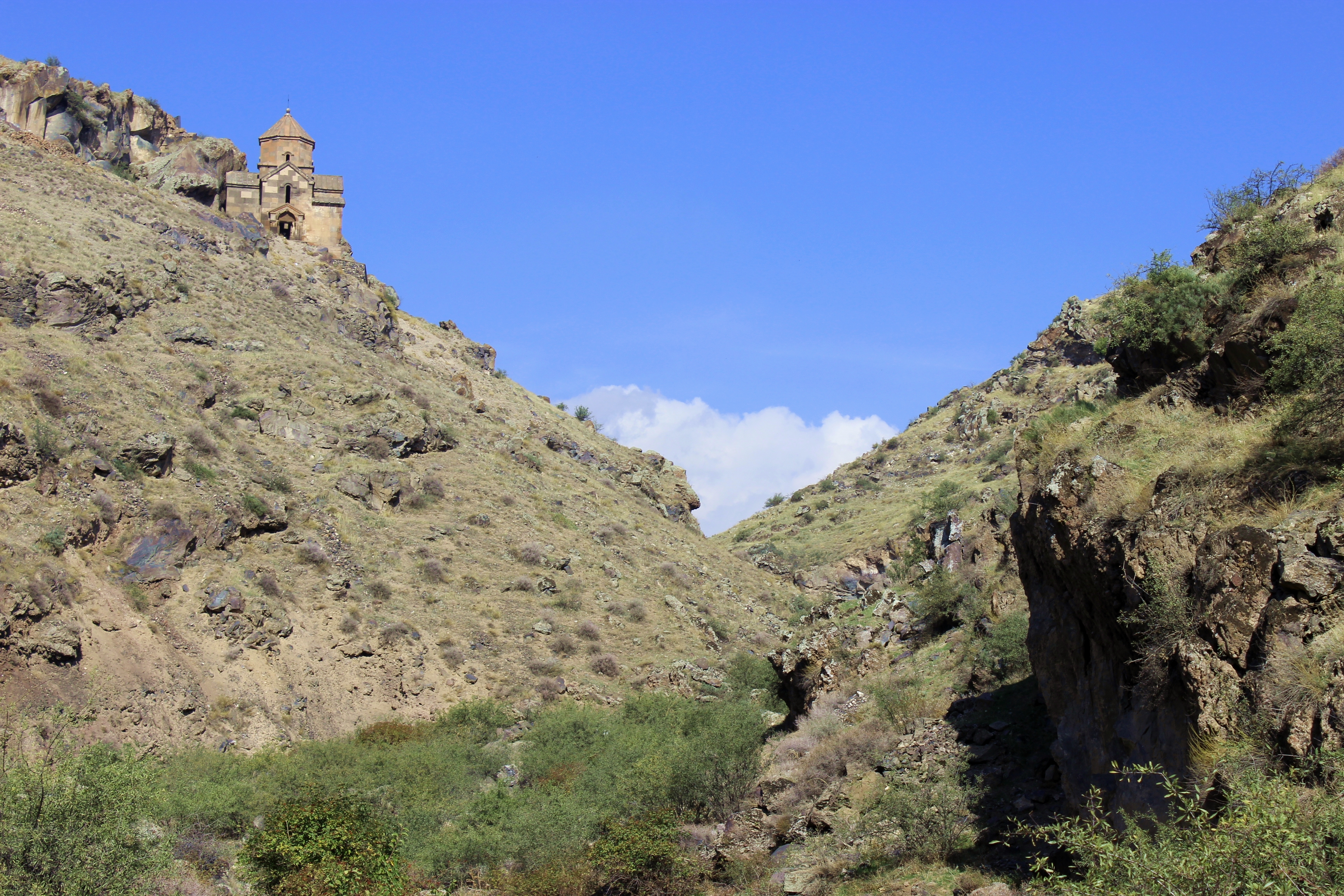
Church of St. Stepanos of the 7th century in the gorge near Kosh.

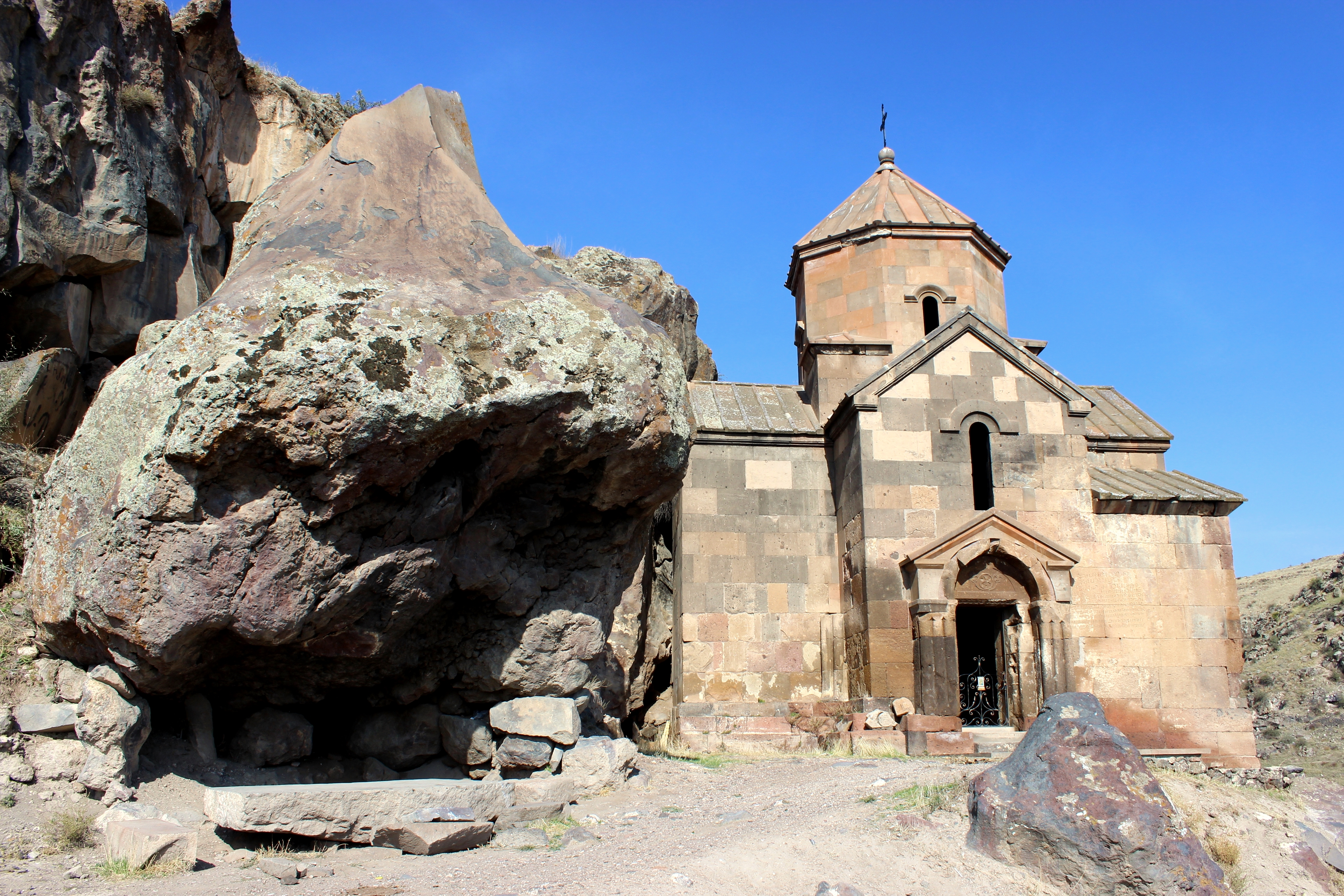
Church of St. Stepanos, 7th century

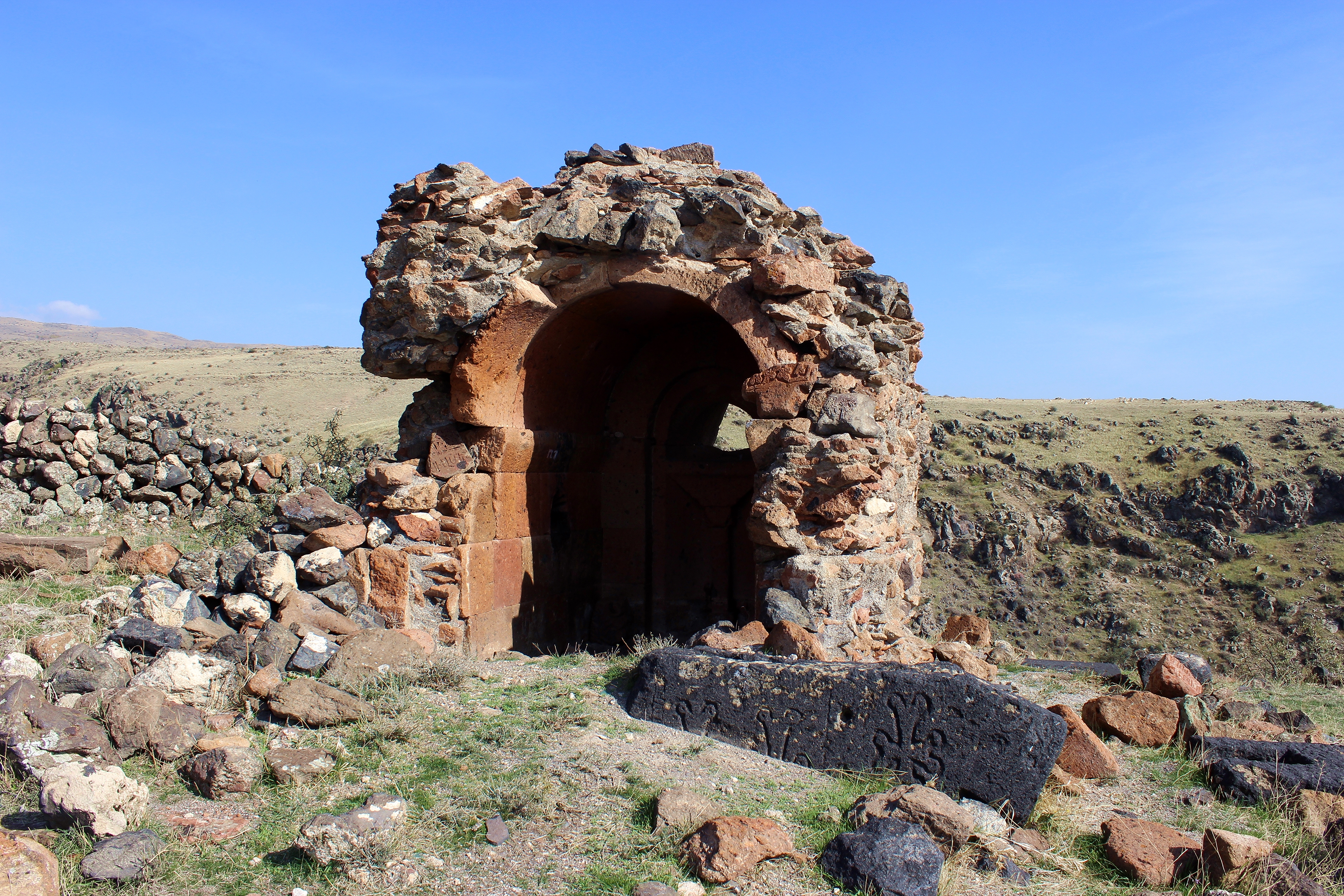
Ruins of the hilltop chapel near the church of St. Stepanos.

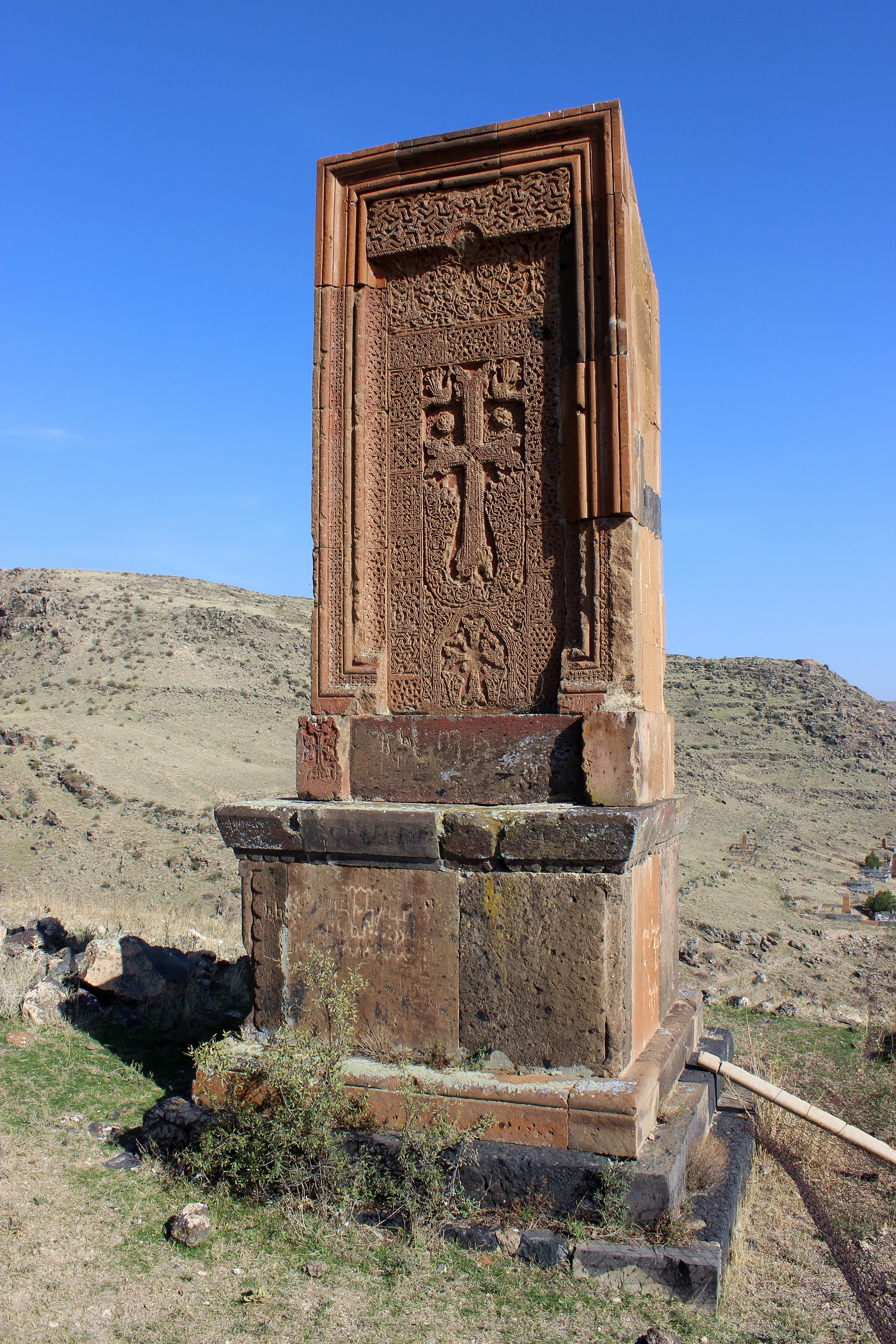
Khachkar monument of 1175 at the hilltop cemetery.
