= Aragats, Armavir =

Village in Armavir, Armenia

Aragats Արագած
- Location within Armenia
- Coordinates: 40°13′06″N 44°13′58″E
- Country: Armenia
- Marz (Province): Armavir Province

Population (2011)
  - Total: 2,924
- Time zone: UTC+4 ( )
  - Summer (DST): UTC+5 ( )

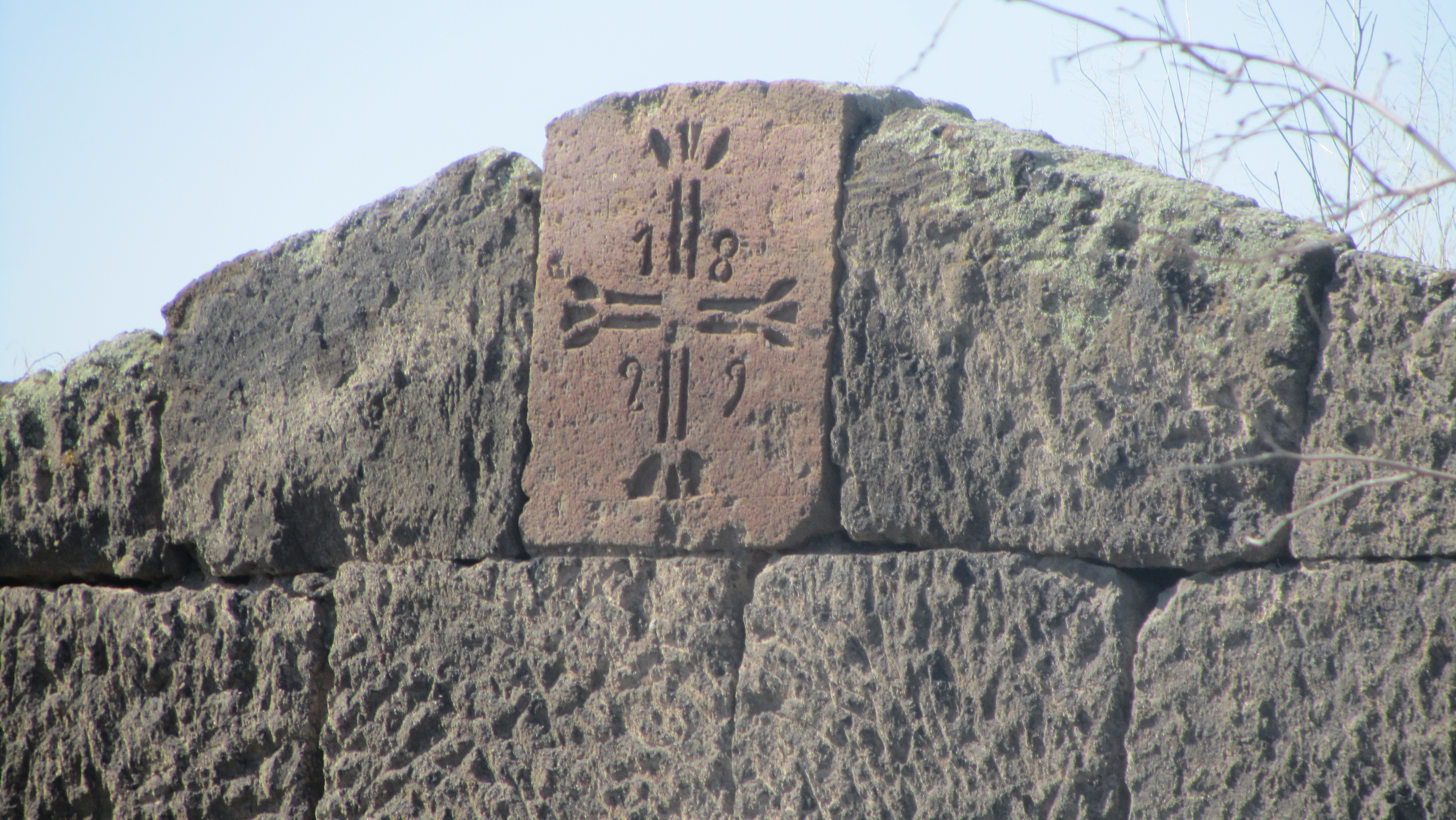

Aragats (Armenian: Արագած), is a village in the Armavir Province of Armenia. The village's church, dedicated to Saint Stepanos, dates to 1870. There is a Urartian fortress nearby.

== See also ==
- Armavir Province
