= Aniavan =

Aniavan Անիավան
- Village
- Location within Armenia Location within Shirak
- Coordinates: 40°28′00″N 43°38′30″E
- Country: Armenia
- Province: Shirak
- Municipality: Ani

Area
  - Total: 87 km^{2} (34 sq mi)
- Elevation: 1,420 m (4,660 ft)

Population (2011)
  - Total: 331
- Time zone: UTC+4
  - Summer (DST): UTC+5
- Area code: +374 242

Aniavan (Armenian: Անիավան is a village in the Ani Municipality of the Shirak Province of Armenia. The Statistical Committee of Armenia reported its population was 516 in 2010, up from 377 at the 2001 census.

== Demographics ==
The population of the village since 1926 is as follows:

Historical population
Year	Pop.	±% p.a.
1926	66	—
1939	249	+10.75%
1959	386	+2.22%
1966	569	+5.70%
1970	460	−5.18%
2001	393	−0.51%
2011	331	−1.70%
