= Ferik, Armenia =

Village in Armavir, Armenia

Ferik Ֆերիկ
- Location within Armenia
- Coordinates: 40°11′11″N 44°12′34″E
- Country: Armenia
- Marz (Province): Armavir

Population (2022)
  - Total: 349
- Time zone: UTC+4 ( )

Ferik (Armenian: Ֆերիկ), is a village in the Armavir Province of Armenia. It is named in honor of poet Ferik Polatbekov. Almost 82% (around 254 individuals) of the population are from the Yazidi minority.

== See also ==
- Armavir Province
- Yazidis in Armenia
