= Alexandre Constantinovich Chnéour =

Alexandre Constantinovich (or Konstantinovitsch) Chnéour (he signed Schneeur on some articles written in German) (August 30, 1884, Saint Petersburg - September 16, 1977, San Francisco) was a Russian entomologist and herpetologist.

As a young man, Chnéour had an early passion for butterflies. After travelling in Germany and in Switzerland, he studied at the Gurevich School of St. Petersbourg and then at the Mihailovsky Artillery School. He left there with the rank of lieutenant and became an officer in a mobile unit artillery.

Decorated at the very start of the First World War, he joined the Russian Air Force in 1916 and started a short career in aviation. He supplemented his military training with studies at the Military Academy.

During the Soviet Revolution of 1917, Chnéour joined the anticommunist White Army and served with the Armenian army in 1918-1919. He later joined the forces of General Anton Denikin. He was evacuated to the Gallipoli camp in Turkey and went to Bulgaria where he gave courses in a military academy of engineering to members of the White Army. He settled in Lyon and then, in 1929, in Tunisia, where he worked as a cartographer.

Chnéour started writing on the butterflies of Tunisia in 1934 and published six articles in German under the name Schneeur between 1934 and 1937. Until 1956, he regularly published articles on the butterflies of Tunisia. With N Chpakowsky, he also published an article on the snakes of Tunisia.

Chnéour had to leave Tunisia at the time of its independence in 1956 and emigrated to the United States with his collection. He lived initially in New York where, with the American Museum of Natural History, he checked the identification of his Tunisian captures. He was then injured by a fall in the library where he worked. Chnéour next settled in California and gave his collections to the California Academy of Sciences. At the age of 90 years he was wounded by a burglar and had to be hospitalized.

== Sources ==
- Paul H. Arnaud Jr (2001), Obituary: Alexandre Constantinovich Chnéour (Schneeur) (1887-1977). Myia, 6: 205-212. - the author quotes a complete bibliography of Chénour as well as the list of taxa which were dedicated to him.
