= Kamyshlu, Gegharkunik =

Kamyshlu
- Location within Armenia Location within Gegharkunik
- Coordinates: 40°11′N 45°40′E
- Country: Armenia
- Marz (Province): Gegharkunik
- Time zone: UTC+4 ( )
  - Summer (DST): UTC+5 ( )

Kamyshlu (also, Kanli) is a town in the Gegharkunik Province of Armenia.

== See also ==
- Gegharkunik Province
