= Bambakashat =

Village in Armavir, Armenia

Bambakashat Բամբակաշատ
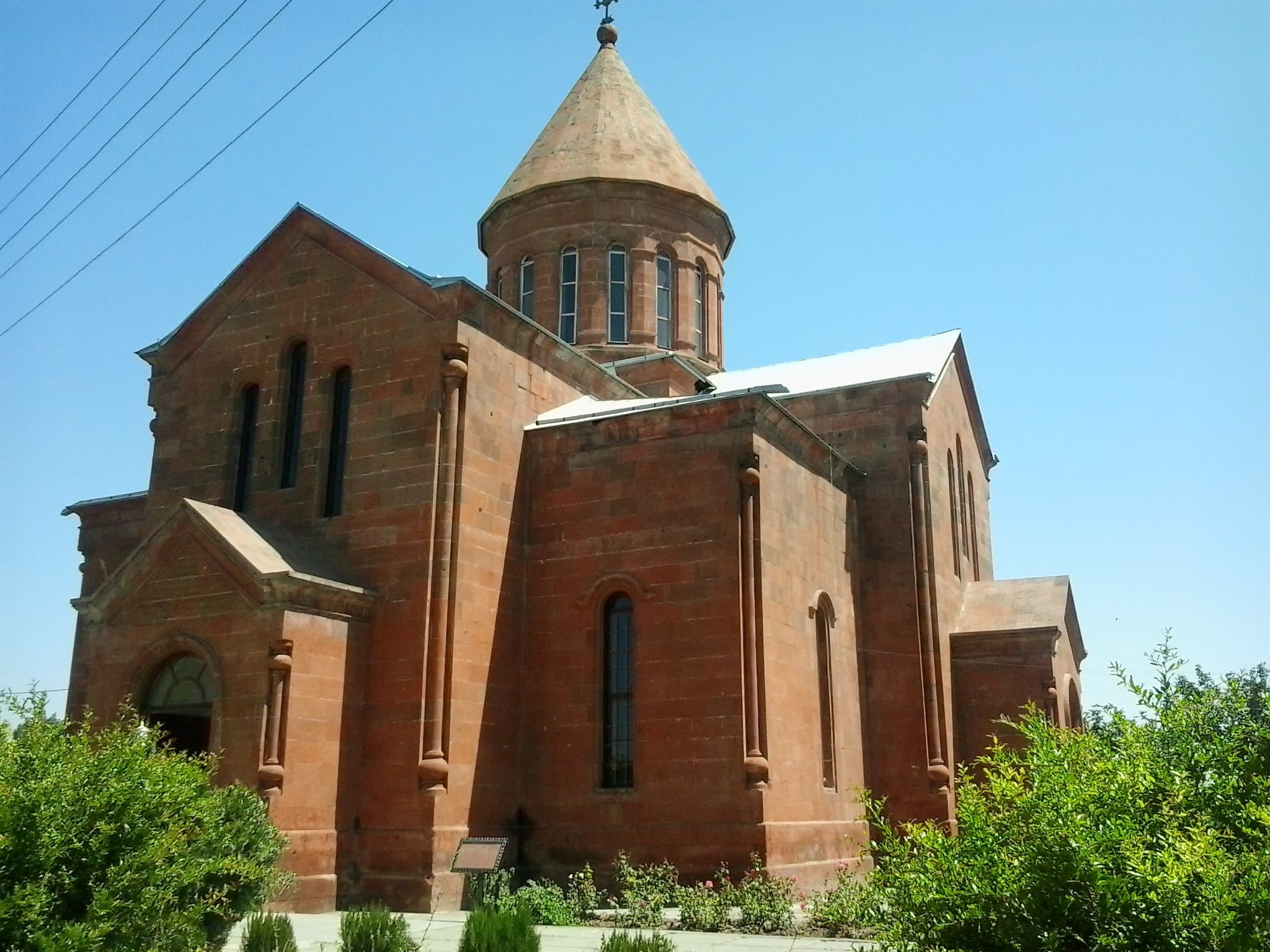
- The church of Bambakashat

- Location within Armenia
- Coordinates: 40°06′52″N 44°00′44″E
- Country: Armenia
- Marz (Province): Armavir

Population (2011)
  - Total: 3,110
- Time zone: UTC+4 ( )
  - Summer (DST): UTC+5 ( )

Bambakashat (Armenian: Բամբակաշատ – meaning "plenty of cotton"); is a village in the Armavir Province of Armenia.

The Church of the Holy Mother of God in Bambakashat was built between 1901 and 1914 replacing a 17th-century wooden chapel. It was consecrated by Catholicos Mkrtich Khrimian in 1914. During the Soviet period, the church was used as warehouse for chemicals. In 1987, the church was reopened by the efforts of Catholicos Vazgen I. It was entirely renovated in 1991 and became the seat of the Armavir diocese on 30 May 1996. The church was the seat of the Armavir Diocese of the Armenian Apostolic Church before moving to the Holy Mother of God Church in Vagharshapat.

== People ==
- Ara Vardanyan, silver medalist at the 1998 World Weightlifting Championships
- Mikhail Aloyan, professional boxer, Olympic bronze medalist and 2-time world champion

== See also ==
- Armavir Province
