= Getashen, Armavir =

Village in Armavir, Armenia

Getashen Գետաշեն
- Location within Armenia
- Coordinates: 40°02′36″N 43°56′41″E
- Country: Armenia
- Marz (Province): Armavir

Population (2011)
  - Total: 2,137
- Time zone: UTC+4 ( )
  - Summer (DST): UTC+5 ( )

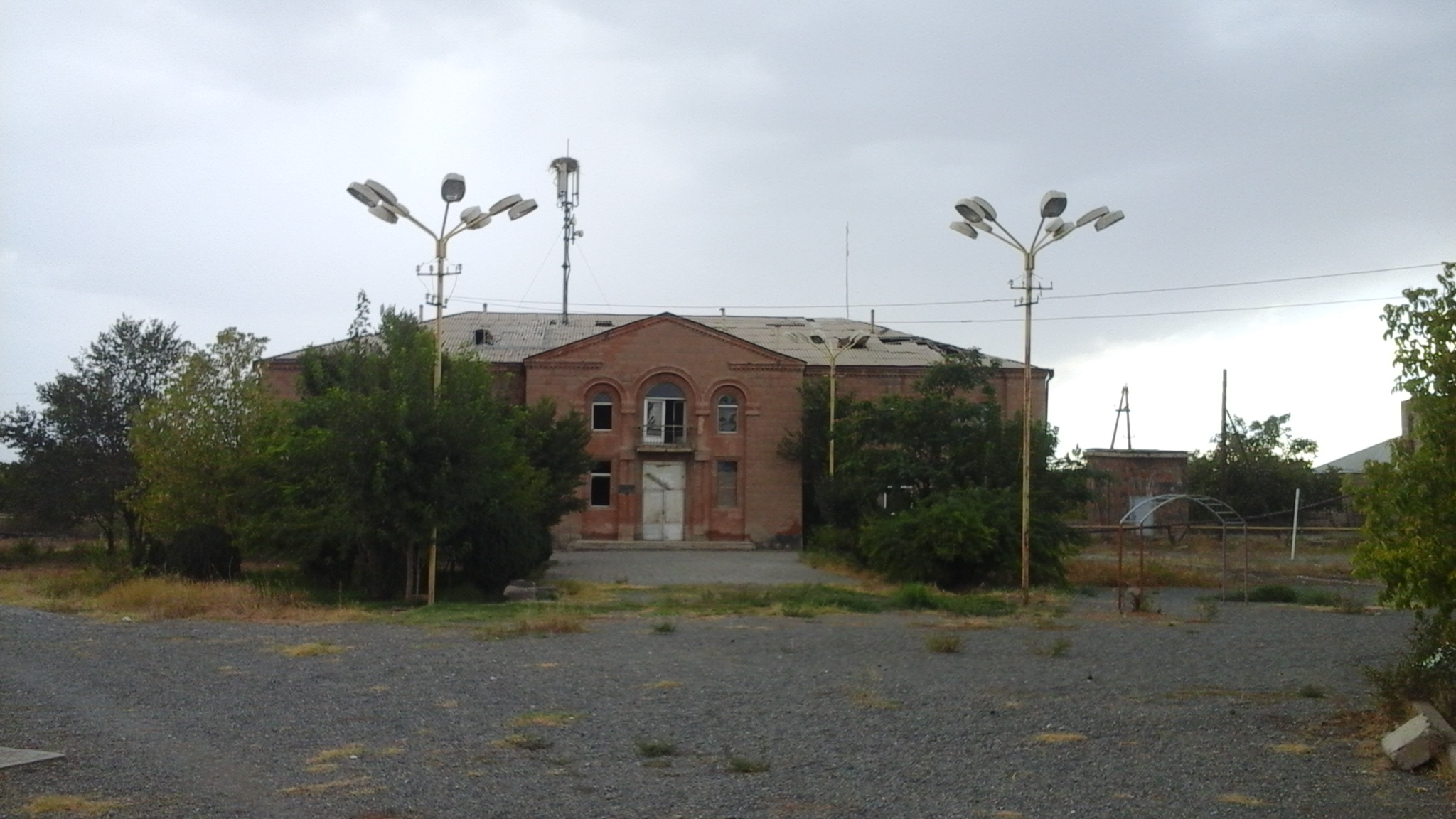
The Ashot Grigoryan House of Culture in Getashen, Armavir, Armenia

Getashen (Armenian: Գետաշեն; also, Kalagar; until 1946, Dzhafarabat and Jafarabad) is a town in the Armavir Province of Armenia on the border with Turkey.

== Development programs ==
Starting 2012 Children of Armenia Fund entered getashen with a holistic approach to advance the rural village life.

The programs implemented include Crufts Clubs, Student Councils, Debate Clubs, Aflatoun Social-Financial Education Club, professional orientation, Social and Psychological Assistance, Support to School Psychologists, Support to Children with Learning Difficulties, Drama Therapy, Healthy Lifestyle Education, School Nutrition & Brushodromes, Free Dental Care, Women Health Screenings, Support for Reproductive Health.

Children of Armenia Fund also renovated village facilities such as School, Creativity Lab, Cafeteria and Brushodrome, Green house, Agro-school.

== See also ==
- Armavir Province
- Children of Armenia Fund
