= Sarnaghbyur =

Village in Shirak, Armenia

Sarnaghbyur Սառնաղբյուր
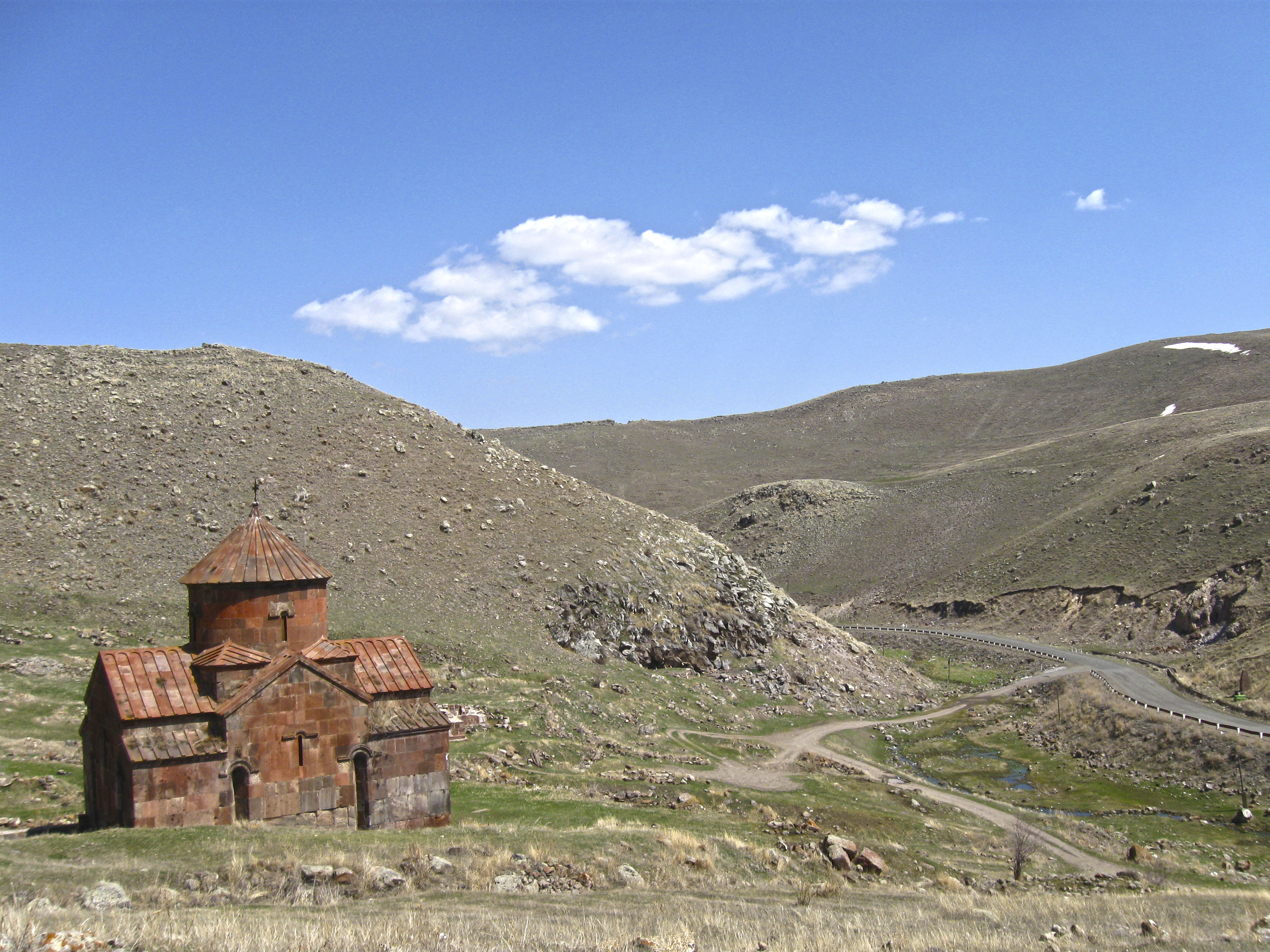
- Hokevank Monastery or the Red Monastery

- Location within Armenia Location within Shirak
- Coordinates: 40°31′26.67″N 43°54′35.55″E
- Country: Armenia
- Province: Shirak
- Municipality: Ani

Population (2011)
  - Total: 2,971
- Time zone: UTC+4

Sarnaghbyur (Armenian: Սառնաղբյուր) is a village in the Ani Municipality of the Shirak Province of Armenia. It was renamed Sarnaghbyur in 1940.

The village has an artificial reservoir that irrigates 1,000 hectares of land in Ani.

== Demographics ==
Historical population
Year	Pop.	±% p.a.
1831	262	—
1897	2,385	+3.40%
1939	2,851	+0.43%
1959	2,012	−1.73%
1970	2,394	+1.59%
1979	2,460	+0.30%
1989	2,928	+1.76%
2001	3,034	+0.30%
2011	2,971	−0.21%

== History ==
There is also an archeological site in the village. There are numerous evidences on the hill called Kalachi or Ghalachi, but no archaeological studies have been conducted so far. In May battles in the way it should be stated that the village is quite serious resistance to the Turkish 1918 on May 18–23 or 24 within the period. There are many accounts of these events. The village has a large area.

== Economy ==
The population is engaged in cattle breeding, cultivation of grain and fodder crops.

== Historical and cultural sights ==
The village has a number of historical monuments that probably indicate that the area was formerly inhabited.

In the center of the village are the churches of St. Tadevos (1883), St. Jacob (V-VI centuries) and St. Karapet ( 1205 ). Near the village are the Vogheni Monastery of the X-XIII centuries, St. Gregory the Illuminator pilgrimage site, and 6 km east - St. Lazar Church (V-VI centuries), "Gndakar" (1st millennium BC) and "Berdik" ( 2nd-1st millennium BCE) castles. In 1883, the Tadevos Apostolic Church was built, which is now in operation.

== Notable people ==
- Sahak Sahakyan (1929–2010) - artist and sculptor

== Gallery ==
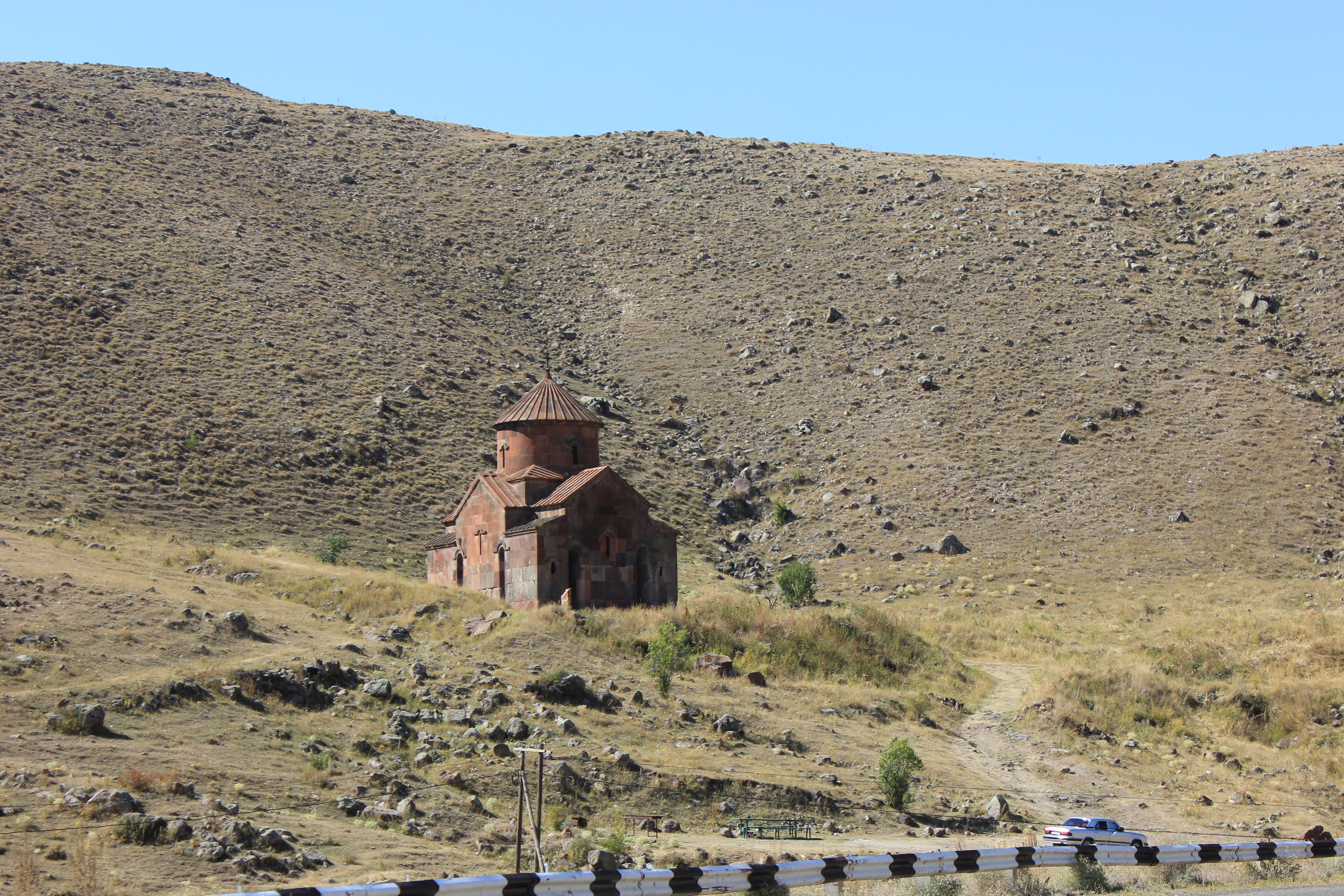
Hokevank monastery

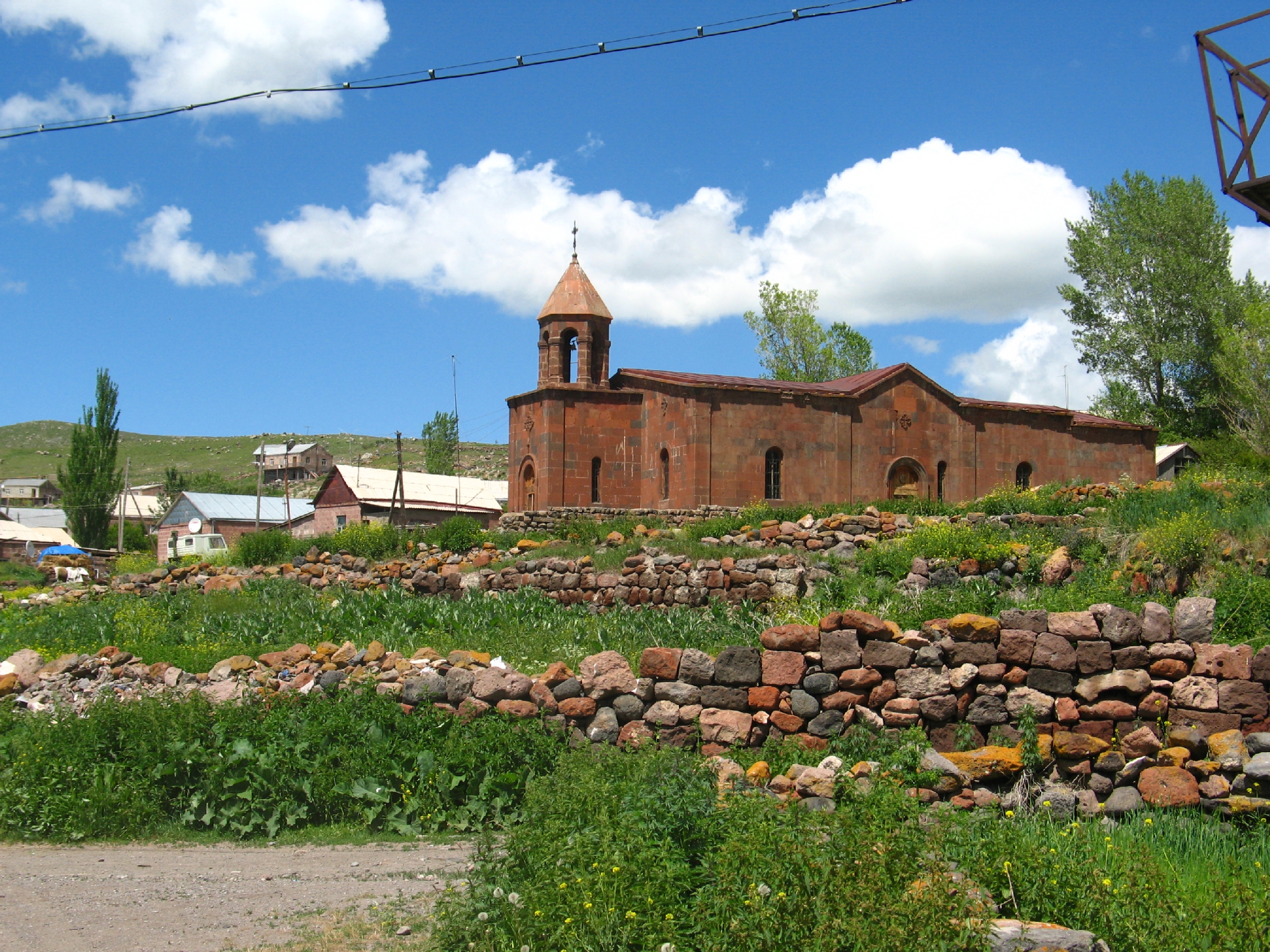
Saint Thadeus the Apostle church

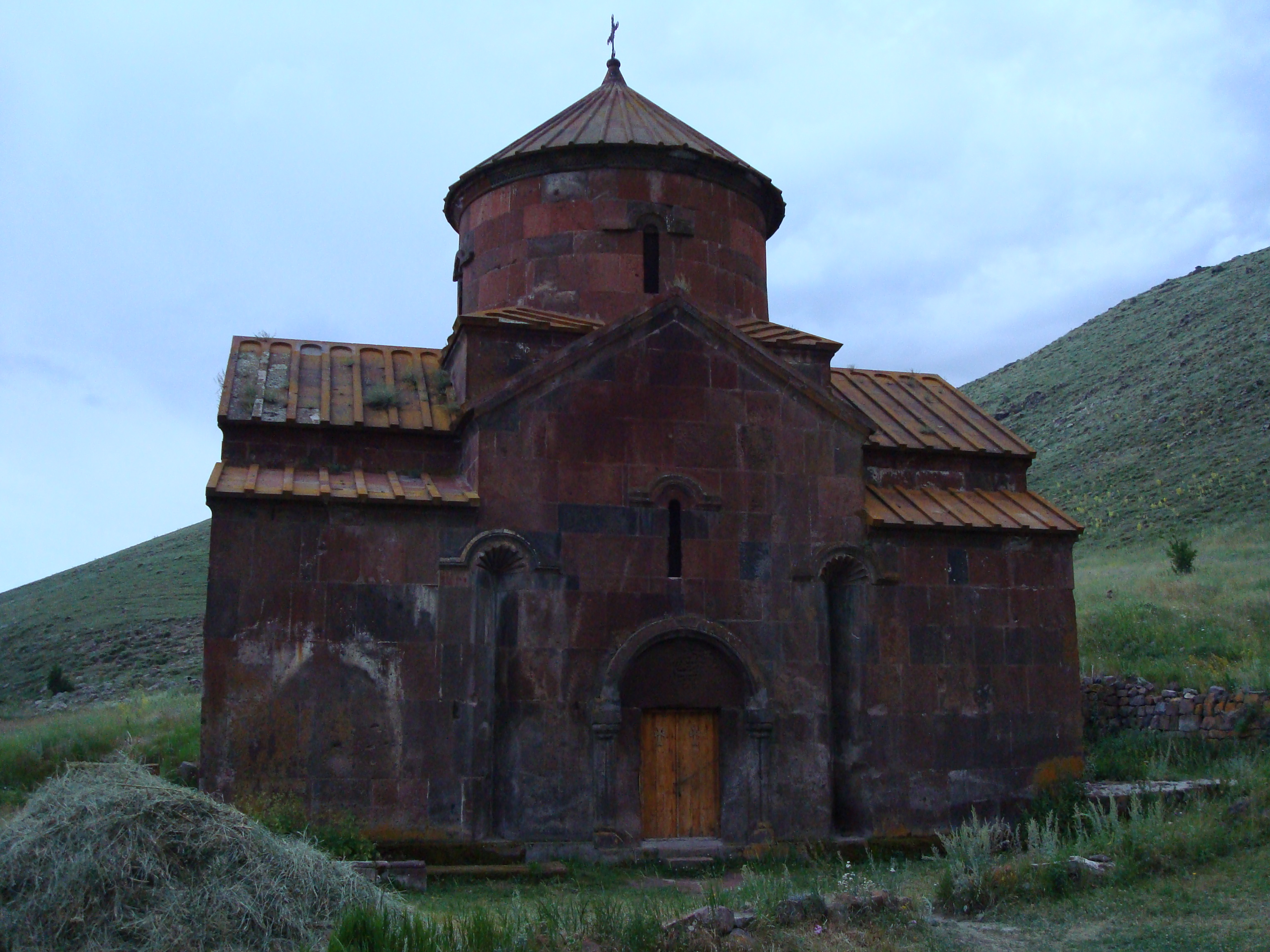
Saint Hakob church

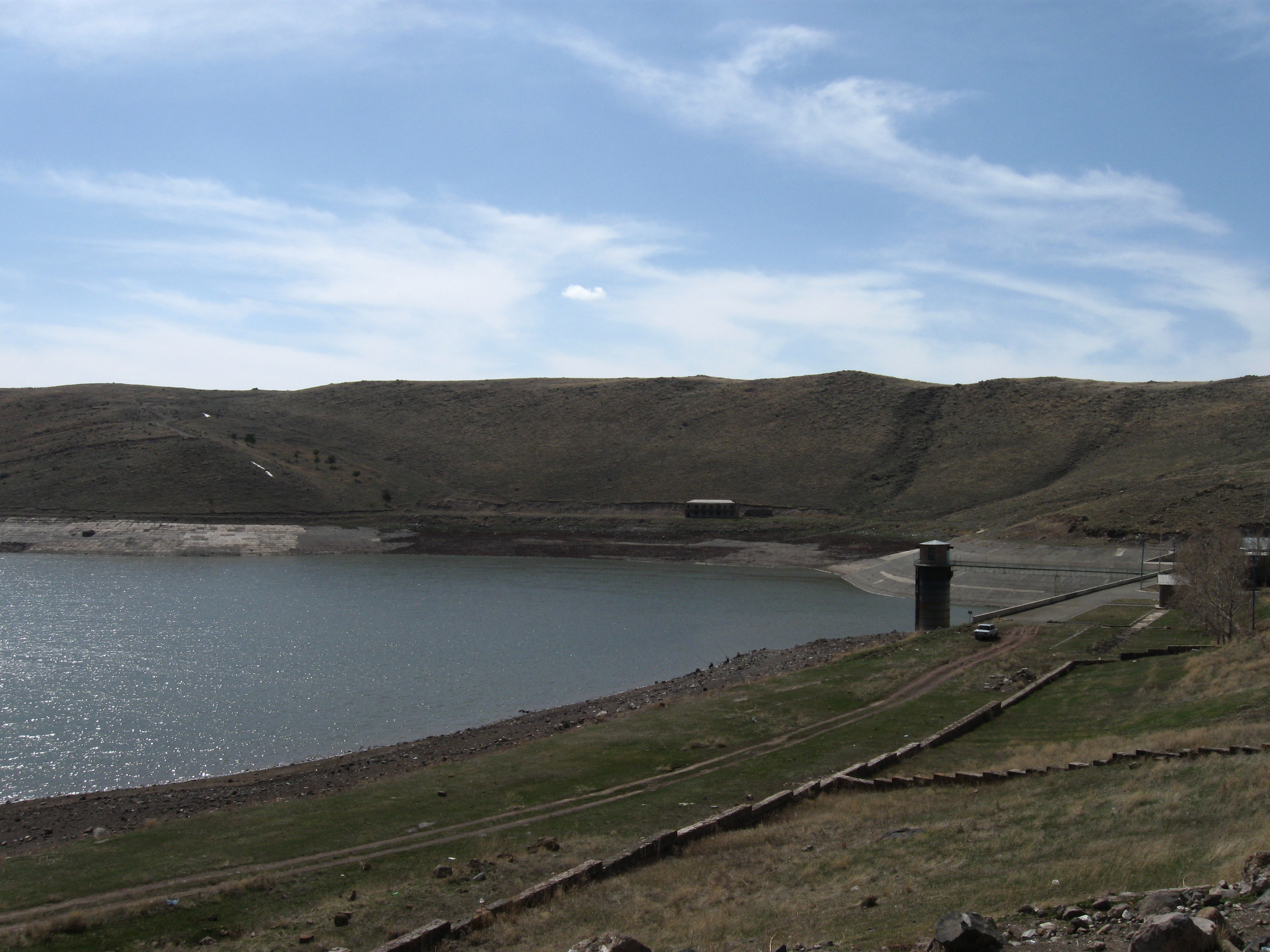
Water reservoir
