= Lernakert, Shirak =

Village in Shirak, Armenia

Lernakert Լեռնակերտ
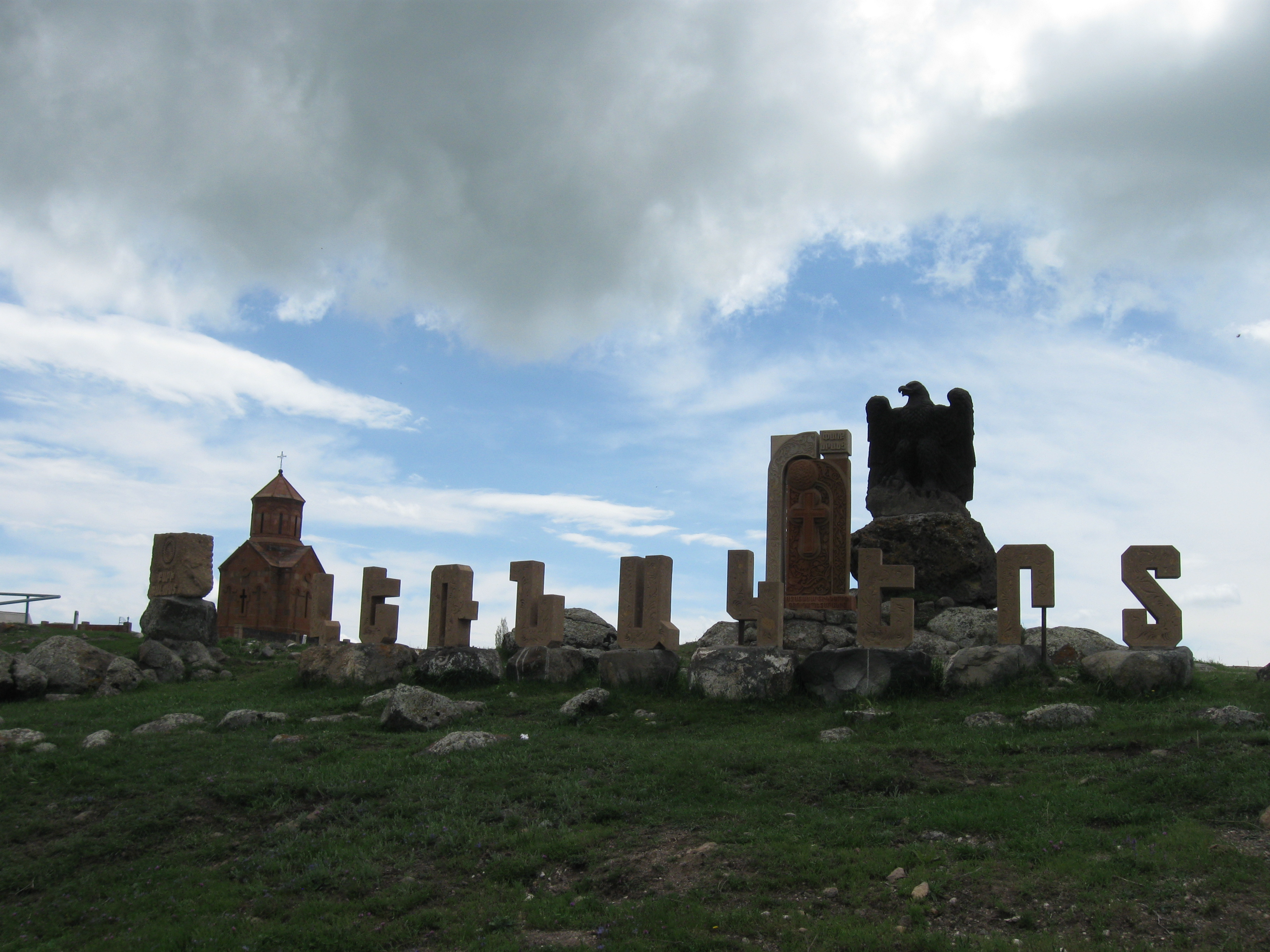

- Location within Armenia Location within Shirak
- Coordinates: 40°34′01″N 43°56′10″E
- Country: Armenia
- Province: Shirak
- Municipality: Artik

Population (2011)
  - Total: 1,412
- Time zone: UTC+4
  - Summer (DST): UTC+5

Lernakert (Armenian: Լեռնակերտ) is a village in the Artik Municipality of the Shirak Province of Armenia. The 10th to 13th-century Makaravank Church, with the church of Surb Sion of 1001 is located 1 mile north of the village. In the gorge below is a small church built on earlier foundations and constructed in the 18th century, with a hermit's cell cut into the cliff face behind.

== Demographics ==
Historical population
Year	Pop.	±% p.a.
1831	320	—
1897	1,602	+2.47%
1931	1,619	+0.03%
1970	1,466	−0.25%
1979	1,200	−2.20%
2001	1,449	+0.86%
2011	1,412	−0.26%

== Gallery ==
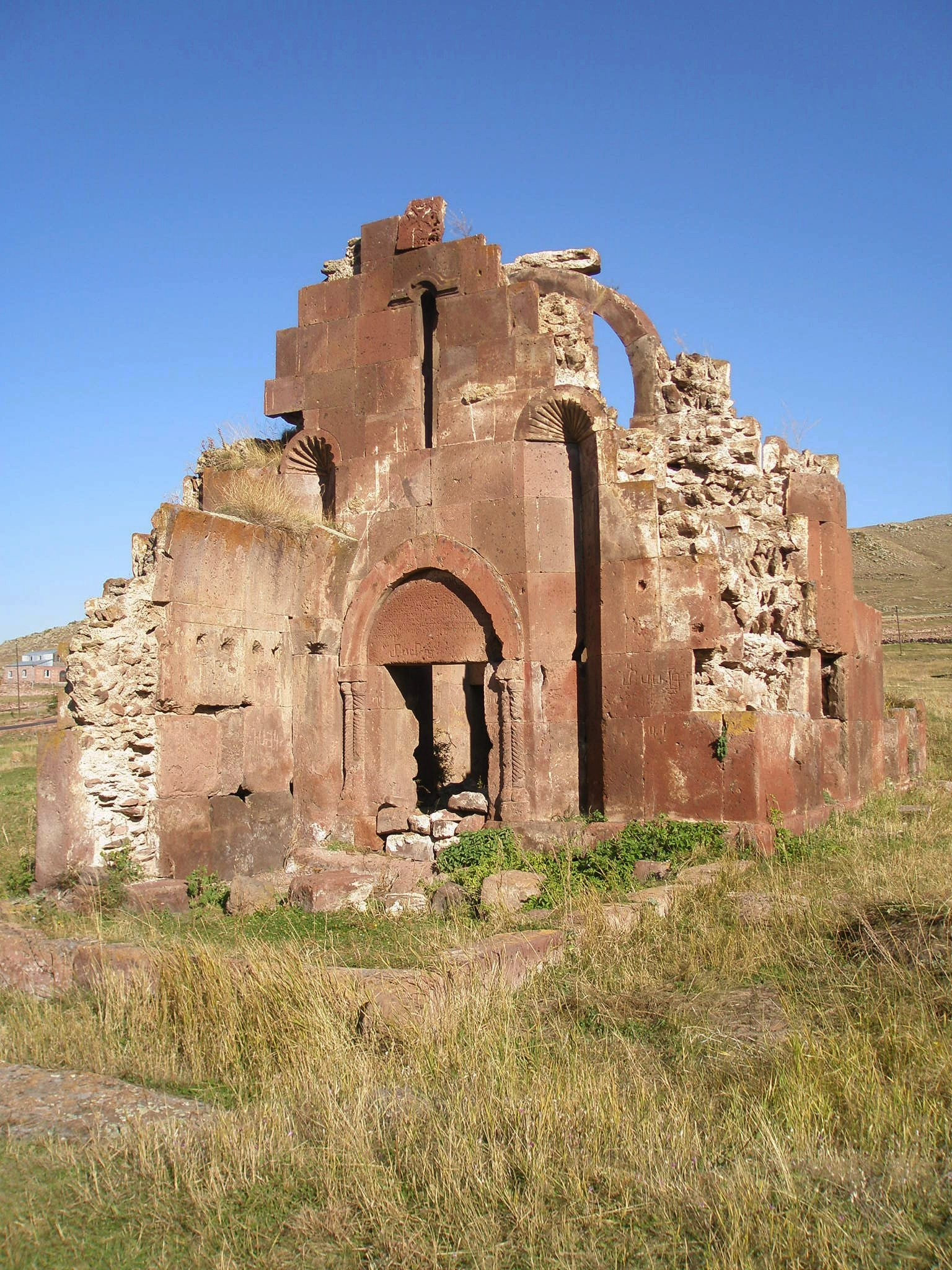
Makaravank Church, 10th-13th centuries

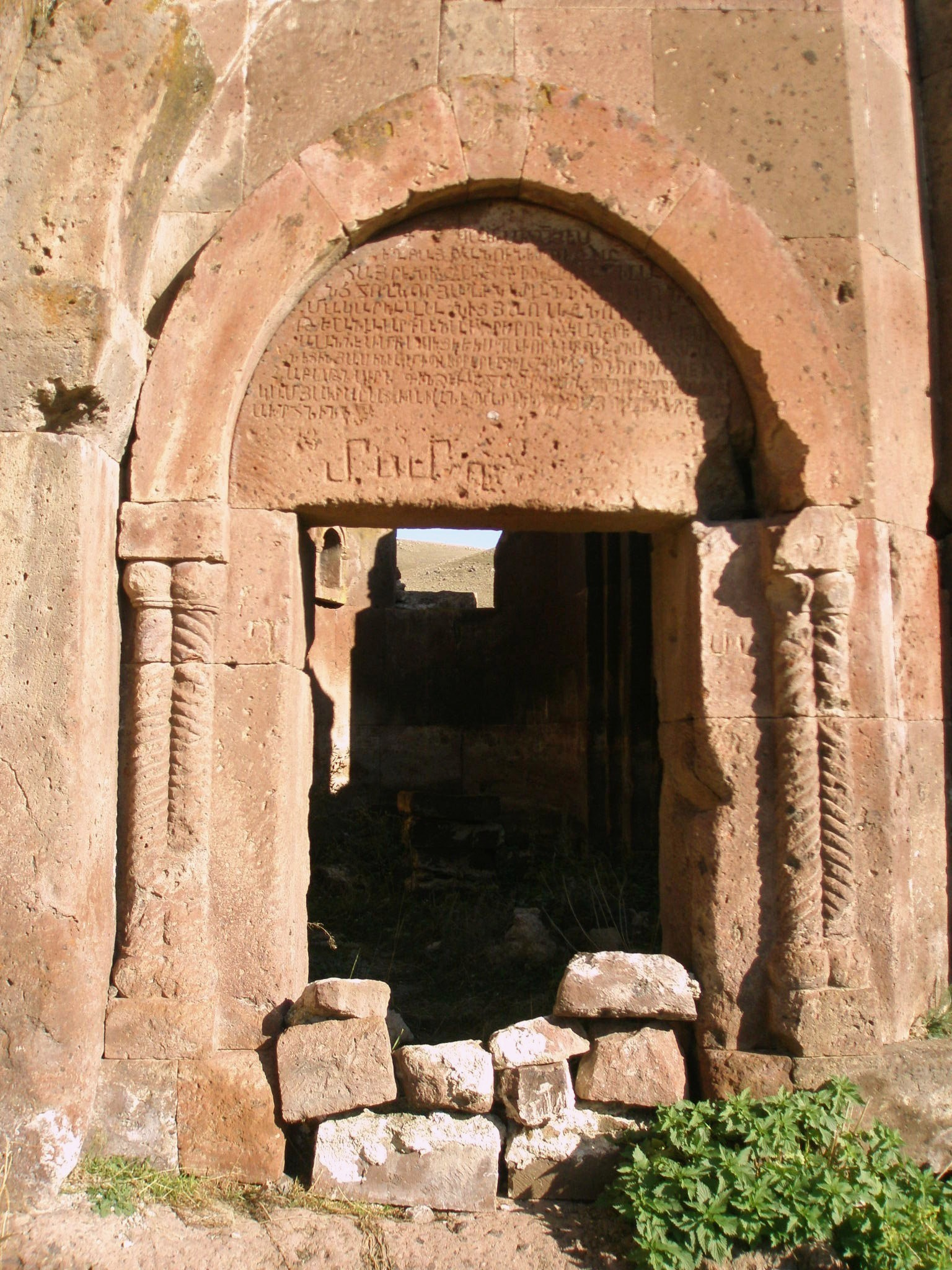
Makaravank Church entry

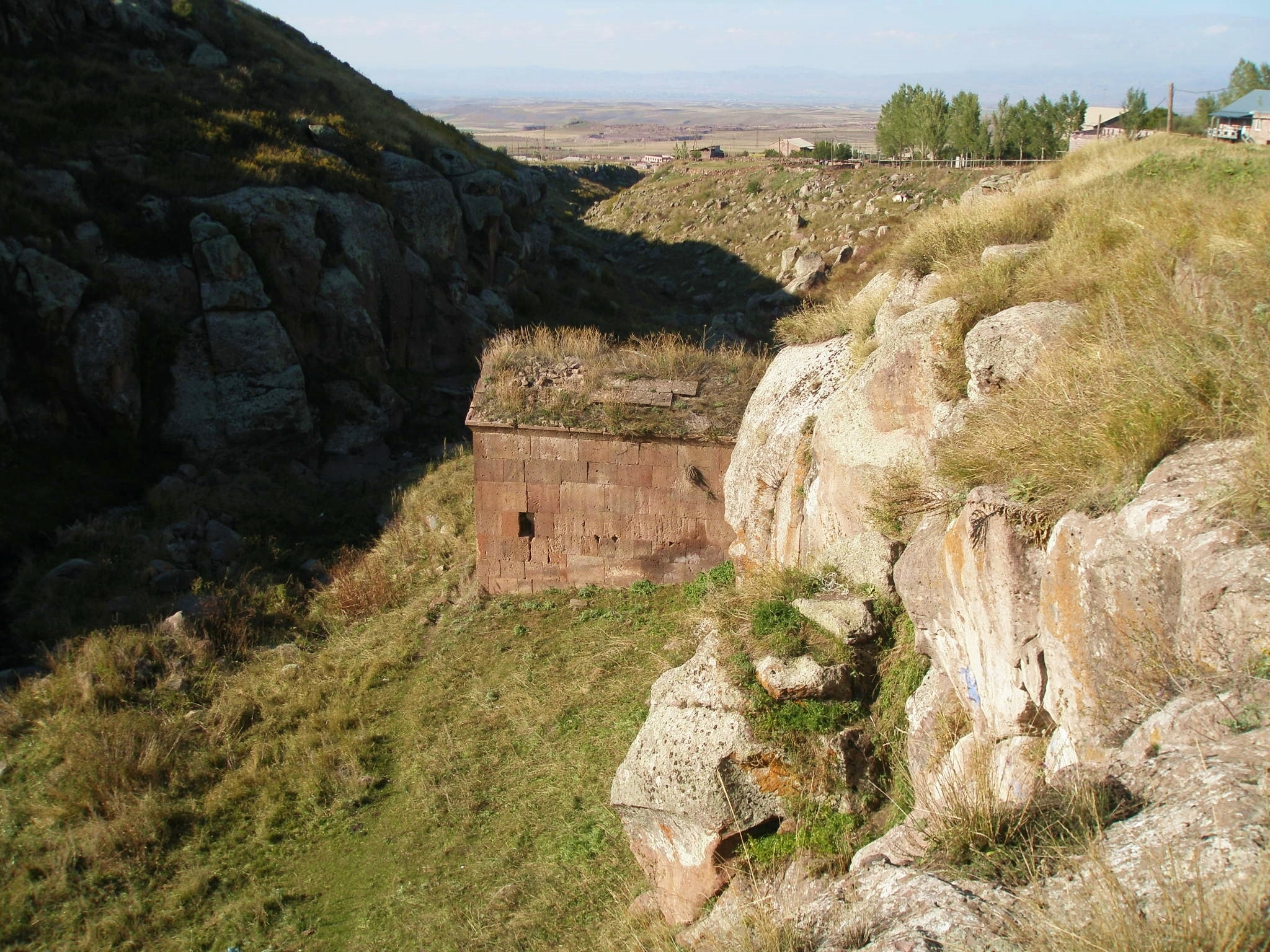
18th-century chapel in gorge below Makaravank

== See also ==
- Shirvan
- Shirvan (city)
