= Zartonk =

Village in Armavir, Armenia

Zartonk Զարթոնք
- Location within Armenia
- Coordinates: 40°06′33″N 44°09′38″E
- Country: Armenia
- Marz (Province): Armavir

Population (2011)
  - Total: 2,321
- Time zone: UTC+4 ( )
  - Summer (DST): UTC+5 ( )

Zartonk (Armenian: Զարթոնք), is a village in the Armavir Province of Armenia. Almost 42% (around 980 individuals) of the population are from the Yazidi minority.

== See also ==
- Armavir Province
