= Karakert =

Village in Armavir, Armenia

Karakert Քարակերտ
- Location within Armenia
- Coordinates: 40°14′25″N 43°48′35″E
- Country: Armenia
- Marz (Province): Armavir

Population (2011)
  - Total: 4,471
- Time zone: UTC+4 ( )
  - Summer (DST): UTC+5 ( )

Karakert (Armenian: Քարակերտ) is a village in the Armavir Province of Armenia. Its population in the 2011 census was 4,757.

== See also ==
- Armavir Province
