= I Caucasian Corps =

I Caucasian Corps Birinci Kafkas Kolordusu
- Active: September 1916–October 21, 1918
- Country: Ottoman Empire
- Type: Corps
- Patron: Sultans of the Ottoman Empire
- Engagements: Caucasus Campaign (World War I)

Commanders
- Notable commanders: Mirliva Yusuf Izzet Pasha (1916-1917); Mirliva Kâzım Karabekir Pasha (December 27, 1917-December 25, 1918)

The I Caucasian Corps of the Ottoman Empire (Turkish: 1 nci Kafkas Kolordusu or Birinci Kafkas Kolordusu) was one of the corps of the Ottoman Army. It was formed during World War I.

== Formations ==
=== Order of Battle, December 1916, August 1917, January 1918 ===
In December 1916, August 1917, January 1918, the corps was structured as follows:

- I Caucasian Corps (Caucasus)
  - 9th Caucasian Division, 10th Caucasian Division, 36th Caucasian Division

=== Order of Battle, June 1918 ===
In June 1918, the corps was structured as follows:

- I Caucasian Corps (Caucasus)
  - 9th Caucasian Division, 10th Caucasian Division, 15th Division
