= List of battles involving Armenia =

This is a list of battles involving Armenia and its predecessor states.

It only includes battles which have corresponding pages in Wikipedia.

The list gives the name, the date, the combatants, and the result of these conflicts following this legend:

Armenian victory
Armenian defeat
Another result(e.g. a treaty or peace without a clear result,
status quo ante bellum, result of civil or internal conflict, result unknown or indecisive)
Ongoing conflict

== Antiquity ==
Date	Battle	Modern Location	Conflict	Combatant 1	Combatant 2	Result
89 BC	Battle of Protopachium	Asia Minor (Turkey)	First Mithridatic War	Roman Empire; Kingdom of Bithynia	Kingdom of Armenia; Kingdom of Pontus	Victory
6 October 69 BC	Battle of Tigranocerta	Armenian highlands (Turkey)	Third Mithridatic War	Roman Empire	Kingdom of Armenia	Defeat: Lucullus defeated Tigranes II
68 BC	Battle of Artaxata	Ararat Province, Armenia	Third Mithridatic War	Roman Empire	Kingdom of Armenia	Defeat: Lucullus defeated both Tigranes II and Mithradates VI of Pontus
51 AD	Siege of Garni	Kotayk Province, Armenia	Iberian–Armenian War	Kingdom of Iberia	Kingdom of Armenia; Roman Empire	Defeat: Rhadamistus ascended on the Armenian throne
62 AD	Battle of Rhandeia	Rhandeia, modern Turkey	Roman–Parthian War of 58–63	Roman Empire	Parthian Empire; Arsacid Armenia	Victory
296	Battle of Carrhae	Between Carrhae (Harran) and Callinicum (al-Raqqah), Turkey and Syria	Galerius' Sasanian campaigns	Roman Empire; Arsacid Armenia	Sasanian Empire	Defeat
363	Battle of Ctesiphon	Ctesiphon, Mesopotamia, Iraq	Julian's Persian expedition	Roman Empire; Arsacid Armenia	Sasanian Empire	Victory
371	Battle of Bagavan	Bagavan, modern Turkey	Armeno-Sasanian War of 363–371	Roman Empire; Kingdom of Armenia	Sasanian Empire; Caucasian Albania	Victory

== Middle ages ==
Date	Battle	Modern Location	Conflict	Combatant 1	Combatant 2	Result
26 May 451	Battle of Avarayr	Avarayr Plain, Iran	Vahan's War	Sasanian Empire	Christian Armenians	Defeat: Although the Persians were victorious on the battlefield, it was a pyrrhic victory; The Armenians were allowed to continue practising Christianity freely.
482	Battle of Nersehapat	Nersehapat, modern Turkey	Vahan's War	Armenian rebels: House of Mamikonian	Sassanian Empire: Marzbanate of Armenia	Victory
640	Siege of Dvin (640)	Dvin, Ararat Province, Armenia	Muslim conquest of Armenia	Sasanian Armenia	Rashidun Caliphate	Defeat
702/703	Battle of Vardanakert	Vardanakert, North to the mountain Ararat, near the riverbanks of Araxes, Armenia	Anti-Arab rebellions	Bagratid Armenia	Umayyad Caliphate	Victory
775	Battle of Bagrevand	Bagrevand, Armenia	Anti-Arab rebellions	Armenian princes	Abbasid Caliphate	Defeat
854	Defense of Ktish	Dizak, currently Azerbaijan	Armenian Revolt (850–855)	Armenian rebels	Abbasid Caliphate	Victory
921	Battle of Sevan	North-West shore near Lake Sevan, Armenia	Sajid invasion of Armenia	(Bagratuni dynasty) Bagratid Armenia	Sajid dynasty	Victory
1021	Battle of Shirimni	Childir, Turkey	Byzantine–Georgian war (1014-1022)	Kingdom of Georgia; Bagratid Armenia	Byzantine Empire	Defeat
1040	Battle of Tashir	Gagi Fortress, Georgia (Georgia (country))	Georgian–Shaddadid wars	Kingdom of Tashir-Dzoraget; Kingdom of Ani; Kingdom of Kapan; Kingdom of Georgia	Shaddadids	Victory
1042	Battle of Ani	Ancient city of Ani, modern Turkey	Byzantine-Armenian war	(Bagratuni dynasty) Bagratid Armenia	Byzantine Empire	Victory
1196	Siege of Amberd	Amberd, Aragatsotn Province, Armenia	Georgian–Seljuk wars Georgian–Shaddadid wars	Kingdom of Georgia: Zakarid Armenia	Shaddadids	Victory
1199	Siege of Ani	Ancient city of Ani, modern Turkey	Georgian–Seljuk wars Georgian–Shaddadid wars	Kingdom of Georgia: Zakarid Armenia	Shaddadids	Victory
1236	Siege of Khokhanaberd	Khokhanaberd, present-day Azerbaijan	Mongol invasions of Georgia	Kingdom of Artsakh	Mongol Empire	Inconclusive
1266	Battle of Mari	Mari, near Darbsak, Turkey	Mamluk-Armenian Wars (1266-1375); Mongol invasions of the Levant	Cilician Armenia	Mamluk Sultanate	Defeat
1375	Fall of Sis	Sis near the modern town of Kozan, Adana Province, Turkey	Mamluk-Armenian Wars (1266-1375)	Cilician Armenia	Mamluk Sultanate	Defeat: Destruction of the Armenian Kingdom of Cilicia

== Early modern age ==
Date	Battle	Modern Location	Conflict	Combatant 1	Combatant 2	Result
1727	Battle of Halidzor	Halidzor Fortress, near the modern city of Kapan, Armenia	Syunik rebellion	Armenians of Syunik	Ottoman Empire; Armenian defectors	Victory
1751	Battle of Kirkhbulakh	Kirkhbulakh, near Yerevan, present-day Ararat province, Armenia	Azad Khan's invasion of Erivan Khanate	Kingdom of Kakheti; Kingdom of Kartli; Erivan Khanate	Army of Azad Khan	Victory

== First Republic of Armenia ==
Date	Battle	Modern Location	Conflict	Combatant 1	Combatant 2	Result
1907	Battle of Sulukh	Sulukh, near Muş, modern Turkey	Armenian National Liberation Movement	Armenian fedayi	Ottoman Empire	Defeat
1918	Battle of Sardarabad	Near Sardarapat, present-day Nor Armavir, Armenia	Armenian-Turkish war (1918)	(First Republic of Armenia) Armenian National Council	Ottoman Empire	Victory
1918	Battle of Abaran	Bash Abaran, Armenia	Armenian-Turkish war (1918)	(First Republic of Armenia) Armenian National Council	Ottoman Empire	Victory
1918	Battle of Mastara	Mastara, Armenia	Armenian-Turkish war (1918)	(First Republic of Armenia) Armenian National Council	Ottoman Empire	Victory
1918	Battle of Karakilisa	Vanadzor, Armenia	Armenian-Turkish war (1918)	(First Republic of Armenia) Armenian National Council	Ottoman Empire	Incoclusive
1918	Battle of Sadakhlo	Sadakhlo, Marneuli Municipality, Georgia	Armeno-Georgian War	First Republic of Armenia	Democratic Republic of Georgia	Victory
1919	Battle of Nakhchivan	Nakhchivan, Azerbaijan	Muslim uprisings in Kars and Sharur–Nakhichevan	First Republic of Armenia	Republic of Aras	Victory
1919	Zangezur Expedition	Zangezur uezd, present-day Armenia	Armenian-Azerbaijani War	First Republic of Armenia	(Azerbaijan Democratic Republic) Azerbaijan (Ottoman Empire) Turkish platoons (Kurdistan Region) Auxiliary Kurdish cavalry	Victory
1920	First Battle of Oltu	Oltu, modern Turkey	Turkish invasion of Armenia	First Republic of Armenia	Ottoman Empire	Victory
1920	Second Battle of Oltu	Oltu, modern Turkey	Turkish invasion of Armenia	First Republic of Armenia	(Ottoman Empire) Grand National Assembly of Turkey	Defeat
1920	Battle of Sarikamish (1920)	Sarıkamış, Kars Province, Turkey	Turkish invasion of Armenia	First Republic of Armenia	(Ottoman Empire) Grand National Assembly of Turkey	Defeat
1920	Battle of Surmalu	Surmalu, present-day Iğdır, Turkey	Turkish invasion of Armenia	First Republic of Armenia	(Ottoman Empire) Grand National Assembly of Turkey (Kurdistan Region) Several hundred Kurds	Victory
1920	Battle of Kars (1920)	Kars, Turkey	Turkish invasion of Armenia	First Republic of Armenia	(Ottoman Empire) Grand National Assembly of Turkey	Defeat
1920	Battle of Alexandropol	Alexandropol, today Gyumri, Armenia	Turkish invasion of Armenia	First Republic of Armenia	(Ottoman Empire) Grand National Assembly of Turkey	Defeat: Treaty of Alexandropol

== Modern Armenia ==
Date	Battle	Modern Location	Conflict	Combatant 1	Combatant 2	Result
1991-1992	Siege of Stepanakert	Stepanakert, Nagorno-Karabakh, present-day Azerbaijan	First Nagorno-Karabakh War	Artsakh; Armenia	Azerbaijan	Victory
1992	Battle of Shusha	Shusha, Nagorno-Karabakh, present-day Azerbaijan	First Nagorno-Karabakh War	Artsakh; Armenia	Azerbaijan; Chechen volunteers	Victory
1992-1993	Operation Goranboy	Goranboy and Tartar provinces, present-day Azerbaijan	First Nagorno-Karabakh War	Artsakh; Armenia	Azerbaijan	Azerbaijan initially managed to break through the NKR defenses and capture over 48% of former NKAO territory, but failed in their overall strategic goal.
1992	Mardakert and Martuni Offensives	Mardakert and Martuni, Nagorno-Karabakh, present-day Azerbaijan	First Nagorno-Karabakh War	Artsakh	Azerbaijan	Victory
1992	Battle of Lachin	Lachin corridor, present-day Azerbaijan	First Nagorno-Karabakh War	Artsakh; Armenia	Azerbaijan	Victory
1993	Battle of Kalbajar	Kalbajar District, present-day Azerbaijan	First Nagorno-Karabakh War	Artsakh; Armenia	Azerbaijan	Victory
1993	Battle of Aghdam	Aghdam, present-day Azerbaijan	First Nagorno-Karabakh War	Artsakh; Armenia	Azerbaijan	Victory
1993	1993 Summer Offensives	Agdam, Fuzuli, Jabrayil, Qubadli and Zangilan districts, present-day Azerbaijan	First Nagorno-Karabakh War	Artsakh; Armenia	Azerbaijan; Hezb-e-Islami	Victory
1993	Operation Horadiz	Fuzuli District, present-day Azerbaijan	First Nagorno-Karabakh War	Artsakh; Armenia	Azerbaijan; Afghan Mujahideen	Defeat
1993-1994	Operation Kalbajar	Kalbajar District, present-day Azerbaijan	First Nagorno-Karabakh War	Artsakh; Armenia	Azerbaijan	Victory
2020	Aras Valley campaign	Present-day Azerbaijan	Second Nagorno-Karabakh War	Artsakh; Armenia	Azerbaijan	Defeat
2020	Madagiz offensive	Tartar District, present-day Azerbaijan	Second Nagorno-Karabakh War	Artsakh; Armenia	Azerbaijan	Defeat
2020	Battle of Hadrut	Hadrut, present-day Azerbaijan	Second Nagorno-Karabakh War	Artsakh; Armenia	Azerbaijan	Defeat
2020	Lachin offensive	Present-day Azerbaijan	Second Nagorno-Karabakh War	Artsakh; Armenia	Azerbaijan	Defeat
2020	Battle of Shusha (2020)	Shusha, present-day Azerbaijan	Second Nagorno-Karabakh War	Artsakh; Armenia	Azerbaijan (Syrian opposition) Syrian mercenaries	Defeat

== Sources ==
- Keaveney, Arthur (1992). Lucullus: A Life. Routledge.
- Sherwin-White, A. N. (1994). "Lucullus, Pompey and the East 8a - Lucullus, Pompey and the East". In Crook, John; Lintott, Andrew; Rawson, Elizabeth (eds.). The Cambridge Ancient History, Volume 9: The Last Age of the Roman Republic, 146–43 BC. Vol. 9. Cambridge University Press. pp. 229–273. ISBN 978-0521256032.
- Steel, Catherine (2013). The End of the Roman Republic 146 to 44 BC: Conquest and Crisis. Edinburgh University Press.
- Wylie, Graham J. (1994). "Lucullus Daemoniac". L'Antiquité Classique. 63: 117. "Foiled in this, Lucullus now decided on a midsummer (68 B.C.) offensive deep into Armenia, to crush his «exhausted antagonists»Mithridates and Tigranes who, anticipating such a move, had assembled another large army with a powerful cavalry force to harass his foragers. He brought them to battle north of Lake Van, somewhere on the upper Arsanias, an eastern tributary of the Euphrates, and put their army to flight (PLUT., Luc., 31, 5). Tigranes at once retreated to his capital, Artaxata."
