= List of wars involving Georgia (country) =

This is a list of military conflicts (wars, invasions, rebellions against the foreign rule etc.) involving Georgia and its predecessor states. Non-military operations like the law enforcement are not included in the article. The list gives the name, the date, the combatants, and the result of the conflicts following this legend:

Georgian victory
Georgian defeat
Another result (e.g. a treaty or peace without a clear result,
status quo ante bellum, result of civil or internal conflict, result unknown or indecisive)
Ongoing conflict

== Colchis and Iberia ==
Date	Conflict	Combatant 1	Combatant 2	Result
1112-845 BC	Assyrian Invasions of Diauehi	Diauehi	Assyrian Empire	Defeat
790-785 BC	Urartian Invasions of Diauehi	Diauehi	Urartu	Defeat
743 BC	Urartian Invasion of Colchis	Colchis	Urartu	Defeat
720s BC	Scytho-Cimmerian invasion of Colchis	Colchis	Scythians; Cimmerians	Defeat
170 BC	Campaigns of Artaxias I	Kingdom of Iberia	Kingdom of Armenia; Iberian nobles	Defeat: Armenia seizes Gogarene, Chorzene, and Paryadres; Pharnajom dies in a battle and Artaxias I is installed on the Iberian throne
65 BC	Pompey's campaign of Georgia	Kingdom of Iberia; Colchis	Roman Republic	Defeat: Vassalization of Iberia; Annexation of Colchis
38-21 BC	Armenian-Iberian War	Kingdom of Iberia (diarchy); Alania	Kingdom of Armenia	Compromise: Artaxias II's general and son Zaren was captured by Iberians and released in exchange for Armenia ceding Tsunda, Javakheti, Ardahan, and the Fortress of Demoti back to Iberia and forming a defensive alliance
36 BC	Crassus's invasion of Iberia	Kingdom of Iberia	Roman Republic	Defeat: Rome restores vassalage of Iberia
35 AD	Iberian invasion of Armenia	Kingdom of Iberia; Roman Empire	Kingdom of Armenia; Parthian Empire	Victory: Mithridates installed as king of Armenia
50-53	Iberian–Armenian War	Kingdom of Iberia; Roman Empire (35-50, 52-54)	Kingdom of Armenia; Parthian Empire; Roman Empire (50-51)	Inconclusive: Iberia subjugates Armenia, but subsequently retreats under pressure from the Parthians.
58-63	Roman–Parthian War of 58–63	Roman Empire; Sophene; Lesser Armenia; Kingdom of Iberia; Commagene; Kingdom of Pontus	Kingdom of Armenia; Parthian Empire	Defeat: Treaty of Rhandeia; Arsacids established on Armenian throne
135	Alan raids of 135	Alans; Kingdom of Iberia	Caucasian Albania; Roman Empire Atropatene; Parthian Empire	Victory
296-299	Galerius' Sasanian campaigns	Sasanian Empire; Kingdom of Iberia; Lakhmid kingdom	Roman Empire; Armenia	Defeat: Iberia becomes the Roman vassal according to the Treaty of Nisibis.

== Early Medieval fragmentation ==
Date	Conflict	Combatant 1	Combatant 2	Result
458-466	Sasanian–Kidarite war	Sassanid Empire: Kingdom of Iberia	Kidarites	Victory
466	Vakhtang Gorgasali's campaign in North Caucasus	Kingdom of Iberia	North Caucasian Huns; Saragurs; Alans	Victory
482-484 & 502	Vakhtang I's rebellion against the Sasanians	Kingdom of Iberia	Sassanid Empire	Defeat
523	Gurgen's rebellion (523)	Kingdom of Iberia	Sasanian Empire	Defeat
526-532	Iberian War	Byzantine Empire; Kingdom of Iberia	Sasanian Empire	Inconclusive: Perpetual Peace (532); Sasanians retained Iberia; Byzantines retained Lazica
541-562	Lazic War	Byzantine Empire; Lazica (548-562)	Sasanian Empire; Lazica (541-548)	Inconclusive: Fifty-Year Peace Treaty
550	Abasgian revolt	Abasgia	Byzantine Empire	Defeat
556	Misimian revolt	Misimian rebels	Byzantine Empire	Defeat
571	Gurgen's rebellion	Kingdom of Iberia	Sasanian Empire	Inconclusive: Beginning of the Byzantine–Sasanian War of 572–591
572–591	Byzantine–Sasanian War of 572–591	Byzantine Empire; Kingdom of Iberia (Guaramid branch); Ghassanids; Mamikonians; Huns; Supporters of Khosrow II	Sasanian Empire; Kingdom of Iberia (until 580); Lakhmids; Sabir Huns	Sassanids abolish the Kingdom of Iberia, but the Principality of Iberia is established with the Byzantine help under the Guaramid dynasty
602-628	Byzantine–Sasanian War of 602–628: Perso-Turkic war of 627–629	Sasanian Empire: Sasanian Iberia	Byzantine Empire; Western Turkic Khaganate; Ghassanids	Defeat: End of Sasanian Iberia
627-764	Khazar–Georgian wars	Principality of Iberia	Khazar Khaganate	Inconclusive
643-655	Habib ibn Maslama al-Fihri's invasions of Georgia	Principality of Iberia	Rashidun Caliphate	Defeat: Beginning of the Arab rule in Georgia
729-730	Al-Jarrah ibn Abdallah's invasion of Georgia	Principality of Iberia Khazar Khaganate	Umayyad Caliphate	Victory
735-737	Invasion of Marwan the Deaf	Principality of Iberia; Abasgia	Umayyad Caliphate	Defeat
840-842	Khalid ibn Yazid al-Shaybani's invasion of Georgia	Emirate of Tbilisi Principality of Kakheti	Abbasid Caliphate: Arminiya; Principality of Tao	Victory
853	Bugha al-Kabir's invasion of Georgia	Emirate of Tbilisi Kingdom of Abkhazia; Tsanars	Abbasid Caliphate: Arminiya; Principality of Tao	Victory • Bugha the Turk withdraws from the Caucasus
881-891	Dynastic strife in Iberia	Adarnase IV of Iberia; Bagratid Armenia; Bagrat I of Klarjeti	Nasra of Tao-Klarjeti; Kingdom of Abkhazia; Alania Gurgen I of Tao	Establishment of the Kingdom of the Iberians under Adarnase IV of Iberia
914-923	Sajid invasion of Georgia	Kingdom of the Iberians	Sajid dynasty	Defeat
976-979	Rebellion of Bardas Skleros	Byzantine Empire; Kingdom of the Iberians	Bardas Skleros	Victory: David III gains Theodosioupolis, Phasiane, Hark', Apahunik', Mardali (Mardaghi), Khaldoyarich, and Ch'ormayari
987-989	Rebellion of Bardas Phokas the Younger	Byzantine Empire	Phokas; Principality of Tao; Buyid Dynasty	Defeat: David III of Tao is forced to make Basil II the legatee of his possessions

== Kingdom of Georgia ==
Date	Conflict	Combatant 1	Combatant 2	Result
1012–1199	Georgian–Shaddadid wars	Kingdom of Georgia	Shaddadids	Victory: Fall of the Shaddadid dynasty
1021-1022	Byzantine–Georgian war (1021–1022)	Kingdom of Georgia; Bagratid Armenia; Kingdom of Kakheti-Hereti	Byzantine Empire	Defeat: Byzantine–Georgian treaty of 1022
1028	Byzantine–Georgian war (1028)	Kingdom of Georgia	Byzantine Empire	Victory • Byzantine–Georgian treaty of 1031
1033-1058	Georgian civil war of 1033-1058	Kingdom of Georgia; Varangians	(Kingdom of Georgia) Demetrius of Anacopia (1033-1042); Liparit IV of Kldekari (1039-1060); Byzantine Empire; Kingdom of Kakheti-Hereti; Kingdom of Tashir-Dzoraget	Bagrat IV was recognized as king
1064-1068	Alp Arslan's invasions of Georgia	Kingdom of Georgia	Seljuk Empire; Kingdom of Kakheti-Hereti; Kingdom of Tashir-Dzoraget; Emirate of Tbilisi; Shaddadids	Defeat
1064-1213	Georgian–Seljuk wars	Kingdom of Georgia: Kipchaks; Alania; English mercenaries; Frankish mercenaries	Seljuk Empire: Kingdom of Kakheti-Hereti; Eldiguzids; Emirate of Tbilisi; Shaddadids; Shah-Armens; Artuqids; Saltukids; Shirvanshahs; Sultanate of Rum	Victory: Liberation of Tbilisi and most of the South Caucasus
1117-1124	Georgian conquest of Shirvan	Kingdom of Georgia	Seljuk Empire; Shirvanshahs	Victory: Conquest of Shirvan
1177-1178	Orbeli's Rebellion	(Kingdom of Georgia) George III of Georgia	(Kingdom of Georgia) Demna of Georgia Orbelian dynasty	Victory of George III
1190-1193	Revolt of Yury Bogolyubsky	Kingdom of Georgia	Yury Bogolyubsky	Victory • Yury Bogolyubsky disappeared from history after. His town has not been found
1204	Georgian expedition to Chalcia	Kingdom of Georgia	Byzantine Empire	Victory: Foundation of the Empire of Trebizond
1204-1210	Ayyubid-Georgian war	Kingdom of Georgia	Ayyubid Empire	Inconclusive: Thirty Years' Truce
1209-1211	Georgian campaign against the Eldiguzids	Kingdom of Georgia	Eldiguzids	Victory: The Eldiguzids became vassals of Georgia
1212	Rebellion in Pkhovi and Didoya	Kingdom of Georgia: Durdzuks	Pkhovi; Didoya	Victory: Rebellion suppressed
1225-1228	Khwarazmian–Georgian wars	Kingdom of Georgia: Vainakhs; Alans	Khwarazmian Empire: Kipchaks; Persians	Defeat
1220-1236	Mongol invasions of Georgia	Kingdom of Georgia	Mongol Empire: Khwarazmian Empire (1220-1221)	Defeat
1241-1335	Mongol conquest of Anatolia	Mongol Empire Cilician Armenia; Kingdom of Georgia Ilkhanate	Seljuk Sultanate of Rum Anatolian beyliks	Victory
1256	Georgian Rebellion of 1256	Kingdom of Georgia	Mongol Empire	Partial Mongol victory: Independence of Western Georgia
1260-1264	David VII's rebellion	Kingdom of Georgia (Eastern): Principality of Samtskhe	Ilkhanate Georgian nobles	Defeat
1260-1323	Mongol invasions of the Levant	Ilkhanate Cilician Armenia; Kingdom of Georgia; Seljuk Sultanate of Rum; Antioch-Tripoli; Golden Horde (before 1264); Kingdom of Jerusalem; Knights Templar; Knights Hospitaller	Mamluk Sultanate Ayyubid remnants Nizari Ismailis of Syria; Golden Horde (after 1264); Karamanid rebels Abbasid Caliphate	Defeat
1282	Georgian invasion of Trebizond	Kingdom of Western Georgia	Empire of Trebizond	King David VI annexes the eastern part of the Trapezuntine Empire but fails to reestablish it as a vassal
1302-1303	Azat Mousa's invasion of Georgia	Principality of Samtskhe	Sultanate of Rum	Victory
1327-1335	George V Brilliant's Campaign against the Mongols	Kingdom of Georgia	Ilkhanate	Victory: Mongolians expelled from Georgia
1341	Georgian intervention in Trebizond	Anna Anachoutlou; Kingdom of Georgia; Laz people	Irene Palaiologina of Trebizond	Anna Anachoutlou is installed on Trapezuntine throne but is quickly overthrown
14th century	Vameq's invasion of Jiketi	Duchy of Mingrelia	Kingdom of Zichia	Victory
1386-1403	Timurid invasions of Georgia	Kingdom of Georgia	Timurid Empire	Defeat: Truce of Shamkor
1407-1502	Turkoman invasions of Georgia	Kingdom of Georgia; Shirvanshah; Safavid Empire (1502)	Qara Qoyunlu (1407-1468); Aq Qoyunlu (1468-1502)	Victory: End of invasions against Georgia and consolidation of Safavids in Persia
1463-1490	Georgian Civil War (1463–1490)	Kingdom of Georgia	Kingdom of Imereti; Principality of Samtskhe; Principality of Mingrelia; Principality of Guria; Principality of Svaneti; Principality of Abkhazia Kingdom of Kakheti	Defeat • Collapse of the Georgian realm

== Kingdoms and principalities ==
Date	Conflict	Combatant 1	Combatant 2	Result
1509	Ottoman invasion of Imereti (1509)	Kingdom of Imereti Principality of Guria	Ottoman Empire	Defeat
1533	Mamia's invasion of Jiketi	Principality of Mingrelia; Principality of Guria	Kingdom of Zichia	Defeat: The allies won the first battle, but the Circassians defeated the allies in the second battle
1547	Ottoman invasion of Guria	Principality of Guria	Ottoman Empire	Defeat
1549-1551	Ottoman invasion of Samtskhe	Principality of Samtskhe	Ottoman Empire	Defeat
1541-1566	Tahmasp I's Kakhetian and Kartlian campaigns	Kingdom of Kakheti; Kingdom of Kartli	Safavid Iran	Defeat
1578-1590	Ottoman–Safavid War (1578–1590): Lala Mustafa Pasha's Caucasian campaign	Safavid Iran; Kingdom of Kartli (1578–1588); Kingdom of Kakheti (1578); Samtskhe-Saatabago (1578, 1582–1587); Principality of Guria (1583–1587)	Ottoman Empire (Autonomous Republic of Crimea) Crimean Khanate; Kingdom of Imereti; Principality of Guria (1578-1583, after 1587); Principality of Mingrelia; Principality of Samtskhe (1578-1582)	Ottoman victory: Treaty of Istanbul (1590)
1603-1612	Ottoman–Safavid war (1603–1612)	Safavid Iran: Kingdom of Kartli; Kingdom of Kakheti	Ottoman Empire	Victory: Treaty of Nasuh Pasha
1614-1617	Abbas I's Kakhetian and Kartlian campaigns: Kakhetian uprising (1615)	Kingdom of Kakheti; Kingdom of Kartli	Safavid Iran	Defeat
1625	Kartli-Kakhetian Uprising (1625)	Kingdom of Kartli Kingdom of Kakheti	Safavid Iran	Victory
1623-1658	Georgian civil war of 1623–1658	Kingdom of Imereti; Salipartiano (from 1657)	Principality of Mingrelia; Principality of Guria; Principality of Abkhazia; Kingdom of Kartli Safavid Iran	Imeretian victory: Imereti restores hegemony over western Georgia
1659	Kakhetian Uprising (1659)	Kingdom of Kakheti: Tushetians; Khevsurs; Pshavs	Safavid Iran: Turcoman tribes	Victory: 80,000 Turcomans & Persians killed or expelled from Kakheti
1703	Ottoman invasion of western Georgia	Kingdom of Imereti; Principality of Guria; Principality of Mingrelia	Ottoman Empire	Victory
1722-1723	Russo-Persian War (1722–1723)	Russian Empire; Ukrainian Cossacks; Kingdom of Kartli	Safavid Iran	Russian victory but Georgian defeat: Treaty of Saint Petersburg (1723); Treaty of Constantinople (1724); Vakhtang VI of Kartli lost his throne in 1724 and Kingdom of Kartli was annexed by the Ottoman Empire in 1727
1730-1735	Ottoman–Persian War (1730–1735): Caucasus campaign of 1734–1735	Safavid Iran: Kingdom of Kakheti (from 1732); Kingdom of Kartli (from 1735)	Ottoman Empire	Victory: Treaty of Constantinople (1736); Treaty of Ganja
1738–1739	Nader Shah's invasion of India	Afsharid Empire; Kingdom of Kakheti	Mughal Empire; Hyderabad State; Oudh	Victory
1742–1745	Kartlian rebellion	Afsharid Iran; Kingdom of Kartli; Kingdom of Kakheti	Givi Amilakhvari and his followers	Victory
1768-1774	Russo-Turkish War (1768–1774)	Russian Empire; Kingdom of Kartli-Kakheti; Kingdom of Imereti	Ottoman Empire	Victory: Treaty of Küçük Kaynarca
1796	Persian expedition of 1796	Russian Empire; Kingdom of Kartli-Kakheti	Qajar Iran	Russian withdrawal: Tactical Russian victory; Strategic Persian victory

== Russian Empire ==
Date	Conflict	Combatant 1	Combatant 2	Result
1804	1804 Mtiuleti rebellion	Georgian and Ossetian rebels	(Russia) Russian Empire	Defeat
1804-1813	Russo-Persian War (1804–1813)	(Russia) Russian Empire: Georgia Governorate	Qajar Iran	Victory: Treaty of Gulistan
1806-1812	Russo-Turkish War (1806–1812)	(Russia) Russian Empire; Principality of Mingrelia; Principality of Guria; Principality of Abkhazia (1810-1812); Wallachia	Ottoman Empire (Autonomous Republic of Crimea) Crimean Khanate; Principality of Abkhazia (1808-1810)	Victory: Treaty of Bucharest (1812)
1810	Imeretian Rebellion (1810)	Kingdom of Imereti	(Russia) Russian Empire	Defeat: Kingdom of Imereti abolished and annexed to the Russian Empire
1812	Kakhetian Uprising (1812)	Kakhetian rebels	(Russia) Russian Empire	Defeat
1819-1820	Imeretian Rebellion (1819-1820)	Imeretian rebels	(Russia) Russian Empire	Defeat
1828-1829	Russo-Turkish War (1828–1829)	Russian Empire: Georgia Governorate; Imeretian Oblast; Principality of Mingrelia; Principality of Guria; Principality of Svaneti; Principality of Abkhazia; Supported by: (Kingdom of France) France; United Kingdom	Ottoman Empire	Victory: Treaty of Adrianople (1829)
1841	Rebellion in Guria (1841)	Gurian rebels	(Russia) Russian Empire	Defeat
1853-1856	The Caucasus front of the Crimean War	(Russia) Russian Empire: Kutaisi Governorate; Tiflis Governorate; Erivan Governorate; Principality of Mingrelia; Principality of Abkhazia (1853-1855)	Ottoman Empire Ottoman Empire; Principality of Abkhazia (1855-1856)	The victory at the front, but the defeat of Russia in the war
1856-1857	Mingrelian Peasants' Uprising	Mingrelian rebels	Principality of Mingrelia (Russia) Russian Empire	Defeat
1875-1876	Svaneti uprising of 1875–1876	Free Svaneti	(Russia) Russian Empire	Defeat
1877-1878	Russo-Turkish War (1877–1878)	Russian Empire: Kutaisi Governorate; Tiflis Governorate	Ottoman Empire: Trebizond Vilayet; Erzurum Vilayet; Bitlis Vilayet; Van Vilayet; Sivas Vilayet	Victory: Treaty of San Stefano
1914-1918	World War I	Allied Powers: Russian Empire; Georgia within the Russian Empire; France; United Kingdom; Serbia; Belgium; Japan; Montenegro; Luxembourg; Italy (from 1915); Romania (from 1916); Portugal (from 1916); United States (from 1917); Greece (from 1917); China (from 1917)	Central Powers: German Empire; Georgian Legion; Austria-Hungary; Ottoman Empire; Sultanate of Darfur (until 1916); Bulgaria (from 1915); Jabal Shammar (from 1915)	Allied victory: Russia prematurely withdraws from war with the Treaty of Brest-Litovsk

== Georgian Democratic Republic ==
Date	Conflict	Combatant 1	Combatant 2	Result
1914-1918	Caucasus Campaign	Russian Empire (1914–17): Kutaisi Governorate; Tiflis Governorate; United Kingdom (1918); Armenia (1918); Central Caspian Dictatorship (1918) Russian SFSR (1918); Baku Commune (1918)	Ottoman Empire: Trebizond Vilayet; Erzurum Vilayet; Bitlis Vilayet; Van Vilayet; Sivas Vilayet; Azerbaijan (1918); Mountainous Republic of the Northern Caucasus (1918); German Empire (1914–17) German Empire (1918); Democratic Republic of Georgia (1918)	Compromise
1918	Abkhazia conflict (1918)	Transcaucasian Democratic Federative Republic; Democratic Republic of Georgia: Abkhaz People's Council; Supported by: German Empire	Abkhaz Bolsheviks; Supported by: Russian SFSR: Kuban-Black Sea Soviet Republic; Ottoman Empire: Abkhaz Muhajirs	Victory
1918-1919	Sochi conflict	Democratic Republic of Georgia	Russian SFSR South Russia	Inconclusive: Gagra is transferred to Georgia; The rest of Sochinsky okrug is transferred to Russia
1918	Armeno-Georgian War	Democratic Republic of Georgia	First Republic of Armenia	Inconclusive: With the intervention of Great Britain, a truce was concluded between Armenia and Georgia.
1918-1920	Georgian–Ossetian conflict (1918–1920): First Ossetian uprising; Second Ossetian uprising; Third Ossetian uprising	Democratic Republic of Georgia	Ossetian Bolsheviks; Supported by: Russian SFSR	Victory: All Ossetian uprisings were suppressed by Georgians
1918-1920	Georgian–Volunteer conflict	Democratic Republic of Georgia; Allies: Green armies Committee for the Liberation of the Black Sea Governorate; Mountainous Republic of the Northern Caucasus	South Russia	Inconclusive: South Russia absorbed by Soviet Russia
1920	Georgian–Soviet border clashes	Democratic Republic of Georgia	Russian SFSR Azerbaijan SSR	Victory: Red Army attempted invasion repulsed; Treaty of Moscow (1920)
1921	Soviet invasion of Georgia	Democratic Republic of Georgia	Russian SFSR Armenian SSR Azerbaijan SSR	Defeat: Establishment of the Georgian SSR; Exile of the Government of the Democratic Republic of Georgia
1921	Turkish invasion of Georgia	Democratic Republic of Georgia	Ankara Government	Turkey seizes Artvin and Ardahan but fails to conquer Batumi
1921	Svaneti uprising of 1921	(Democratic Republic of Georgia) National Democrats of Georgia	Georgian SSR: Georgian Revkom; Russian SFSR: Red Army; VOKhR	Defeat: Uprising crushed
1921	Kakhet-Khevsureti rebellion	(Democratic Republic of Georgia) Committee for the Independence of Georgia	Georgian SSR: Georgian Revkom; Russian SFSR	Defeat: Flight of Kakutsa Cholokashvili to Southern Chechnya
1924	August Uprising	(Democratic Republic of Georgia) Committee for the Independence of Georgia	Soviet Union, Red Army; Cheka; Georgian SSR	Defeat: Consolidation of Soviet rule in the Georgian SSR

== Soviet period ==
Date	Conflict	Combatant 1	Combatant 2	Result
1941-1945	World War II	Allies: Soviet Union; Georgian SSR; Georgian Divisions; United States; United Kingdom; China; Free France; Poland; Canada; Australia; New Zealand; India; South Africa; Yugoslavia; Greece; Denmark; Norway; Netherlands; Belgium; Luxembourg; Mongolia; Brazil; Mexico; Ethiopia	Axis: Germany; Georgian Legion; Japan; Italy; Hungary; Romania; Bulgaria; Vichy France; Croatia; Slovakia; Thailand; Manchukuo; Mengjiang; Finland; Azad Hind; Iraq; Iran; Iceland	Allied victory
1979-1989	Soviet–Afghan War	Soviet Union: Georgian SSR; Afghanistan	Afghan Mujahideen	Defeat

== Republic of Georgia ==
Date	Conflict	Combatant 1	Combatant 2	Result
1991-1993	Georgian Civil War: 1991–1992 Georgian coup d'état	(Georgia (country)) Pro-Gamsakhurdia forces Supported by: Chechen Republic of Ichkeria	(Georgia (country)) Pro-Shevardnadze forces Supported by: Russia	Shevardnadze's victory: Gamsakhurdia government expunged
1991-1992	South Ossetian war	Georgia	South Ossetia; Russia	Inconclusive: De facto division of South Ossetia into Georgian and separatist-controlled parts
1992-1993	War in Abkhazia	Georgia UNA-UNSO	Abkhazia Confederation of Mountain Peoples of the Caucasus; Russia	Defeat
1998	1998 Gali clashes	(Georgia (country)) White Legion (Georgia (country)) Forest Brotherhood	Abkhazia	Defeat
1998	1998 Georgian attempted mutiny	(Georgia (country)) Government of Georgia • Georgian Army • Georgian Police	Mutineers from the Senaki Military Brigade • Zviadists	Government victory
2000-2002	Pankisi Gorge crisis	(Georgia (country)) Georgia; Supported by: United States Russia	(Chechen Republic of Ichkeria) Chechen militants Mujahideen in Chechnya; Other jihadists	Boeviks withdraw from the gorge
2001–2021	War in Afghanistan	Islamic Republic of Afghanistan: Afghan National Security Forces; Advisers, Non-combat support, & Counter-terrorism operations: Resolute Support: Australia; Czech Republic; Georgia; Role of Georgia in the War in Afghanistan (2001–2021); Germany; Italy; Romania; Turkey; Spain; United Kingdom; United States	(Afghanistan) Taliban al-Qaeda; Haqqani network Hezb-e-Islami Gulbuddin; United Tajik Opposition	Defeat
2001	2001 Kodori crisis	Chechen militants Georgian guerrillas	Abkhazia	Defeat
2003-2011	Iraq War	US-led coalition (invasion phase): United States; United Kingdom; Poland; Australia; (Kurdistan Region) Kurdistan; Iraqi National Congress; MNF–I (post-invasion phase): Republic of Iraq; South Korea; Italy; Ukraine; Georgia; Georgian involvement in the Iraq War; Estonia; Netherlands; Spain; Denmark; Turkey	Ba'athist Iraq (invasion phase) Ba'ath Loyalists; SCJL; Naqshbandi Army; Islamic State of Iraq; Al-Qaeda Mahdi Army; Special Groups; Badr Brigades	Victory
2004	South Ossetian clashes	Georgia	South Ossetia; Russia	Stalemate
2008	Russo-Georgian War	Georgia	Russia; South Ossetia; Abkhazia	Defeat

== See also ==
- List of wars involving Russia
- List of wars involving Armenia
- List of wars involving Azerbaijan
- List of Georgian battles
