= Kız Kulesi, Rize =

Kız Kulesi
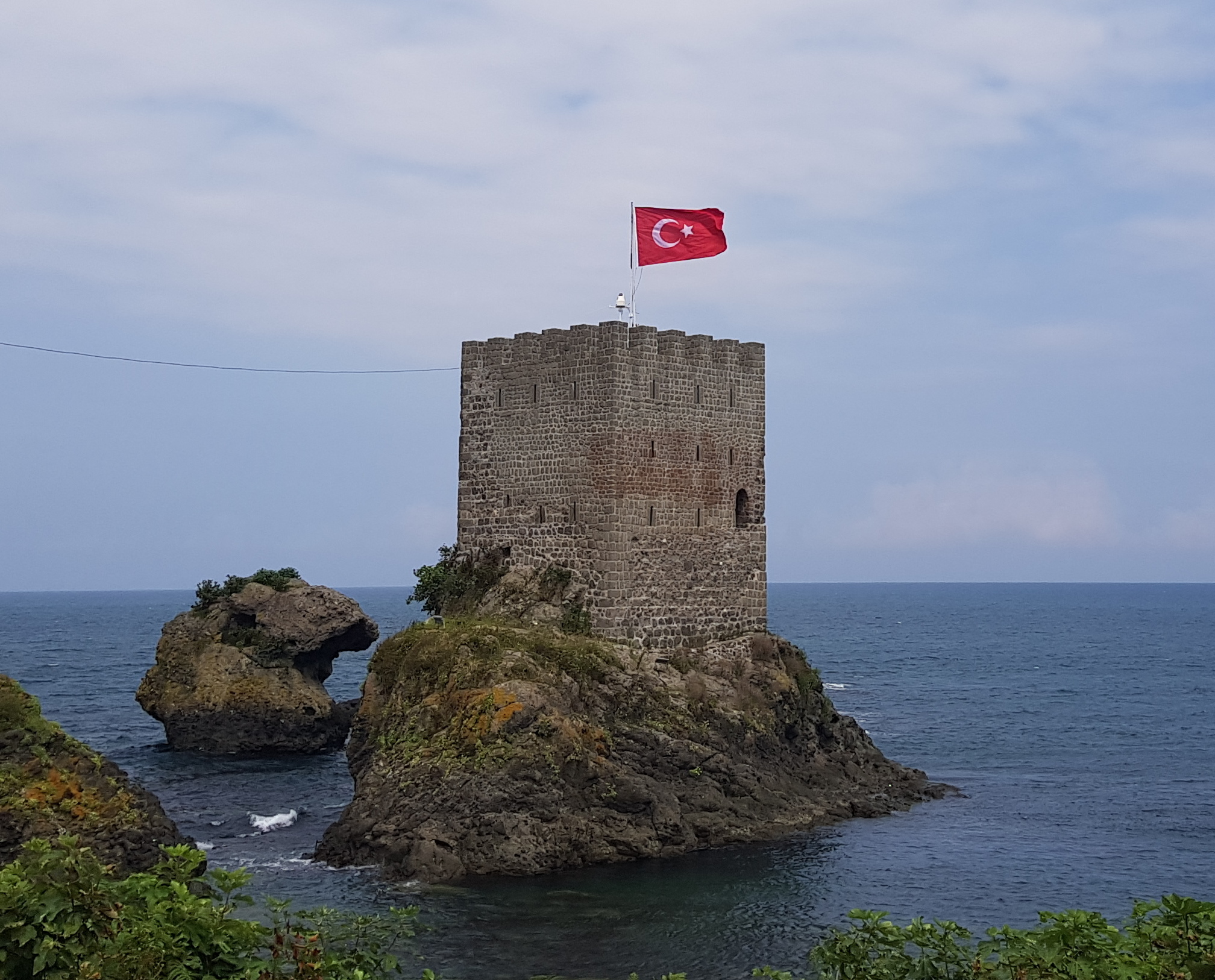

- Location within Turkey

General information
- Type: Castle
- Location: Pazar, Rize Province, Turkey
- Coordinates: 41.182760°N 40.874441°E
- Completed: 13th-14th century

Kız Kulesi is a medieval castle located on small islet, 1 km west of the center of Pazar, Rize Province, Turkey. According to A. Bryer it was built between 13th to 14th centuries, during the time of the Trebizond Empire. According to another sources castle was built by Genoese, as a summer residence for the daughter of a Genoese prince.

Local Laz tradition claims that the castle belonged to Queen Tamar of Georgia, who founded the Empire of Trebizond on the Black Sea coast in 1204 after the Georgian expedition to Chaldia.

== Architecture ==
The interior plan of the tower is about 7 x 7 m. The walls are about 1.5 m thick at ground level. They are faced both in the interior and exterior with regular courses of rectangular blocks. The gateway is in the west wall.

== Gallery ==
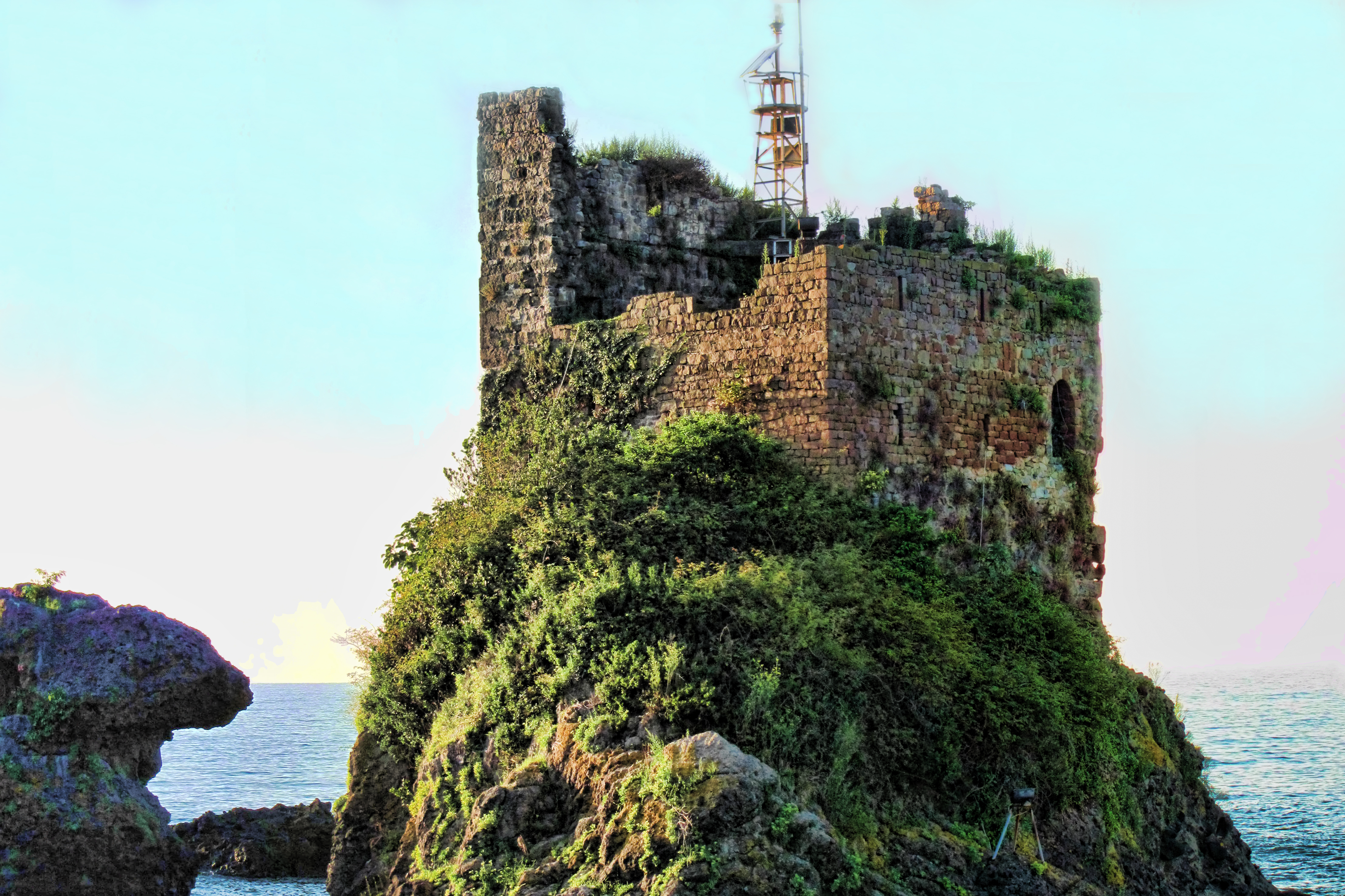
Kız Kulesi being restored in 2013.

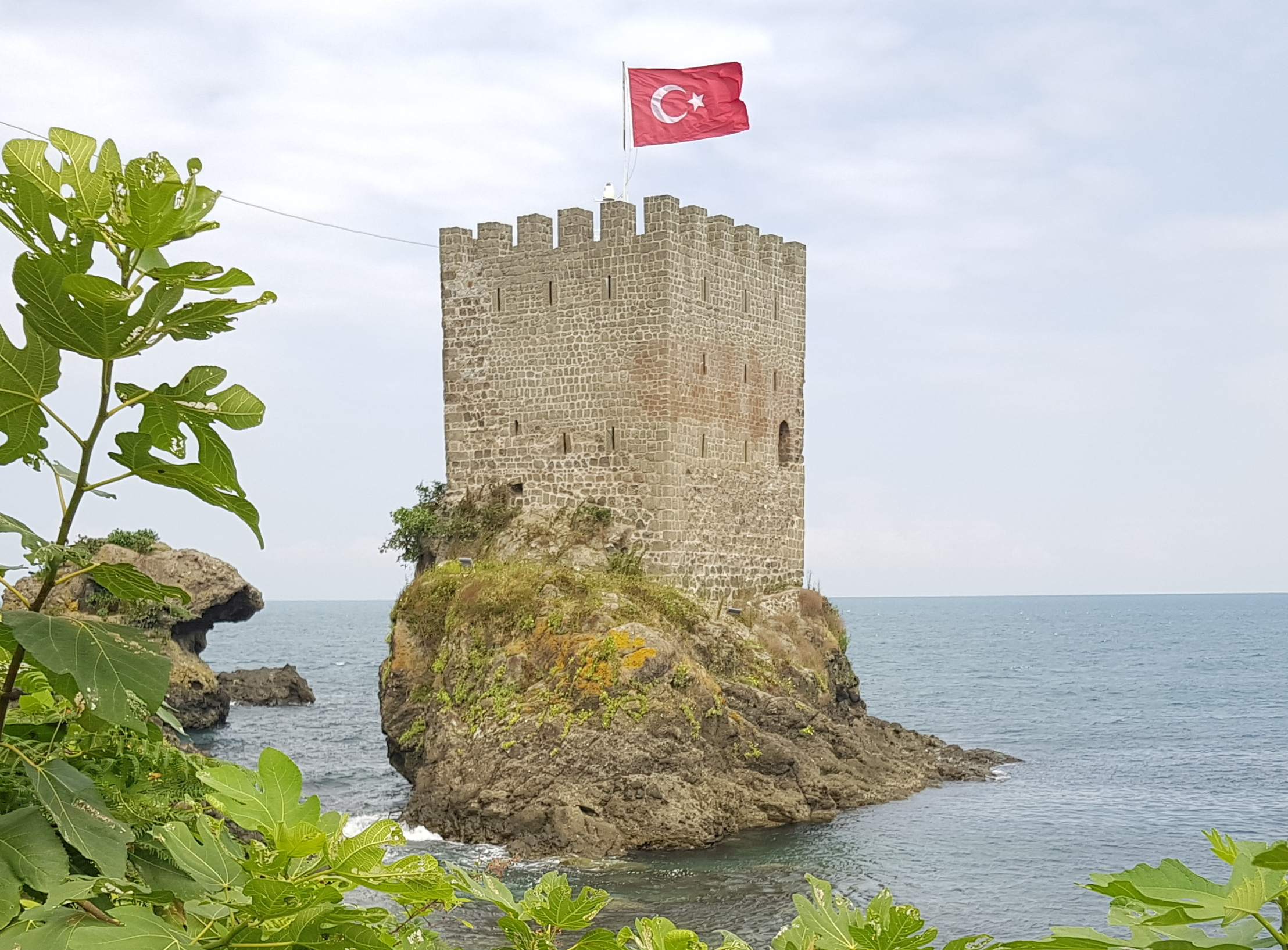
Kız Kulesi in Pazar.
