= List of wars involving Georgia =

List of wars involving Georgia may refer to:

- List of wars involving Georgia (country)
- List of wars involving Georgia (U.S. state)
