= War of the Armenian Succession =

War of the Armenian Succession may refer to:

- Roman–Parthian War of 58–63, war between Roman Empire and Parthian Empire over control of Armenia (AD 58-63).
- War of the Armenian Succession (201–200 BC), ancient conflict in the Kingdom of Armenia between the armies of Artaxias I and Orontes IV the last.
