= Pazar, Rize =

Pazar Laz: Atina
- Municipality
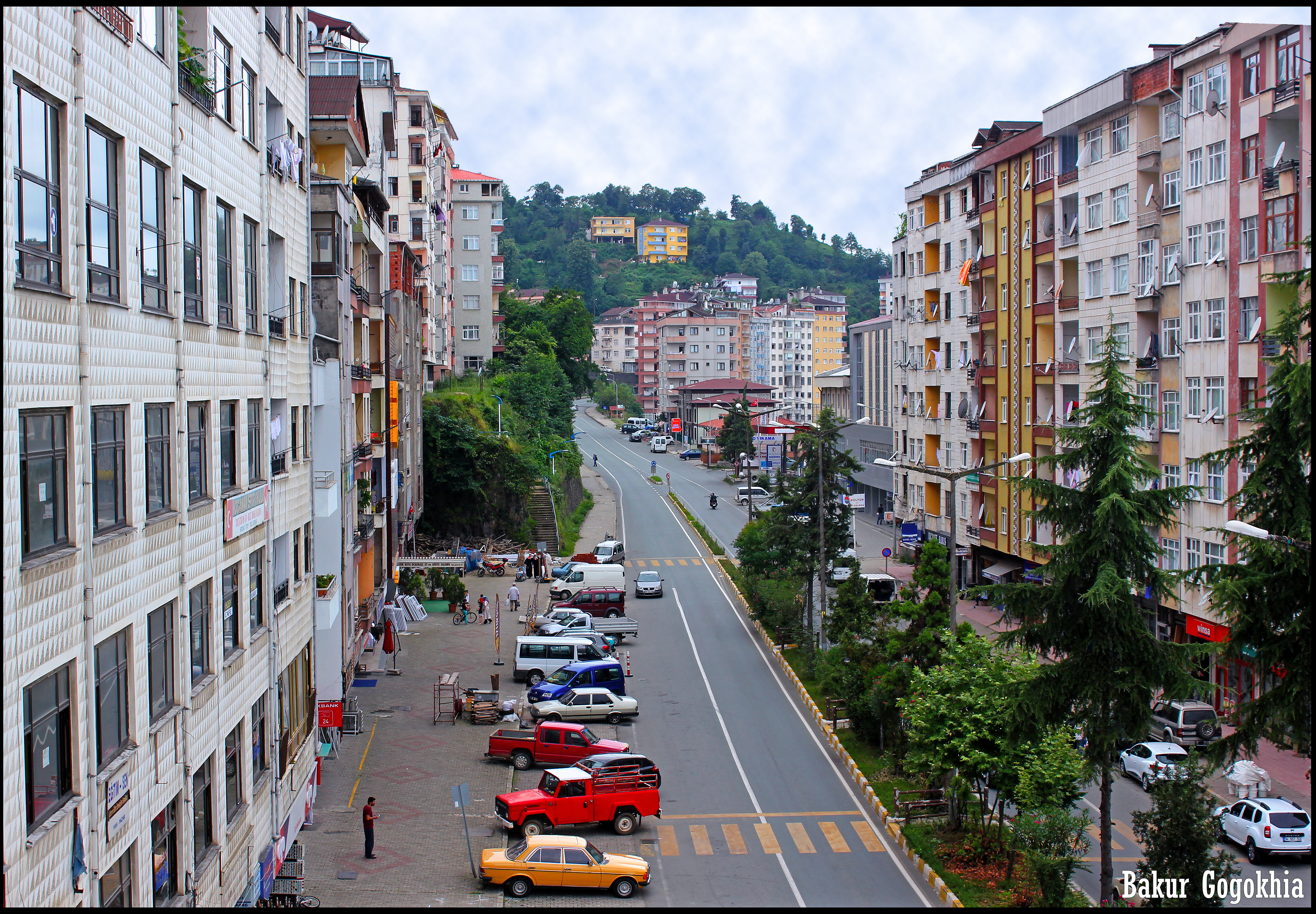

- Location within Turkey
- Coordinates: 41°10′N 40°53′E
- Country: Turkey
- Province: Rize
- District: Pazar

Government
  - Mayor: Neşet Çakır (CHP)
- Elevation: 37 m (121 ft)
- Population (2021): 17,946
- Time zone: UTC+3 (TRT)
- Area code: 0464
- Climate: Cfa
- Website: pazar.bel.tr

Pazar (Laz and Georgian: ათინა, Atina; Greek: Αθήνα, romanized: Athína) is a town in Rize Province in the Black Sea region of Turkey, 37 km east of the city of Rize. It is the seat of Pazar District. Its population is 17,946 (2021). The town contains many inhabitants of Laz and Georgian ancestries as well as other peoples. The town consists of the quarters Gazi, Kocaköprü, Ocak, Beyaztaş, Güzelyalı, Zafer, İkiztepe, Kirazlık, Cumhuriyet, Pazar, Soğuksu and Yukarı Soğuksu.

== Etymology ==
The town was formerly named Atina (Αθήνα του Πόντου) and was renamed Pazar, meaning 'market', in 1928.

According to William Edward David Allen, the word Athenae is a Greek adaptation of the Laz and Georgian word meaning "shadowy".

== Geography ==
The distance between Pazar district and Rize city center is 37 km. The distance can be completed with an average of 40 minutes of vehicle travel. Pazar is a strip of Black Sea coast with high mountains running parallel to the coast inland. This coast has a mild climate with warm summers (22 °C in August) and cool winters (7 °C in January, it rarely snows on the coast), but very wet and humid, apart from the early summer (April–May–June) it rains heavily year round, with an average of 50 sunny days per year. The wind off the Black Sea is cold in autumn, warm and wet in summer.

With all this rainfall the area is very green, and even more water is brought to the area by the many streams bringing rainwater and snowmelt down from the Black Sea mountains, including the Pazar River itself.

This is a hilly district and the main economic activity is tea growing, plus some fishing, trade and light industry (tea processing) in the town of Pazar. Tea was first planted here in 1944 and there are now three factories in Pazar for processing the crop. 65% of arable land in Pazar is used for growing tea. Before tea was planted, citrus fruits and apples were grown here but this has mostly ceased now, apart from trees in family gardens, where people grow vegetables and keep poultry. There are small areas of tobacco, corn, potatoes and beans.

Pazar has plenty of grazing land, including summer grazing in the high mountain pastures (yayla in Turkish) further up the Fırtına River. At even higher altitudes efforts are being made to plant trees but it is hard to put roads through and manage a forest in these steep, high mountains.

Today Pazar is a market town, and the centre of the local tea trade. Fishing was once a major activity and Pazar still has a fleet of small fishing boats although this is in decline as the Black Sea becomes polluted and the traditional anchovies, flathead mullet, red mullet and other species are all in decline.

Until tea was planted, these districts, at the far end of Turkey, were all impoverished, losing many people as migrant workers in Europe or Istanbul. Life is still a struggle, and people still leave although now many return for the tea harvest in summer.

Local handicrafts include basket-weaving and the hand-woven linen Rize bezi. As in much of rural Turkey, women traditionally cover their heads, partly out tradition, partly from practical necessity as they are outside in the wind and rain.

=== Climate ===
Pazar has an humid subtropical climate (Köppen: Cfa). The climate in this area is characterized by mild temperatures and an abundance of precipitation, especially during fall.

Climate data for Pazar (1991–2020)
| Month | Jan | Feb | Mar | Apr | May | Jun | Jul | Aug | Sep | Oct | Nov | Dec | Year |
|---|---|---|---|---|---|---|---|---|---|---|---|---|---|
| Mean daily maximum °C (°F) | 10.1 (50.2) | 10.3 (50.5) | 12.2 (54.0) | 15.4 (59.7) | 19.4 (66.9) | 23.5 (74.3) | 25.8 (78.4) | 26.6 (79.9) | 24.0 (75.2) | 20.3 (68.5) | 15.7 (60.3) | 12.3 (54.1) | 18.0 (64.4) |
| Daily mean °C (°F) | 6.1 (43.0) | 6.3 (43.3) | 8.2 (46.8) | 11.3 (52.3) | 15.6 (60.1) | 19.8 (67.6) | 22.3 (72.1) | 22.9 (73.2) | 19.8 (67.6) | 16.0 (60.8) | 11.1 (52.0) | 8.0 (46.4) | 14.0 (57.2) |
| Mean daily minimum °C (°F) | 3.2 (37.8) | 3.2 (37.8) | 4.8 (40.6) | 7.8 (46.0) | 12.0 (53.6) | 16.1 (61.0) | 19.0 (66.2) | 19.7 (67.5) | 16.3 (61.3) | 12.7 (54.9) | 7.9 (46.2) | 5.0 (41.0) | 10.7 (51.3) |
| Average precipitation mm (inches) | 176.36 (6.94) | 149.32 (5.88) | 128.73 (5.07) | 79.31 (3.12) | 83.37 (3.28) | 130.92 (5.15) | 145.65 (5.73) | 187.33 (7.38) | 261.26 (10.29) | 284.1 (11.19) | 251.19 (9.89) | 236.77 (9.32) | 2,114.31 (83.24) |
| Average precipitation days (≥ 1.0 mm) | 12.6 | 12.4 | 12.6 | 10.0 | 9.3 | 10.2 | 9.7 | 9.9 | 11.1 | 12.4 | 11.0 | 12.3 | 133.5 |
| Average relative humidity (%) | 71.1 | 70.8 | 71.3 | 73.3 | 76.1 | 76.7 | 78.0 | 78.6 | 77.6 | 77.9 | 72.7 | 70.6 | 74.5 |
Source: NOAA

== History ==
The first recorded occupation is the trading colony Αθήνα established here by the Ancient Greeks of Miletos in the 8th century BC. Along with the rest of what is now Rize Province, Athina then became part of the Roman Empire and its successors the Byzantine Empire and the Empire of Trebizond until it was brought into the Ottoman Empire by Mehmet II in 1461, although this coast was always vulnerable to pirates and threats of invaders from across the nearby Caucasus. Indeed, for two years during the First World War Atina was occupied by Russia.

== Places of interest ==
- The watch tower, Kız Kulesi is on the sea front in Pazar.
