= Battle of Tashir =

Battle between Shaddadids and an Armenian–Georgian alliance in 1040

- Part of Shaddadid–Armenian wars and Georgian–Shaddadid wars
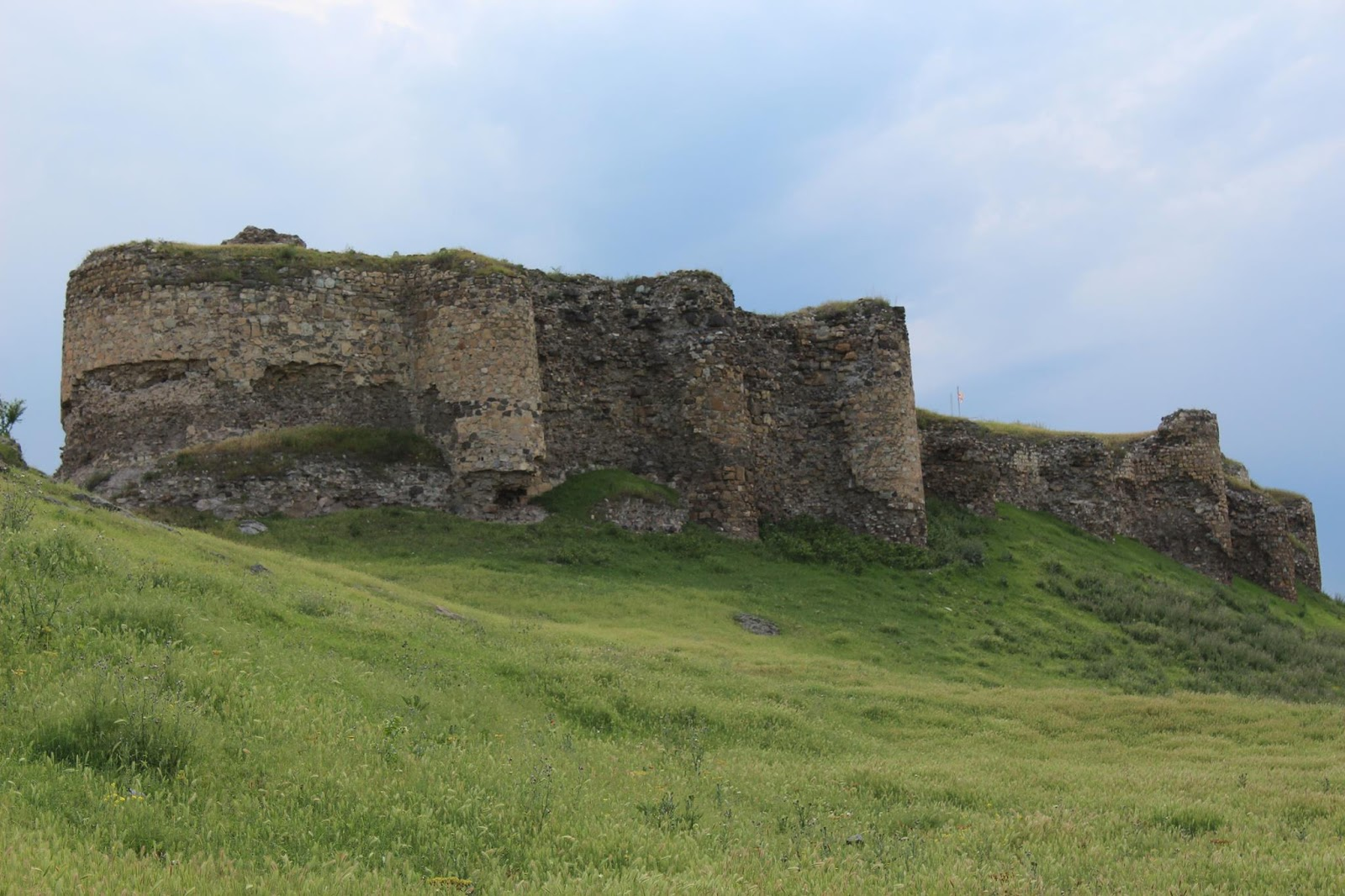
- Fortress of Gagi today
Date	1040
Location	Gagi Fortress, Tashir (modern-day Georgia)
Result	Armenian–Georgian victory

Belligerents
Shaddadid Emirate of Dvin	Kingdom of Tashir-Dzoraget; Kingdom of Ani; Kingdom of Syunik; Kingdom of Georgia

Commanders and leaders
Abu'l-Aswar	David I Anhoghin; Hovhannes-Smbat III; Bagrat IV of Georgia

Strength
150,000 (Matthew of Edessa)	10,000–20,000; 3,000; 2,000; 4,000; Total: ~19,000–29,000

Casualties and losses
Heavy	Unknown

The Battle of Tashir was fought in 1040 between the forces of the Shaddadid emirate of Dvin, led by Emir Abu'l-Aswar Shavur ibn Fadl, and the Bagratid Kingdom of Tashir–Dzoraget under King David I.

== Background ==
Following the death of King Gagik I of Armenia in 1020, his realm fractured among his sons. The Kiurikid branch emerged in Tashir–Dzoraget under King David I, while the Shaddadids consolidated in Dvin under Emir Abu'l-Aswar. By 1040, Abu'l-Aswar—already married into the Armenian royal family—sought to expand his domain into Tashir–Dzoraget.

== Battle ==
In 1040, Abu'l-Aswar Shavur ibn Fadl, ruler of the Shaddadids, marched from Dvin with an army reportedly 150,000 strong, according to the 12th-century chronicler Matthew of Edessa. His objective was the strategic province of Tashir, a key frontier zone contested between Armenian and Muslim forces.

In response, King David I Anhoghin of Lorheti organized a defensive coalition comprising the following:

- 10,000–20,000 of his own Armenian troops
- 3,000 reinforcements from the Kingdom of Ani
- 2,000 troops from Kapan (Syunik)
- 4,000 Georgian auxiliaries under the command of King Bagrat IV

The armies met near the fortress of Gagi, a key fortified point in Tashir.

According to Matthew of Edessa, the battle began with a surprise assault by the troops of Kapan, led by Christian bishops, which inflicted significant casualties on the Shaddadid army. Following this, the combined Georgian-Armenian army, led by David I Anhoghin, Bagrat IV, and Hovhannes-Smbat III of Ani, attacked from multiple directions. The Shaddadid forces, unaware of the full strength of the allied army, panicked and were decisively routed. Matthew of Edessa further recounts that the victors pursued the fleeing enemy for five days, executing a relentless chase that resulted in the slaughter of large portions of the Shaddadid army: "The pursuit was so severe that plains and mountains were covered in blood."

While the numbers and vivid details in Matthew’s account may be exaggerated, modern historians agree that the numerically inferior Armenian–Georgian alliance successfully exploited local terrain and coordinated maneuvers to decisively defeat Abu'l-Aswar’s forces.

== Aftermath ==
The defeat forced Abu'l-Aswar to abandon his claim on Tashir and retreat to Dvin, preserving the independence of the Kiurikid realm. King David I’s victory solidified his position and deterred further Shaddadid incursions for decades.
