= Soğuksu, Pazar =

Soğuksu Shilerit (Laz language)
- Neighbourhood
- Location in Turkey
- Coordinates: 41°10′51″N 40°52′29″E
- Country: Turkey
- Province: Rize
- District: Pazar District
- Municipality: Pazar
- Population (2021): 1,615
- Time zone: UTC+3 (TRT)

Soğuksu is a neighbourhood of the town Pazar, Pazar District, Rize Province, northeastern Turkey. Its population is 1,615 (2021).

== History ==
According to Armenian traveller Minas Bijishkyan's book (1819), name of the village is "Psyxrós", which means "cold water" in Greek. According to list of villages in Laz language book (2009), name of the neighborhood is Shilerit. Most inhabitants of the neighbourhood are ethnically Laz.
