= List of wars involving Azerbaijan =

This is a list of wars involving the Republic of Azerbaijan and its predecessor states, the Azerbaijan Democratic Republic and the Azerbaijan Soviet Socialist Republic.

== List ==
=== Azerbaijan Democratic Republic (1918–1920) ===
| Conflict | Combatant 1 | Combatant 2 | Results |
|---|---|---|---|
| Caucasus Campaign of World War I (1914–1918) | Ottoman Empire; 1918: (Azerbaijan Democratic Republic) Azerbaijan 1918: Germany (Democratic Republic of Georgia) Georgia; Northern Caucasus | 1914–1917: Russian Empire; 1917: Russian Provisional Government; Russian Republic; Russian SFSR; 1917–1918: Transcaucasian DFR; 1918: Armenia; United Kingdom; Centrocaspian Dictatorship; Baku Commune | Inconclusive: See § Aftermath; Independence of Armenia, Azerbaijan, and Georgia; Ottomans cedes Erzurum, Van, Trabzon to Armenia |
| Russian Civil War (1917–1922) | Separatists: Poland; Finland; Ukraine; Belarus; Estonia; Latvia; Lithuania; (Georgia (country)) Georgia; Armenia; Azerbaijan; Northern Caucasus; Basmachi | Bolsheviks: (Russian Soviet Federative Socialist Republic) Russian SFSR; (Byelorussian Soviet Socialist Republic) Byelorussian SSR; (Ukrainian Soviet Socialist Republic) Ukrainian SSR; (Transcaucasian Socialist Federative Soviet Republic) Transcaucasian SFSR; Regional forces; White movement: (Russia) Russian State; South Russia; Anti-Bolshevik left: Left SRs; Green Army; Makhnovshchina; Right SRs and Mensheviks; Allied Powers: Japan; United Kingdom; United States; France; Czechoslovakia; Central Powers: Germany; Austria-Hungary; Ottoman Empire | Bolshevik victory (see § Aftermath): Establishment of the Soviet Union |
| Armenian–Azerbaijani War (1918–1920) | (Azerbaijan Democratic Republic) Azerbaijan; Ottoman Empire; Republic of Aras (1918–1919) | (First Republic of Armenia) Armenia: Russian SFSR; (Azerbaijan Soviet Socialist Republic) Azerbaijani communists; (Armenian Soviet Socialist Republic) Armenian communists; (Ottoman Empire) Turkish revolutionaries (1920) | Inconclusive: Soviet invasion of Armenia and Azerbaijan, and subsequent victory; Sovietization of Armenia and Azerbaijan; Disputes over Karabakh and Nakhchivan settled in favor of Soviet Azerbaijan; Most of Zangezur gained by Soviet Armenia |
| Red Army invasion of Azerbaijan (1920) | Azerbaijan | Russian SFSR (Azerbaijan Soviet Socialist Republic) Azerbaijani Bolsheviks; Supported by: Ankara government | Soviet victory: Overthrow of the ADR government; Establishment of Azerbaijan SSR |

=== Soviet Socialist Republic of Azerbaijan (1920–1991) ===
| Conflict | Combatant 1 | Combatant 2 | Results |
|---|---|---|---|
| World War II (1939–1945) | Soviet Union: (Azerbaijan Soviet Socialist Republic) Soviet Azerbaijan | Germany: Azerbaijani Legion | Victory: 800,000 Azerbaijanis fought in Soviet Army, 400,000 of whom perished.; Up to 40,000 Azerbaijanis, mainly former POW volunteers, fought in the Wehrmacht. |
| Soviet–Afghan War (1979–1989) | Soviet Union: (Azerbaijan Soviet Socialist Republic) Soviet Azerbaijan | Afghan Mujahideen | Defeat: Afghan Mujahideen Victory; Soviet withdrawal from Afghanistan; 10,000 Azerbaijanis fought in Soviet Army, 200 of whom perished. |

=== Republic of Azerbaijan (1991–) ===
| Conflict | Combatant 1 | Combatant 2 | Results |
|---|---|---|---|
| First Nagorno-Karabakh War (1988–1994) | Azerbaijan | Nagorno-Karabakh Armenia (1992–1994) | Defeat; Armenian victory |
| 2016 Nagorno-Karabakh conflict (2016) | Azerbaijan | Nagorno-Karabakh; Armenia | Inconclusive: Inconclusive (see aftermath); Azerbaijan claims victory; Armenia claims to have successfully repelled the Azerbaijani offensive |
| Second Nagorno-Karabakh war (2020) | Azerbaijan | Artsakh Armenia | Victory; Azerbaijani victory |
| Azerbaijani offensive in Nagorno-Karabakh (2023) | Azerbaijan | Artsakh | Victory: 2023 Nagorno-Karabakh ceasefire agreement; Armenian-affiliated Artsakh state dissolved |

== Peacekeeping missions ==
| Mission | Start-date | End-date | Location | Troops (peak) |
|---|---|---|---|---|
| KFOR | 1999 | 2008 | Kosovo | 34 |
| MNF-I | 2003 | 2008 | Iraq | 250 |
| ISAF | 2008 | 2021 | Afghanistan | 94 |

== See also ==
- List of wars involving Russia
- List of wars involving Armenia
- List of wars involving Georgia (country)
- Military history of Azerbaijan
- List of conflicts between Armenia and Azerbaijan
