= List of wars involving Armenia =

This is a list of wars involving Armenia and its predecessor states. The list gives the name, the date, the combatants, and the result of these conflicts following this legend:

Armenian victory
Defeat
Another result (e.g. a treaty or peace without a clear result,
status quo ante Bellum, result of civil or internal conflict, result unknown or indecisive)
Ongoing conflict

== Kingdom of Armenia (331 BC–428 AD) ==
Conflict	Armenian side (and allies)	Opponent	Results	Notable battles
War of the Armenian Succession (201-200 BC)	Forces of Orontes IV	Forces of Artaxias I Supported by Seleucid Empire	Artaxias-seleucid victory: End of Orontid dynasty of Armenia, establishment of Artaxiad dynasty; Seleucid rule in Armenia until 190 BCE	Fall of Yervandashat
Campaigns of Artaxias I (189–165 BCE)	Kingdom of Armenia; Kingdom of Sophene	Atropatene; Kingdom of Cataonia; Kingdom of Pontus; Lesser Armenia; Kingdom of Iberia	Victory: Atropatene comes under Artaxias's zone of influence.; Armenia conquers the regions of Karenitis, Derksen, Akilisene and Antitaurus.	
Seleucid-Armenian War (168–165 BCE)	Kingdom of Armenia; Kingdom of Sophene	Seleucid Empire	Victory: Armenia conquers the region of Tmorik.; 3 years later Antiochus IV Epiphanes is forced to retreat due to internal troubles at home.; Artaxias I captured, but escapes with the aid of Timarchus.	
Parthian invasion of Armenia (120–100 BCE?)	Kingdom of Armenia	Parthian Empire; Atropatene	Defeat: Territorial gains for Parthia; Tigranes II given as a hostage to Parthian court	
Military campaigns of Tigranes the Great (95–78 BCE)	Kingdom of Armenia	Atropatene	Victory: Kingdoms of Sophene, Osroene, Commagene, Atropatene pledge loyalty to Armenia, Tigranes annexes Cilicia Pedias, Mygdonia, and Syria. Launches numerous attacks upon the Kingdom of Cappadocia	
Third Mithridatic War (73–66 BCE)	Kingdom of Armenia; Kingdom of Pontus	Roman Republic	Defeat: Pontus is divided up: one part becomes a client state of Rome, the other a Roman province.; Armenia becomes a client kingdom of Rome.; Tigranacerta destroyed in 69 bc.	Battle of Artaxata (68 BC)
Armenian-Iberian War (38-21 BCE)	Kingdom of Armenia	Kingdom of Iberia; Alans	Compromise: Artaxias II's general and son Zariadres captured, would be released on the following terms: Javakheti, Ardahan, and the Fortress of Demotistsikhe would be ceded to Iberia; A defensive alliance between Armenia and Iberia would be formed	
Antony's Atropatene campaign (36 BC)	Roman Republic; Armenia; Galatia; Cappadocia; Pontus; Herodian Kingdom of Judea	Parthian Empire; Atropatene; Hasmonean Kingdom	Armenian withdrawal: Artavasdes II of Armenia betrays the Romans	
Antony's campaign against Armenia (34 BC)	Armenia	Roman Republic	Defeat: Artavasdes II of Armenia is captured and executed	
Iberian invasion of Armenia (35 AD)	Kingdom of Armenia; Parthian Empire	Kingdom of Iberia; Roman Empire	Defeat: Mithridates installed as king of Armenia	
Iberian–Armenian War (50–53 AD)	Kingdom of Armenia	Kingdom of Iberia	Victory: Tiridates I crowned King of Armenia	Siege of Garni
Roman–Parthian War of 58–63	Kingdom of Armenia; Parthian Empire	Roman Empire; Sophene; Lesser Armenia; Kingdom of Iberia; Commagene; Kingdom of Pontus	Victory: Treaty of Rhandeia; Arsacids established on Armenian throne	
Alan invasion of Parthia (72 AD)	Parthian Empire; Kingdom of Armenia; Media Atropatene	Alans	Defeat: Armenia was plundered but Tiridates I of Armenia managed to escape	
Ardashir I invasion of Armenia (226–238)	Kingdom of Armenia	Sasanian Empire	Victory: After twelve years of fighting against Tiridates II, Ardashir I withdrew his army and left Armenia.; Tiridates II strengthen his positions in Middle East	
Galerius' Sasanian campaigns (296-299)	Roman Empire; Armenia	Sasanian Empire; Kingdom of Iberia; Lakhmid kingdom	Victory	
Shapur II's invasion of Armenia (350)	(Arsacid dynasty of Armenia) Kingdom of Armenia; Roman Empire	Sasanian Empire	Victory: Arsacid Arshak II recognized as king of Armenia	
Julian's Persian expedition (363)	Roman Empire; Armenia	Sasanian Empire; Arab allies	Defeat: Perso-Roman Peace Treaty of 363 forces Rome to renounce its alliance with Armenia and cede it to Persia	
Armeno-Sassanid War (363-371)	(Arsacid dynasty of Armenia) Kingdom of Armenia; Roman Empire	Sasanian Empire	Victory: Reconquest of the lost Armenian territories by Mushegh I; Re-establishment of the Arshakuni king Pap of Armenia	Battle of Dzirav

== Marzbanate period (428-646) ==
Conflict	Armenian side (and allies)	Opponent	Results	Notable battles
Vardan's War (449-451)	House of Mamikonian	Sassanian Empire: Marzbanate of Armenia	Inconclusive: Religious freedom for Armenians	Battle of Avarayr
Vahan's War (481-484)	House of Mamikonian	Sassanian Empire: Marzbanate of Armenia	Victory: Treaty of Nvarsak	Battle of Nersehapat
Red Vardan's revolt (571-572)	House of Mamikonian	Sassanian Empire: Marzbanate of Armenia	Victory: Another attempt by the Sassanids to spread Zoroastrianism among the Armenians failed	
Muslim conquest of Armenia (637-661)	Sassanian Empire: Sasanian Armenia; Byzantine Empire: Byzantine Armenia	Rashidun Caliphate	Defeat: Conquest of Armenia by Arabs	Siege of Dvin (640)

== Ostikanate of Arminiya (661-855) ==
Conflict	Armenian side (and allies)	Opponent	Results	Notable battles
Anti-Arab rebellions (8th century)	Arminiya	Abbasids	Defeat	Battle of Bagrevand, Battle of Vardanakert
Armenian revolt (850-855)	Arminiya	Abbasids	Victory: Estamblishment of Principality of Armenia	Defense of Ktish

== Bagratid Armenia (855-1045) ==
Conflict	Armenian side (and allies)	Opponent	Results	Notable battles
Sajid-Armenian Wars (899-914)	(Bagratuni dynasty) Bagratid Armenia	Sajid dynasty	Defeat: Vaspurakan subjugates into Sajids	Defense of Nakhichevan
Byzantine–Georgian wars (1014-1022)	Kingdom of Georgia (Bagratuni dynasty) Bagratid Armenia	Byzantine Empire	Defeat: Treaty of 1022	Battle of Shirimni and Battle of Svindax

== Zakarid Armenia (1201-1350) ==
Conflict	Armenian side (and allies)	Opponent	Results	Notable battles
Georgian–Seljuk wars (1064-1213)	Kingdom of Georgia: Zakarid Armenia	Seljuk Empire	Victory: Liberation of Tbilisi and most of the South Caucasus	Battle of Didgori
Mongol invasions of Caucasus	Kingdom of Georgia: Zakarid Armenia; Kingdom of Artsakh	Mongol Empire	Inconclusive: Armenia gets fully conquered by mongols, while Hasan-Jalalyans keep their power in Artsakh	Siege of Khokhanaberd

== Cilician Armenia (1080–1375) ==
Conflict	Armenian side (and allies)	Opponent	Results	Notable battles
First Crusade (1096–1099)	Holy Roman Empire; Kingdom of France; Duchy of Apulia; Byzantine Empire; Armenian Kingdom of Cilicia	Great Seljuq Empire; Danishmends; Fatimids; Almoravids; Abbasids	Victory: Kingdom of Jerusalem created; Crusader states created	
Second Crusade (1145–1149)	Kingdom of Jerusalem; County of Tripoli; Principality of Antioch; Kingdom of France; Holy Roman Empire; Kingdom of Portugal; Kingdom of Castile; County of Barcelona; Kingdom of León; Kingdom of Denmark; Byzantine Empire; Kingdom of Cilicia; Kingdom of England; Kingdom of Poland	Seljuq Sultanate; Almoravids; Almohads; Zengids; Abbasids; Fatimids	Defeat in Anatolia: Status quo ante bellum in the Levant; Victory in Iberia: Crusaders capture Lisbon, Tortosa, Wagria, and Polabia	
Armenian–Byzantine wars (1151–1168)	Armenian Kingdom of Cilicia	Byzantine Empire	Victory: Armenians inflicted a heavy defeat to the Byzantine army in the battle of Mamistra; The Byzantine Empire abandoned its pretensions to the Armenian state	
War with Antioch (1156)	Armenian Kingdom of Cilicia	Principality of Antioch Supported by: Byzantine Empire	Compromise: After a short battle near Alexendretta, Raynald of Châtillon was forced to return home, covered with humiliation; Thoros voluntarily surrendered to the Temlpars the fortresses in question, and the Knights took an oath “to assist the Armenians on all occasions where they needed help.”; Having secured the land he wanted, Raynald demanded his subsidies from the emperor who refused them, pointing out that the main task had yet to be done. Raynald quickly sided with Thoros and conspired to attack Cyprus	
Third Crusade (1189–1192)	Holy Roman Empire; Kingdom of England; Kingdom of France; Crusader States: Kingdom of Jerusalem; Principality of Antioch; County of Tripoli; Military Orders; Kingdom of Cilician Armenia; Kingdom of Hungary; Republic of Genoa; Republic of Pisa	Ayyubid Sultanate: Sultanate of Egypt; Emirate of Damascus; Emirate of Hama; Emirate of Mesopotamia; Sultanate of Rûm Nizari Ismaili: Nizari Ismaili state; Christian opponents: Byzantine Empire; Kingdom of Sicily	Victory: Treaty of Jaffa, the result of Crusader military victories and successful sieges.	
War with Antioch (1191/92-1194)	Cilician Armenia	Principality of Antioch	Victory: Treaty of Sis	
War of the Antiochene Succession (1201-1219)	Forces of Raymond-Roupen of Antioch Cilician Armenia and others	Forces of Bohemond IV of Antioch and others	Defeat: Temporary rule in Antioch by Cilician Armenia	
Mongol invasions of the Levant (1260-1323)	Ilkhanate: Cilician Armenia; and others	Mamluks and others	Defeat: Mongols temporarily conquer parts of Levant until repelled by the Mamluk Sultanate	Battle of Mari
Ninth Crusade (1271–1272)	Kingdom of France; Kingdom of Cyprus; Kingdom of England; Kingdom of Cilicia	Mamluks	Defeat: Treaty of Caesarea; Crusader states collapsed	Fall of Montfort Castle
Expulsion of Mongols from Cilicia (1307)	Cilician Armenia	Ilkhanate	Victory: End of Armeno-Mongol alliance; Withdrawal of Mongol forces from Cilicia	Siege of Anazarba
Mamluk-Armenian Wars (1266-1375)	(Armenian Kingdom of Cilicia) Cilician Armenia	Mamluks	Defeat: Fall of the Armenian Kingdom of Cilicia	Fall of Sis

== Armenian national movement (1722-1918) ==
Conflict	Armenian side (and allies)	Opponent	Results	Notable battles
Syunik rebellion (1722-1730)	Melikdoms of Syunik; Supported by (Principality of Khachen) Melikdoms of Artsakh	Ottoman Empire Iran	Defeat: Some resistance continues until the region is reconquered by Iran	Battle of Halidzor
Artsakh liberation struggle (1724-1731)	(Principality of Khachen) Melikdoms of Artsakh; Supported by Melikdoms of Syunik	Ottoman Empire Iran	Victory: Successful resistance until Iranian forces reconquer region	Ottoman invasion of Varanda
Armenian resistance during Hamidian massacres (1890-1907)	Fedayi groups: ARF; Hunchaks; Armenakans	Ottoman Empire	Successful resistance in some places, but couldn't defend whole people	Zeitun rebellion (1895-96)
Armenian resistance during the Armenian Genocide (1914/15-1917/18)	Armenians	Ottoman Empire	Some successful resistance defended people, but massacres in other regions continued	Defense of Van
Caucasus Campaign (1914-1918)	1914–1917:'; Russian Empire: Armenian volunteer units; 1917–1918: Transcaucasian DFR; 1918: Armenia; United Kingdom; Centrocaspian Dictatorship; Baku Commune	Ottoman Empire; 1918: Azerbaijan 1918: Germany; Georgia; Northern Caucasus	Victory: Independence of Caucasian countries	Battle of Sarikamish
Persian Campaign (1914-1918)	Russian Empire (1914-1917): (First Republic of Armenia) Armenian volunteers; British Empire; Assyrian volunteers	Ottoman Empire; Qajar Iran: Azeris; Kurds	Victory: The Fedayi helped the Assyrians to take over West Azerbaijan from the Turks in the Urmia revolt and Battle of Khoy; Overthrow of the Qajar regime a few years later	Battle of Dilman

== First Republic of Armenia (1918–1920) ==
Conflict	Armenian side (and allies)	Opponent	Results	Notable battles
Armenian-Turkish war (1918)	(Armenia) Armenian National Council	Ottoman Empire	Armistice: Treaty of Batum; Establishment of the First Republic of Armenia; Cession of large territories to the Ottoman Empire	Battle of Sardarapat
Armenian–Azerbaijani War (1918–1920)	First Republic of Armenia	Azerbaijan	Indecisive: Battle of Kazakh; Sovietization of Armenia and Azerbaijan; Karabakh and Nakhchivan dispute settled in favor of Azerbaijan; Zangezur came under Armenia's control.	Zangezur Expedition, Muslim uprisings
Georgian–Armenian War (1918)	Armenia	Georgia	Inconclusive: With the intervention of Great Britain, a truce was concluded between Armenia and Georgia.; Lori becomes the Neutral Zone (Lori Neutral Zone).	Battle of Sadakhlo
Turkish and Soviet invasion of Armenia (1920)	First Republic of Armenia	Turkey; Russian SFSR	Defeat: All of Western Armenia is given to Turkey; Rest of Armenia is Sovietized	Battle of Kars

== Soviet Social Republic of Armenia (1920–1991) ==
Conflict	Armenian side (and allies)	Opponent	Results
World War II (1939–1945)	Soviet Union: Soviet Armenia	Germany: Armenian Legion	Victory: 500,000 Armenians fought in the Soviet Army, 200,000 of whom perished.; 20,000 Armenians fought in the American Armed Forces; 10,000 Armenians fought in the French Armed Forces

== Republic of Armenia (1991– present day) ==
Conflict	Armenian side (and allies)	Opponent	Results	Notable battles
First Nagorno-Karabakh War (1988–1994)	Nagorno-Karabakh (Note: Nagorno-Karabakh Autonomous Oblast (NKAO) until 1991.); Armenia (Note: Armenian Soviet Socialist Republic (Soviet Armenia) until 1990 (renamed Republic of Armenia)/1991 (declared independence).); Armenian Revolutionary Federation; Foreign groups: Kuban Cossacks; Ossetian volunteers; Slavic mercenaries	Azerbaijan (from 1991); Soviet Union (until 1991) (Note: Soviet authorities generally sided with Azerbaijan over Nagorno-Karabakh. Soviet troops were present in Nagorno-Karabakh for 2 1/2 years and supported Azerbaijani militias. Soviet troops directly intervened during Operation Ring in April–May 1991 on the Azerbaijani side.); Azerbaijan SSR; Foreign groups: Hezbe Wahdat; Hezb-e-Islami; Grey Wolves; Chechen volunteers; UNA-UNSO; Slavic mercenaries; Turkish volunteers	Victory; Armenian victory: De facto independence of Nagorno-Karabakh Republic and de facto unification with Armenia; Armenian occupation of territories surrounding Nagorno-Karabakh	Battle of Shusha (1992)
2016 Nagorno-Karabakh conflict	Artsakh; Armenia	Azerbaijan	Inconclusive: Inconclusive (see aftermath); Azerbaijan claims victory; Armenia claims to have successfully repelled the Azerbaijani offensive; The line of contact shifted for the first time since 1994; Azerbaijan captures a territory from 800 hectares (8.0 km^{2}) to 2,000 hectares (20 km^{2}), including 2 heights	
Second Nagorno-Karabakh war (2020)	Artsakh; Armenia	Azerbaijan; Turkey (alleged by Armenia) (Syrian opposition) Syrian mercenaries (Note: Denied by Azerbaijan and Turkey.)	Defeat; Azerbaijani victory: Azerbaijan gains control of 72% of Republic of Artsakh territory	Battle of Shusha (2020)

== See also ==
- List of conflicts between Armenia and Azerbaijan
- List of wars involving Azerbaijan
- List of wars involving Georgia (country)
- List of wars involving Russia
- Military history of Armenia
- Syunik rebellion

== Sources ==
- Brzezinski, Zbigniew; Sullivan, Paige, eds. (1997). Russia and the Commonwealth of Independent States: Documents, Data, and Analysis. Washington, D.C.: M. E. Sharpe. ISBN 9781563246371.
- Cornell, Svante E. (1999). "The Nagorno-Karabakh Conflict" (PDF). Report no. 46, Department of East European Studies. Uppsala University. Archived from the original (PDF) on 31 May 2011.
- Cornell, Svante E. (2011). Azerbaijan Since Independence. New York: M.E. Sharpe. ISBN 978-0-7656-3004-9.
- Demoyan, Hayk (2006). "Turkey and the Karabakh Conflict: Summary". Турция и Карабахский конфликт в конце XX – начале XXI веков. Историко-сравнительный анализ [Turkey and the Karabakh Conflict in the 1990s: a Comparative Historical Analysis] (PDF) (in Russian and English). Yerevan. Archived from the original (PDF) on 21 September 2013.
- Panossian, Razmik (2002). "The Irony of Nagorno-Karabakh: Formal Institutions versus Informal Politics". In Hughes, James; Sasse, Gwendolyn (eds.). Ethnicity and Territory in the Former Soviet Union: Regions in Conflict. Routledge. ISBN 9781136342042.
- Papazian, Taline (2008). "State at War, State in War: The Nagorno-Karabakh Conflict and State-Making in Armenia, 1991–1995". The Journal of Power Institutions in Post-Soviet Societies (8): 25. doi:10.4000/pipss.1623. ISSN 1769-7069. "."
- Taarnby, Michael (2008). The Mujahedin in Nagorno-Karabakh: A Case Study in the Evolution of Global Jihad. Real Instituto Elcano. Archived from the original on 5 March 2016.
- Trenin, Dmitri V. (2011). Post-Imperium: A Eurasian Story (PDF). Brookings Institution Press. ISBN 9780870033452. Archived from the original (PDF) on 24 March 2022.
