= Georgian expedition to Chaldia =

1204 military expedition

Georgian expedition to Chaldia (1204)
- Part of Byzantine–Georgian wars and Georgia's interventions in Trebizond
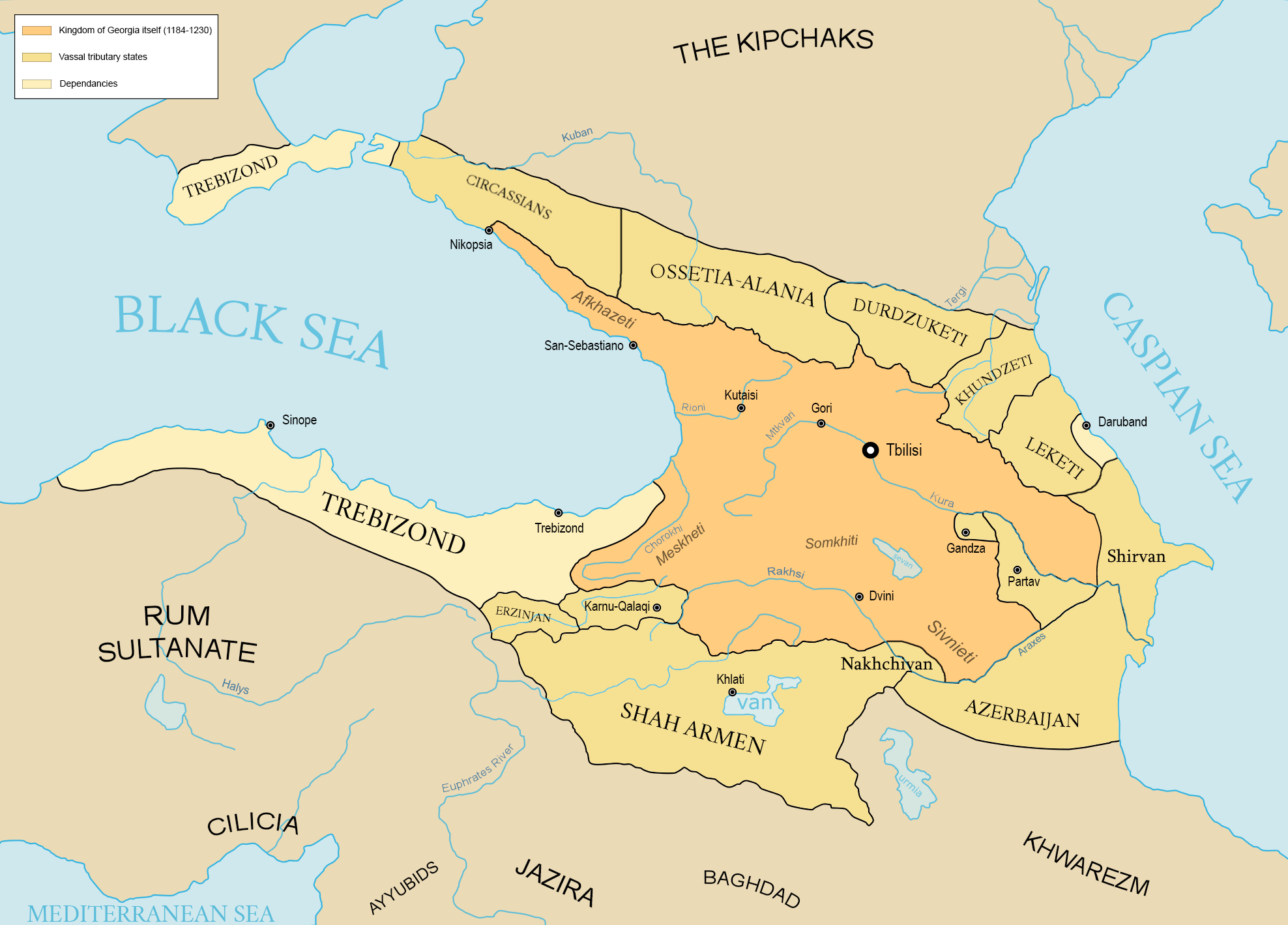
- Kingdom of Georgia at its height, featuring Trebizond in the west.
Date	Early 1204
Location	Chaldia, northeastern Anatolia
Result	Georgian victory
Territorial changes	Founding of the Empire of Trebizond

Belligerents
Kingdom of Georgia	Byzantine Empire

Commanders and leaders
Queen Tamar; Alexios I of Trebizond; David Komnenos	Local Byzantine governors

Strength
Unknown	Unknown

Casualties and losses
Unknown	Unknown

The Georgian expedition to Chaldia (1204) was a military campaign conducted by the Kingdom of Georgia in early 1204 during the reign of Queen Tamar of Georgia. The expedition resulted in the capture of Trebizond (modern Trabzon) and contributed to the establishment of the Empire of Trebizond, one of several Byzantine successor states that emerged following the Fourth Crusade.

The campaign took place amid the collapse of centralized Byzantine authority in Anatolia and the eastern Mediterranean in 1204. Modern historians generally interpret the expedition as a combination of dynastic support for members of the Komnenos family and Georgian strategic expansion along the Black Sea coast.

== Background ==
=== Georgian expansion under Tamar ===
During the late 12th and early 13th centuries, the Kingdom of Georgia emerged as a dominant regional power in the Caucasus. Under Queen Tamar (r. 1184–1213), Georgia expanded its influence into Armenia and eastern Anatolia. Georgian foreign policy during this period combined military campaigns with dynastic alliances.

Members of the Byzantine Komnenos dynasty, including Alexios and David Komnenos, are reported in both Georgian and Byzantine traditions to have received support at the Georgian court prior to 1204.

=== Byzantine instability ===
The Fourth Crusade (1202–1204) culminated in the capture and sack of Constantinople in April 1204, leading to the fragmentation of the Byzantine Empire. Even before the fall of the capital, imperial authority in Anatolia had weakened, particularly in peripheral regions such as Chaldia.

This instability created favorable conditions for intervention by neighboring powers.

== Campaign ==
In early 1204, Georgian forces advanced into the region of Chaldia, centered on the city of Trebizond. Detailed contemporary accounts of the military operations are limited. Later historical analyses suggest that organized resistance was minimal, likely due to the broader political crisis affecting Byzantine administration in the region.

Trebizond was captured in April 1204. Alexios Komnenos was subsequently proclaimed ruler, marking the foundation of the Empire of Trebizond. His brother David Komnenos extended authority westward along parts of the Black Sea coast in the months that followed.

The precise extent of direct Georgian military control remains debated. Some scholars emphasize Georgian strategic planning and sponsorship, while others stress the autonomous ambitions of the Komnenoi.

== Aftermath ==
The capture of Trebizond led to the establishment of the Empire of Trebizond, which would endure until 1461. Although formally independent, the new state maintained dynastic and political ties with Georgia during its early years.

The expedition represented the westernmost projection of Georgian political influence during the period often described as the Georgian Golden Age. It also contributed to the broader fragmentation of Byzantine authority in Anatolia following 1204.

== Historiography ==
Georgian medieval chronicles portray the expedition as part of the broader successes of Queen Tamar’s reign. Byzantine and later Greek traditions place greater emphasis on the role of the Komnenos dynasty in founding Trebizond.

Modern scholarship generally situates the campaign within the wider context of post-1204 state formation in the eastern Mediterranean.

== Bibliography ==
- Bryer, Anthony (1973). "The Foundation of the Empire of Trebizond (1204)". Byzantinische Zeitschrift. 66: 301–322.
- Eastmond, Antony (1998). Royal Imagery in Medieval Georgia. University Park: Pennsylvania State University Press.
- Kazhdan, Alexander (1991). The Oxford Dictionary of Byzantium. New York: Oxford University Press.
- Phillips, Jonathan (2004). The Fourth Crusade and the Sack of Constantinople. London: Jonathan Cape.
- Toumanoff, Cyril (1963). Studies in Christian Caucasian History. Washington, D.C.: Georgetown University Press.
