= Chorzene =

Greek name

Chorzene is a name used in Greek historiography to refer to lands of what is modern day Kars, Turkey.

== History ==
At first, area around Chorzene was part of Diauehi tribal formation before Argishti I would conquer it. Then, after Medean attack to Urartu in 590BC, the region would highly likely get its independence from Urartu. Which is followed by creation of kingdom of Iberia. Roughly controlling the region up until 301-189BC, attack of Artaxias I, king of Armenia.
