= Gagi Fortress =

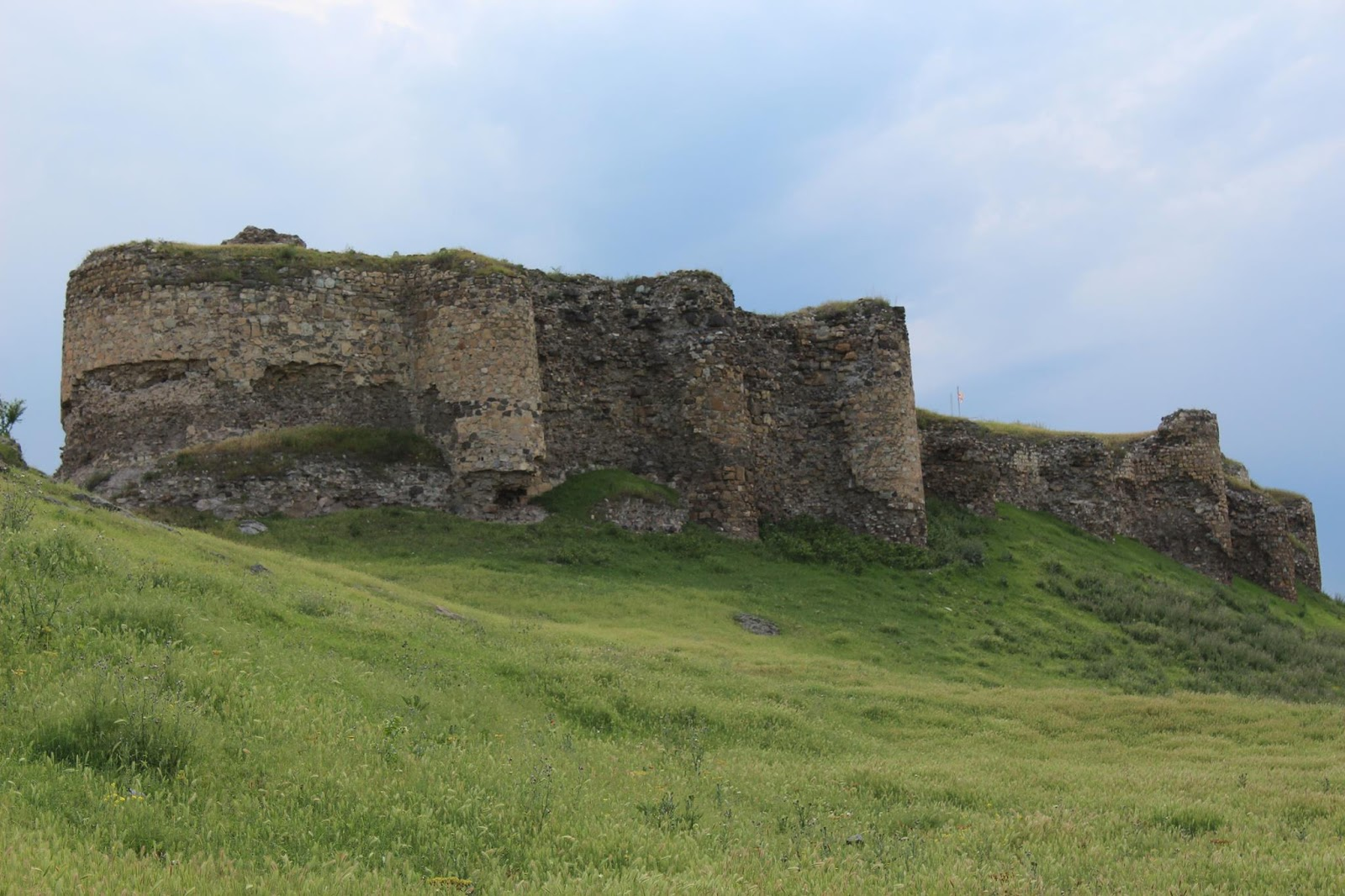
Gagi Fortress, 2017

Gagi Fortress (Georgian: გაგის ციხე; also known as Aghjakala, meaning "white castle") is an 11th-century historic fortress in Marneuli Municipality, Kvemo Kartli, Georgia. The remnants of this fortress stand on the plain of the right bank of the lower Debedi river, near the village of Kushchi in the Marneuli municipality. Historical records first mention the fortress in the 11th century. The Armenian historian Vardan, writing in the 13th century, attributes the construction of the fortress to Gagik I (990-1020), the King of Ani. However, the ruins suggest that the structure predates Gagik I, who likely undertook significant renovations rather than initial construction.
