= Georgia's interventions in Trebizond =

Georgia's military campaigns in the Empire of Trebizond

The Georgian interventions in Trebizond began with the expedition launched by the Georgian queen Tamar in 1204, which helped to establish the Trapezuntine Empire from the rump Byzantine Empire targeted by the Fourth Crusade. The Trapezuntine Empire began as a Georgian client state, allowing the Kingdom of Georgia to expand its influence amidst the power vacuum in the region and establish a buffer state with the Sultanate of Rum and rival Byzantine successor states. Georgia would continue to exert influence in the Trapezuntine politics until the Mongol invasions of Georgia devastated the kingdom. The attempt to regain the influence over the Trapezuntine Empire by Georgia failed in 1282 with the Kingdom of Western Georgia carrying out unsuccessful intervention which despite David VI annexing some eastern Trapezuntine territories saw the Trebizond conclusively drifting away from the Georgian sphere of influence. The resurgence of Georgia under the King George V of Georgia saw another attempt by Georgia to exert influence over Trebizond but in no avail.

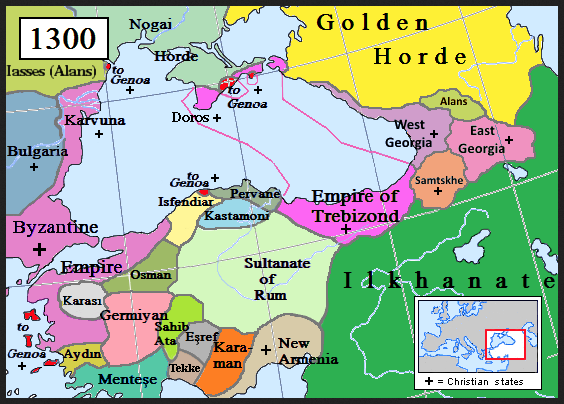
Map of Anatolia and Caucasus in 1300.

== 1204 campaign and the establishment of the Empire of Trebizond ==
When the Fourth Crusade sacked Constantinople in 1204, Alexios and David Komnenos took advantage of the chaos, with military support from Queen Tamar of Georgia they launched an expedition into the regions of Chaldia and Paphlagonia. Georgian forces helped them seize the city of Trebizond and surrounding areas in April 1204. Alexios declared himself emperor founding Empire of Trebizond under the Komnenos dynasty. The Georgian intervention in Trebizond can be understood as a calculated act of statecraft rather than dynastic solidarity. Under Queen Tamar, Georgia had reached the height of its political and military power, the fall of Constantinople allowed Georgia to expand its influence due to the power vacuum, thereby establishing a buffer state between itself, the Sultanate of Rum and rival Byzantine successor states.

Empire of Trebizond began as something close to a Georgian-backed or even a client state in its earliest years, serving as a buffer and as a trade partner to the Kingdom of Georgia. This Georgian assistance was crucial to its survival and independence from the Latin Empire or other Byzantine successor states like Nicaea.

== Later interventions ==
Georgia continued to exert its influence during succession crises and political struggles in Trebizond, especially around the 13th century, often backing factions that suited Georgian interests. During the reign of John II of Trebizond a coup occurred organized by a pro-Georgian faction, leading to John being deposed and captured. Georgian interventions may also be interpreted as attempts to influence internal stability and succession in Trebizond, Georgian rulers selectively intervened during political weakness in Trebizond, suggesting that Trebizond's ruling class accepted Georgian arbitration when internal legitimacy was contested.

In 1282 King David VI of Georgia would intervene militarily, besieging Trebizond to restore Georgian influence following the Mongol invasions. The siege would fail but this showed Georgia's willingness to use military force in Trebizond's internal affairs. Although David I of Imereti failed to capture Trebizond itself, Georgian forces did annex eastern border regions of the Empire of Trebizond, but these gains were strategically fragile and could not translate into lasting control over Trebizond or major economic centers, it was a minor success for Georgia. Unlike 1204, Georgia did not re-establish Trebizond as a Georgian client state, instead Trebizond began increasingly turning towards Turkish beyliks and Byzantium rather than Georgia, the 1282 campaign is often seen as the last significant Georgian offensive operation beyond the Caucasus.

After 1282, Kingdom of Georgia lost its influence in Trebizond. Through luck and diplomacy the Empire of Trebizond managed to survive the Mongol invasions, although the Mongols greatly devastated Georgia and they also destroyed the Turks Seljuks. This diverted the terminus of the Silk Road to Trebizond effectively making it a funnel of trade between the east and the west. Even Marco Polo went through the city on his return from China. The realignment of the silk road delivered economic growth for Trebizond and it carried on prosperous trade relations with Italian maritime republics. However, the Venetians and the Genoese would forcibly establish trading colonies in Trebizond. In the 14th century Alexios II Megas Komnenos achieved the furthest southern expansion of the Empire of Trebizond to the city of Erzurum. Following Alexios's death, the empire descended into civil war for over a decade. The Byzantine influence supplanted the Georgian in the Trebizond with the Andronikos III killing his pro-Georgian half-brothers Aghbugha and Aza Khutlu. In July 1341 the army of George V of Georgia and local Laz people overthew Irene Palaiologina and installed Anna Anachoutlou on the throne of Trebizond, but her rule only lasted for a year as the Byzantines and Genoese deposed and killed her in 1342. The civil war in Trebizond ended with John III Megas Komnenos taking the throne, however John was later replaced by Michael I Megas Komnenos. Trebizond's enemies would take advantage of the internal unrest, Genoa would seize the city of Kerasus and the Turks would conquer some border territories. On top of this, the Black Death ravaged Trebizond. At the end of 1349 CE Michael was deposed and thus began the rule of Alexios III of Trebizond, during his reign Trebizond rebounded and it maintained its position as a major trade center. During the rise of the Ottoman Empire Trebizond allied with Timur who defeated the Ottomans in the Battle of Ankara, But the Ottomans did not fall. The Ottomans would besiege Trebizond in 1442 CE and again in 1456 forcing Trebizond to pay tribute, but after Mehmed II found out that Trebizond was intriguing with European powers to invade the Ottoman Empire, in just one month Mehmed would conquer Trebizond.
