= War of the Armenian Succession (201–200 BC) =

Ancient conflict in the Kingdom of Armenia

War of the Armenian succession
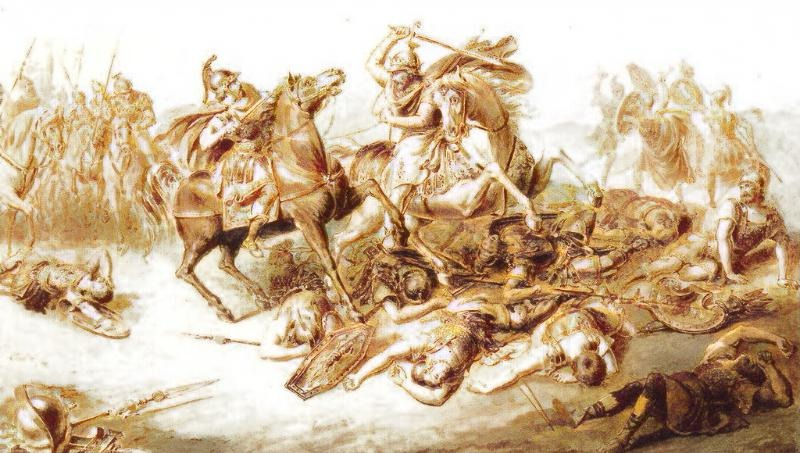
- Gisak Dimaksean defending King Artaxias I
Date	201–200 BCE
Location	Greater Armenia
Result	Artaxias-Seleucid victory: End of Orontid dynasty and establishment of the Artaxiad dynasty; Seleucid rule in Greater Armenia until 190 BCE

Belligerents
Forces of Artaxias I Supported by: Seleucid Empire	Forces of Orontes IV Supported by: Nakharar forces (tmpr.); Kingdom of Iberia

Commanders and leaders
Artaxias I Smbat Bagratuni; Gisak Dimaksean †; Zariadres Antiochus III	Orontes IV †; Argam of Muratsyan (surrendered)

Units involved
Seleucid armies from Atropotane and Assyria	Armenians, iberians, troops from Caesarea, Nakharar forces

Casualties and losses
Unknown	Heavy Unknown number of killed and surrendered armies

The War of the Armenian Succession of 201–200 BC (Note: These events are also known by people as "Yervand and Artaxias" (Armenian: Երվանդ և Արտաշես, romanized: Yervand yev Artashes) and are written by Movses Khorenatsi in his work History of Armenia) was an ancient conflict in the Kingdom of Armenia between the last Orontid Armenian king, Orontes IV, and Artaxias I, who was supported by Smbat Bagratuni. The conflict spread to some regions of Greater Armenia, including Ayrarat and Utik. The decisive battle of the conflict took place at Yervandashat, which ended with the murder of Yervand IV. Artaxias then ordered Smbat to move to Bagaran and kill Orontes' brother, Mithras, thus ending the Orontid dynasty in Greater Armenia. The dynasty continued to rule in Sophene and Commagene. After these events, the Seleucids started their rule in Armenia. Artaxias in Armenia and Zariadres in Sophene became Seleucid rulers, strategos, until they gained independence after the Battle of Magnesia in 190/89 BCE.

== Background ==
=== Reign of Yervand, murder of the sons of Sanatruk, and the escape of Artaxias ===
After the death of King Sanatruk, there was some confusion in the kingdom, because a certain Yervand, son of a woman of the Arsacid dynasty, took the throne. The stories about him are as follows: A giant, big-eyed woman from the Arsacid dynasty, a beautiful woman whom no one dared to marry, gave birth to two children in an illegal marriage. When the children grew up, they named them Yervand and Yervaz. Yervand, as he grew up, became a kind-hearted and strong-willed man. Having been appointed by Sanatruk as a supervisor and leader in many affairs, he became famous, becoming the first among all the Armenian nakharars, and, with his humility and generosity, won everyone over to his side. When Sanatruk died, everyone unanimously made him king, but without a crown prince from the Bagratuni dynasty.

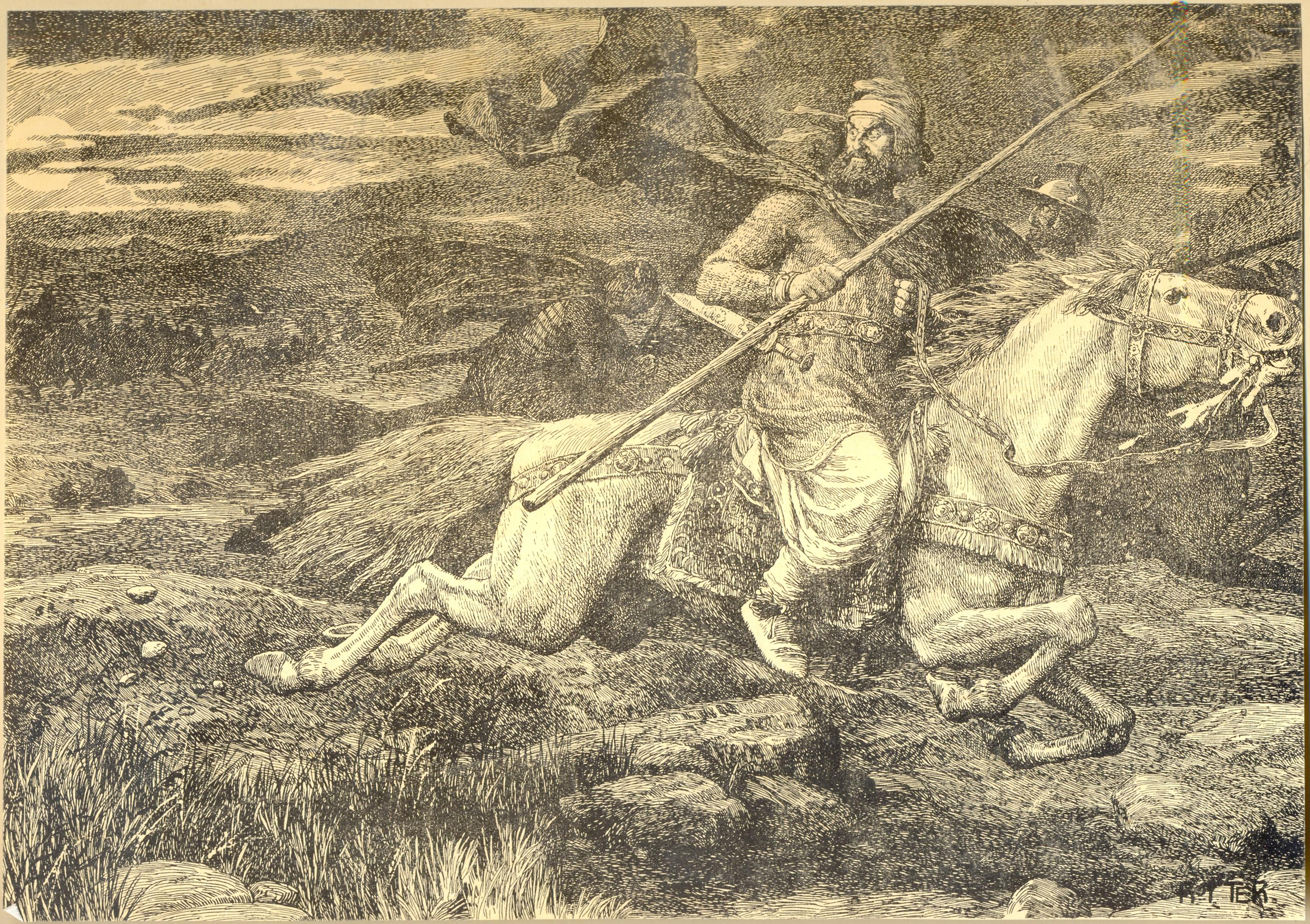
King Yervand IV (220-201/0 BCE)

However, after Yervand became king, suspecting Sanatruk's sons, he massacred them all. It seems that the revenge for the massacre of Abgar's sons was fulfilled. The foster mother of a little boy named Artaxias took him. She took him to the areas of province of Her, the pastoral stations of Maghkhazan. She sent a message to his nurse Smbat, the son of Byurad Bagratuni, in the village of Smbatavan in the province of Sper. Now, when Smbat heard the news of Sanatruk's death and the massacre of his sons, he left his two daughters in Baberd, and he himself went with his wife and a few people to search for Artaxias. Hearing this, Yervand sent scouts to capture them. Smbat, disguised and on foot, fled with the child through the mountains and fields. He hid in pastoral stations until finding an opportunity to escape to Parthia. Since Smbat was a brave man and well-known in advance, he was given great honor by the Persian military leaders, and the child also lived with the king's sons, who had been given places to live in the provinces of Bat and Volhom (Voghomn).

=== Yervand's attempts to capture Artaxias and the abandonment of Mesopotamia ===
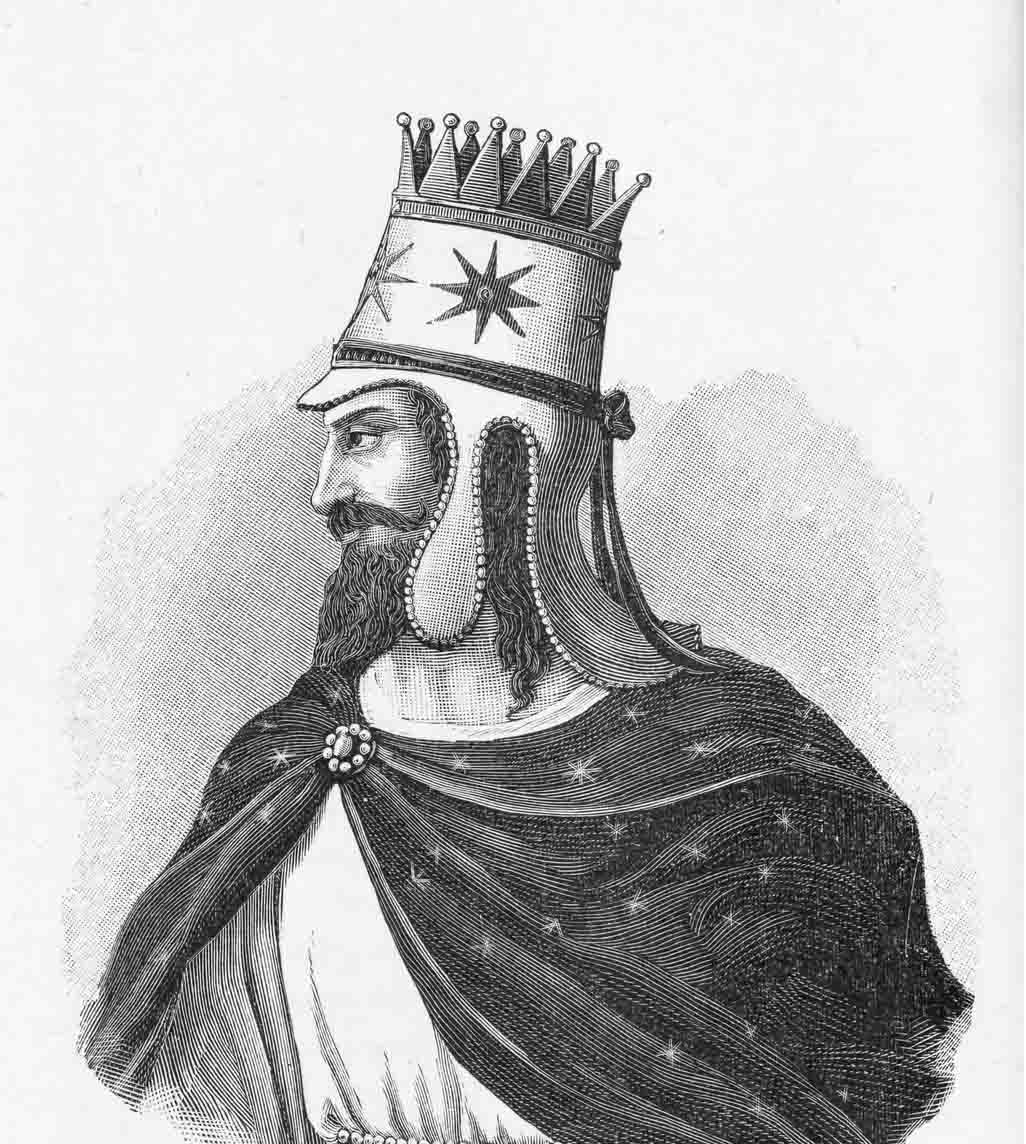
King Artaxias I (189-160 BCE)

Orontes IV grew increasingly concerned regarding potential threats from Media; his reign was marked by instability and apprehension. Always worrying about this when he was awake, he also saw terrible dreams on this occasion in his sleep. Therefore, through the hands of deputies and gifts, he tried to persuade the Persian king to give him the child Artaxias into his hands.

My blood relative and my friend, why do you nourish that Median Artaxias against me and my kingdom, listening to the words of the robber Smbat, who says that Artaxias is the son of Sanatruk, and is trying to turn the son of shepherds and herders into Arsacid, spreading the news that he is your blood relative. He isn't the son of Sanatruk, but Smbat, deceived, has found a Median boy and is blabbering.

— Yervand to the Parthian king

Many times, he sent people to Smbat, asking, "Why are you suffering so much for nothing? You are being deceived by the mother-in-law and are raising that child against me?" He received unpleasant answers. At that time, Yervand sent people to Bayberd and massacred the brave men defending the fortress, and took Smbat's daughters captive and locked them in the Ani fortress in not bad conditions. Through the efforts of Yervand, Smbat, having been treated with contempt and hostility by the Parthian elite, was forced to leave Parthia and enter service in the army of Seleucid Antiochus III.

During the reign of Vespasian and Titus, Yervand left Mesopotamia to the Romans, turned them to his side, and no longer felt threatened from this side. From this time on, Armenian rule disappeared from Mesopotamia, and Yervand paid even higher taxes than Armenia did. And the Roman agents equipped the city of Edessa in every way, establishing treasuries there to receive the taxes they collected from Armenia, Mesopotamia, and Assyria. They also gathered all the courts there and founded two schools: one local Assyrian and the other Greek. They transferred the tax office there, as well as the court of justice that was located in the Pontic city of Sinop.

=== Smbat's petitions to the Persian ministers to place Artashes on the paternal throne ===
When Artaxias reached adulthood and Smbat had demonstrated his valor, the court ministers interceded with the king to grant him whatever reward he asked for. The king agreed and said to the ministers, "Find out what that brave man wants". They said: "Immortal benefactor, Smbat does not want anything else, but only that you establish in his kingdom your blood relative and relative Artaxerxes, the son of Sanatruk, who is deprived of his kingdom." The king agreed. He gave Smbat the hand of the Assyrian army and the troops of Atrpatakan, so that they could take Artaxerxes and establish him on the throne of his homeland.

=== Getting the news to Yervand and mustering troops for war ===
Yervand heard in the province of Uti arandznak, that the King of Persia had gathered a large army under the command of Smbat, to come against him and bring his kingdom to the child Artaxerxes. Yervand, hearing this, left many of his nakharars as partisans there. He himself hurried to his city to gather to him the troops of the Armenian, Georgian, and Caesarean sides, as well as those of Mesopotamia, asking for and paying tribute. It was spring days, so all the troops were soon gathered to him. Argam, the heir of the Azhdahak tribe, the chieftain of the Muratsian tribe, also came with numerous infantry troops, because Yervand had returned to him the secondary throne, which Tigran had taken from him and given to his sister's husband Mihrdat, and after his death had not been given to anyone. Yervand not only helped Argam but also honored and generously rewarded all the nakharar and troops.

And Smbat, with the child Artaxerxes, was in a hurry to reach the borders of the Uti Arandznak. There, he was met by the local troops, as well as the ministers whom Yervand had left there. Hearing this, many of the ministers left and considered separating from Yervand, especially when they saw that the Roman troops did not arrive. Yervand increased his gifts even more, and the more he gave, the more hated he became, because everyone knew that it was not from generosity that he was wasted, but from fear, and he did not become so beloved of those to whom he gave abundantly, as he hated those to whom he did not give so abundantly.

== War ==
=== The battle in Uti Arandznak ===
Smbat and Artaxias ascended the shores of the Sea of Gegham (Note: In ancient Armenia, Lake Sevan was often called Sea of Gegham or Geghama sea (Armenian: Գեղամա ծով, romanized: Geghama ts'ov, lit. 'Sea of Gegham')), behind Mount Aragats. They were in a hurry to reach Yervand's army. They did not attach importance to the number of his troops; they only respected Argam Muratsyan because he was a brave man and had many warriors under his command. Yervand's army was far from his city, at 300 stadions, and was located on the Akhuryan River. When Yervand heard of Smbat's approach, he led the entire number of his troops not far from the latter's army and confronted them. And Artaxias sent a message to Argam with firm oaths, that he would leave him what he had received from Yervand and add other things, only if he would leave Yervand and step aside.

Flag of Artaxiad dynasty (189 BCE-12 AD)

When the banners of Artaxias appeared before the troops of Yervand, Argam took his troops and retreated. As the Armenian historian Movses of Khoren describes, Smbat signaled the advance, moving the vanguard forward, and his forces charged the opposition. And the Armenian ministers, who formed the right and left wings of Yervand's front, mixed and joined him. The Georgian troops, led by their king, attacked but soon fled. Here, the massacre of the Yervand and Mesopotamian troops took place. As the two fronts mixed, brave men from Taurus came out against Artaxias, who had promised Yervand that they would kill Artaxias at the cost of their lives. They were met by Gisak, the son of Artaxias's stepmother, who entered the fray and killed him and won, during which half of his face was cut off with a sword, and he died in this deed, while the remaining troops fled.

=== Escape of Yervand, fall of his city, and his death ===
Yervand, having passed many arenas on horseback and having mounted new horses from his army at the inns built from the city, fled from one inn to another. Smbat, pursuing him, rode fiercely at night to the city gate. And the Medes' troops, having passed by the side of Yervand's regiment, set up camp on the corpses. Artaxias, having reached Yervand's tent, around which he had drawn a fence with leather and canvas sails, got down and stayed in his tent for the night, and when it was day, he lordly ordered the slain to be buried. The valley where the Medes had set up their army, he called Marats Mard, and the place of the battle he called Yervandavan, that is, he drove Yervand here. Then Artaxerxes marched to Yervandashat and ordered the army to shout together "Mar amat", which translates as "the Mede has come", recalling the insult that Yervand had been sent to the Parthian king and Smbat about him. It was with this sound that he named the city "Marmet", probably at the will of Artaxias, that Yervand's name would be removed from the city's name.

Smbat, following Yervand with a small detachment, guarded the city gate until Artaxerxes and all the troops arrived. When the troops began to attack the fortress, the fortress's people surrendered and opened the city gate. One of the soldiers entered Yervand's private room, hit Yervand on the head, and scattered his brain on the floor of the house. (Note: According to historian Hakob Manandian, this episode is reflected in one of the fragments of ancient tragedies discovered in Armavir. In one fragment, a messenger informs the king's sister that the king perished while defending the capital. Another fragment contains references to the names Orontes and Mithras, suggesting a possible connection to the final period of the Orontid dynasty. These dramatic fragments provide literary evidence that may correspond to the historical events surrounding the fall of King Yervand IV and the subsequent division of Greater Armenia.) Thus the last Orontid king was defeated and died after reigning for 20 years. But Artaxerxes ordered him to be buried and a tomb to be erected because Yervand was a member of the Arsacid dynasty. Following the death of King Yervand IV, Greater Armenia was divided between Artaxias and his brother Zariadres. This territorial division is corroborated by the ancient geographer Strabo, who notes that the division occurred only after the reign of Yervand IV. According to Strabo: "The last ruler of Armenia was Orontes... Then Artaxias and Zariadres, the generals of Antiochus the Great, divided the country into two parts. They ruled under the authority of the king".

== Aftermath ==
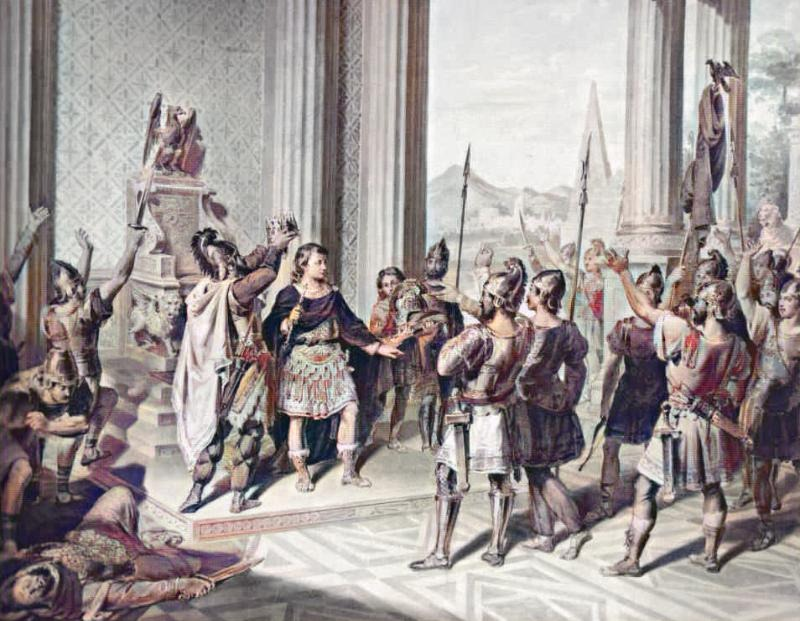
Coronation of Artaxias I

With these events, the Orontids ended their rule in Greater Armenia, but they became Roman client kings of the Kingdom of Sophene and Commagene. Years later, after gaining independence from the Seleucid Empire, Smbat entered the royal palace, found the crown of Sanatruk and put it on the head of Artaxias, thus making him a King of Armenia. Artaxias became the founder of one of the most powerful dynasties in the history of Armenia, the Artaxiad dynasty.

== See also ==
- History of Armenia
- Artaxiad dynasty
- Orontes IV
- Orontid dynasty
- Seleucid Empire
