= Georgian–Shaddadid wars =

1012–1199 wars in the South Caucasus

- Part of Georgian–Seljuk wars
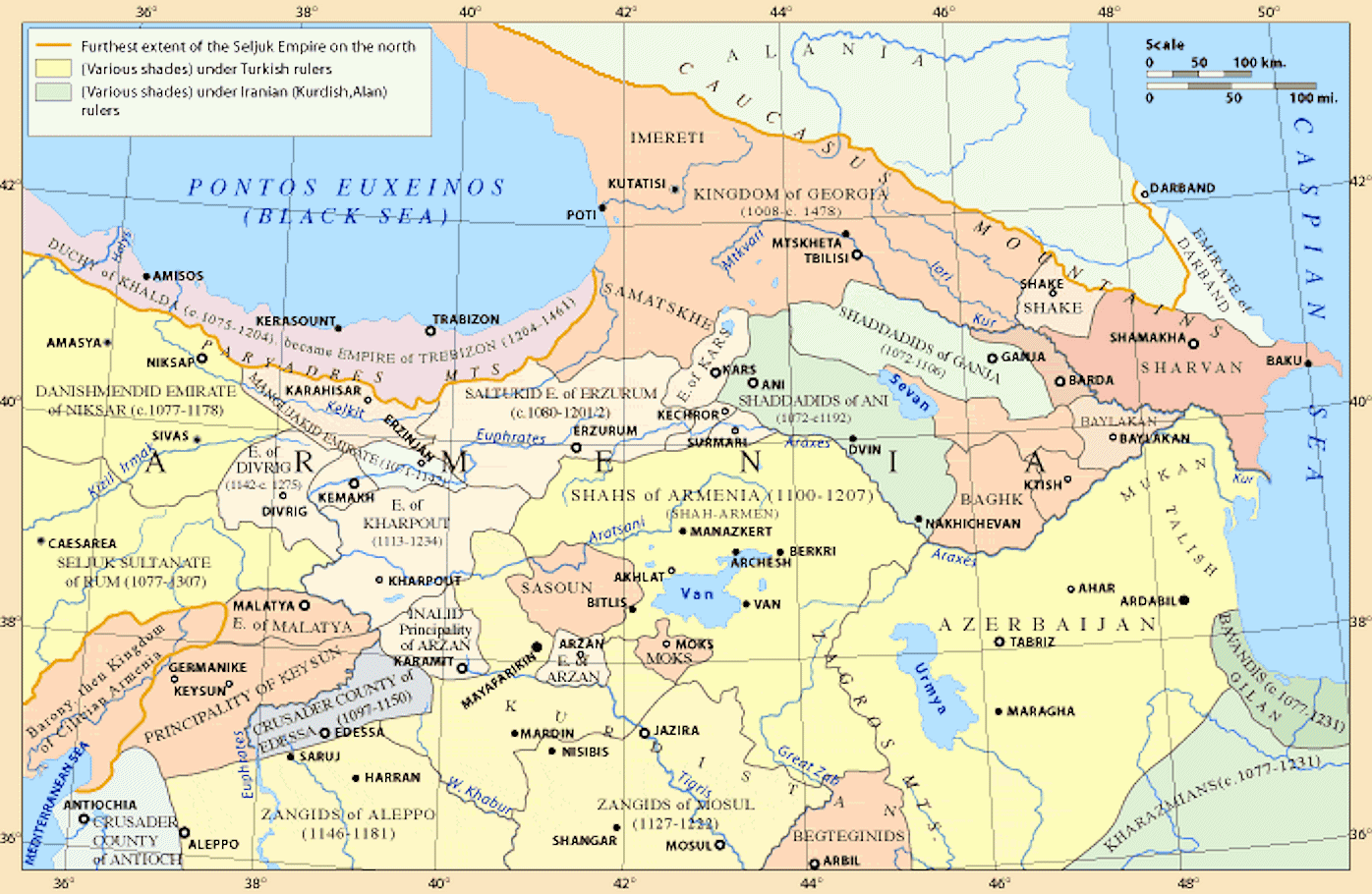
- Map of the Shaddadids ( , ), 11th-12th centuries CE
Date	1012–1199 (187 years)
Location	Caucasus
Result	Georgian victory: Fall of the Shaddadid dynasty

Belligerents
Kingdom of Georgia: Various allies and vassals	Shaddadids: Various Muslim states

Commanders and leaders
Bagrat III; George I Bagrat IV; Aghsartan I (surrendered); David IV # George III # Tamar; Liparit IV of Kldekari (POW)	Fadl I (surrendered); Abu'l-Aswar I # Lashkari II; Anushirvan; Abu Mansur; Fadl II (POW); Manuchihr ibn Shavur; Abu'l-Aswar II (POW); Shanshah (POW); Mahmud II (surrendered)

The Georgian–Shaddadid wars were a series of medieval conflicts between the Kingdom of Georgia and the Muslim Shaddadid dynasty over control of strategic cities in the South Caucasus, particularly Ani and Tbilisi. Beginning in the early 11th century and lasting until the end of the 12th, these wars saw shifting alliances, repeated sieges, and decisive Georgian victories under kings like Bagrat IV, David IV, and Tamar the Great. The wars culminated in the eventual annexation of Shaddadid territories and the fall of the dynasty.

== Background ==
Following the decline of Arab authority in the South Caucasus, the Shaddadids emerged as a Sunni Muslim dynasty of Kurdish origin, ruling key cities such as Dvin, Ganja, and later Ani. Their rise coincided with the consolidation of the Georgian Bagratid monarchy, which sought to expand its influence southward into historically Armenian and Caucasian territories. This strategic expansion brought Georgia into direct conflict with the Shaddadids, sparking a series of wars motivated by territorial ambition, religious rivalry, and the desire to control major trade and military routes in the region.

== History ==
1012: Bagrat III of Georgia successfully besieged Shamkir, forcing the Shaddadids to pay tribute until his death.
1026: King George I of Georgia launched another siege of Shamkir, but was ultimately defeated.
1030: While returning from a successful campaign against Georgia, Emir Fadl I was ambushed and defeated, reportedly losing 10,000 men.
1034: The poet Qatran Tabrizi praised Lashkari II for his victory over Armenian and Georgian princes during his stay in Ganja
1040: King Bagrat IV of Georgia dispatched 4,000 Georgian auxiliaries to assist the Armenians. The allied forces defeated Abu'l-Aswar at the Battle of Tashir.
1049: When Lashkari ibn Musa died in 1049, Anushirvan ibn Lashkari succeeded him, but he was still underage, and real power lay with the chamberlain (hajib) Abu Mansur, who served as regent. Abu Mansur immediately agreed to surrender several frontier fortresses to the Kakhetians, the Georgians and Byzantines, in order "to restrain their greed for Arran".
1053: Abu'l-Aswar seized the (unidentified) fortress of Basra from the Georgians, and refortified and garrisoned it with many men.
1064–1068: The Seljuk sultan Alp Arslan invaded Georgia with the support of Shaddadids and vassalized many leaders such as Aghsartan I of Kakheti
1068: Emir Fadl II invaded Georgia with a force of 33,000 men but was defeated and captured by local ruler Aghsartan I. In exchange for his release, Fadl ceded several fortresses along the Iori River. King Bagrat IV ransomed him and restored a local emir in Tbilisi under Georgian vassalage.
1074: An army of 25,000 under Aghsartan I and George II defeated a combined Shaddadid–Seljuk force of 48,000 at the Battle of Partskhisi.
1104: David IV defeated a Shaddadid army led by Manuchihr ibn Shavur at the Battle of Ertsukhi, nearly capturing the emir.
1121: The Battle of Didgori resulted in a decisive Georgian victory over the Seljuks, who had been supported by the Shaddadids.
1124: King David IV of Georgia successfully besieged Ani, liberating the city and much of northern Armenia from Muslim control.
1164: Eldiguzids captured Ani from Georgians and later gave it to Shaddadids
1174: King George III of Georgia once again besieged and captured Ani from the Shaddadids.
1196: The Zakarids, supported by the Georgians, successfully captured Amberd.
1199: Queen Tamar of Georgia besieged Ani for the final time, effectively ending Shaddadid rule and deposing their last ruler, Sultan ibn Mahmud.

== Aftermath ==
Continuous Georgian military pressure throughout the 11th and 12th centuries gradually weakened Shaddadid power. The decisive blow came during the reign of Queen Tamar, when Georgian forces captured Ani in 1199, deposing the last Shaddadid ruler. The former Shaddadid territories were absorbed into the Georgian and Zakarid domains, bringing an end to Muslim emirates in northern Armenia and solidifying Georgia’s status as a dominant regional power in the South Caucasus.

== Sources ==
- Bosworth, C.E. (1997). The Cambridge History of Iran: The Saljuq and Mongol Period. Vol. 5. Cambridge University Press. ISBN 9780521200936.
- Frye, R. N. (1975). The Cambridge History of Iran. Vol. 4. Cambridge University Press. ISBN 978-0-521-20093-6.
- Minorsky, Vladimir (1953). Studies in Caucasian History. Cambridge University Press. ISBN 9780521057356.
- Minorsky, V. (1993). Houtsma, M. Th.; van Donzel, E. (eds.). E. J. Brill's First Encyclopaedia of Islam, 1913–1936. Brill. ISBN 90-04-08265-4.
- Rayfield, Donald (2012). Edge of Empires: A History of Georgia. London: Reaktion Books. ISBN 9781780230306.
- Peacock, Andrew (2011). "Shaddadids". Encyclopædia Iranica.
