= Battle of Sadakhlo =

1918 battle of the Armeno-Georgian War

- Part of the Armeno-Georgian War
Date	December 22 – 31, 1918
Location	Sadakhlo village and station, Borchalu uezd
Result	Inconclusive: Armenian capture of village and station (Dec 23); Strategic stalemate by ceasefire (Dec 31)

Belligerents
First Republic of Armenia	Democratic Republic of Georgia

Commanders and leaders
Drastamat Kanayan	Grigol Giorgadze (Note: Minister of War); Giorgi Mazniashvili (from December 23) (Note: Major General); Varden Tsulukidze (until December 23) (Note: Brigade general)

Strength
12 companies (Dec 23 offensive)	1,000 infantry 1 cavalry squadron 1 armored train

Casualties and losses
Heavy losses (Dec 22)	130 prisoners (Dec 23); 3 locomotives captured 100+ freight cars captured

The Battle of Sadakhlo was a military battle fought from 19 to 23 December 1918, between the First Republic of Armenia and the Democratic Republic of Georgia during the 1918 Armeno-Georgian war. The battle was one of the most significant events during the war between Armenia and Georgia; the village saw its strategic railway station and village change hands multiple times during fierce combat.

== Background ==
Following the Armenian capture of Hairum and Akhtala on December 16–17, the Georgian commander, General Varden Tsulukidze, was forced to flee toward Sadakhlu in such haste that he left behind his personal rail coach. By December 18, Georgian forces had been driven back along the entire front toward the village. To bolster the defense, the Georgian Minister of Military Affairs, Grigol Giorgadze, personally led reinforcements consisting of 1,000 infantrymen, a cavalry squadron, and the last available armored train into Sadakhlu on December 18.

== The Battle ==
=== Armenian Capture (December 22–23) ===
Armenian forces initially attempted to raid Sadakhlu on December 22, but they sustained heavy losses for the first time in the war when they came within range of the Georgian armored train. Despite this setback, Armenian commander Drastamat Kanayan ordered twelve companies into a full-scale offensive the following day. After hours of "fierce pitched combat," the Armenians captured the village and railway station. This victory yielded a significant bounty, including three locomotives, over 100 freight cars laden with food and ammunition, and 130 Georgian prisoners of war. Following this defeat, the "disgraced" Tsulukidze was relieved of his command and replaced by General Giorgi Mazniashvili.

=== The Final Contest (December 29–31) ===
After the Georgians successfully retrieved Shulaver on December 28, the focus of the conflict returned to Sadakhlo. For the next two days, the village was the site of a "brisk contest," changing hands several times as both armies struggled for dominance.

On the morning of December 31, the final day before the Allied-imposed ceasefire, battles raged all day. While the Armenian left flank was driven back due to a typhus outbreak, their center and right made strategic gains, occupying the heights east of the village and outflanking Georgian positions to cut the rails at Mamai.

== Aftermath ==
When the last shot was fired at midnight on December 31, neither side held total control of the area. Armenian forces had entrenched themselves at the Sadakhlu railway station, while Georgian forces held the town itself. The final irregular front line left Armenians dominating sites to the east, north, and south of Sadakhlu, while Georgians had penetrated a considerable distance to the southwest.

The inconclusive nature of the battle led both sides to claim victory; Georgians asserted they would have driven the enemy back if not for the truce, while Armenians contended they were on the verge of completing the encirclement of Georgian forces at Sadakhlu.
