= Mastara Church =

5th-century church in Aragatsotn, Armenia

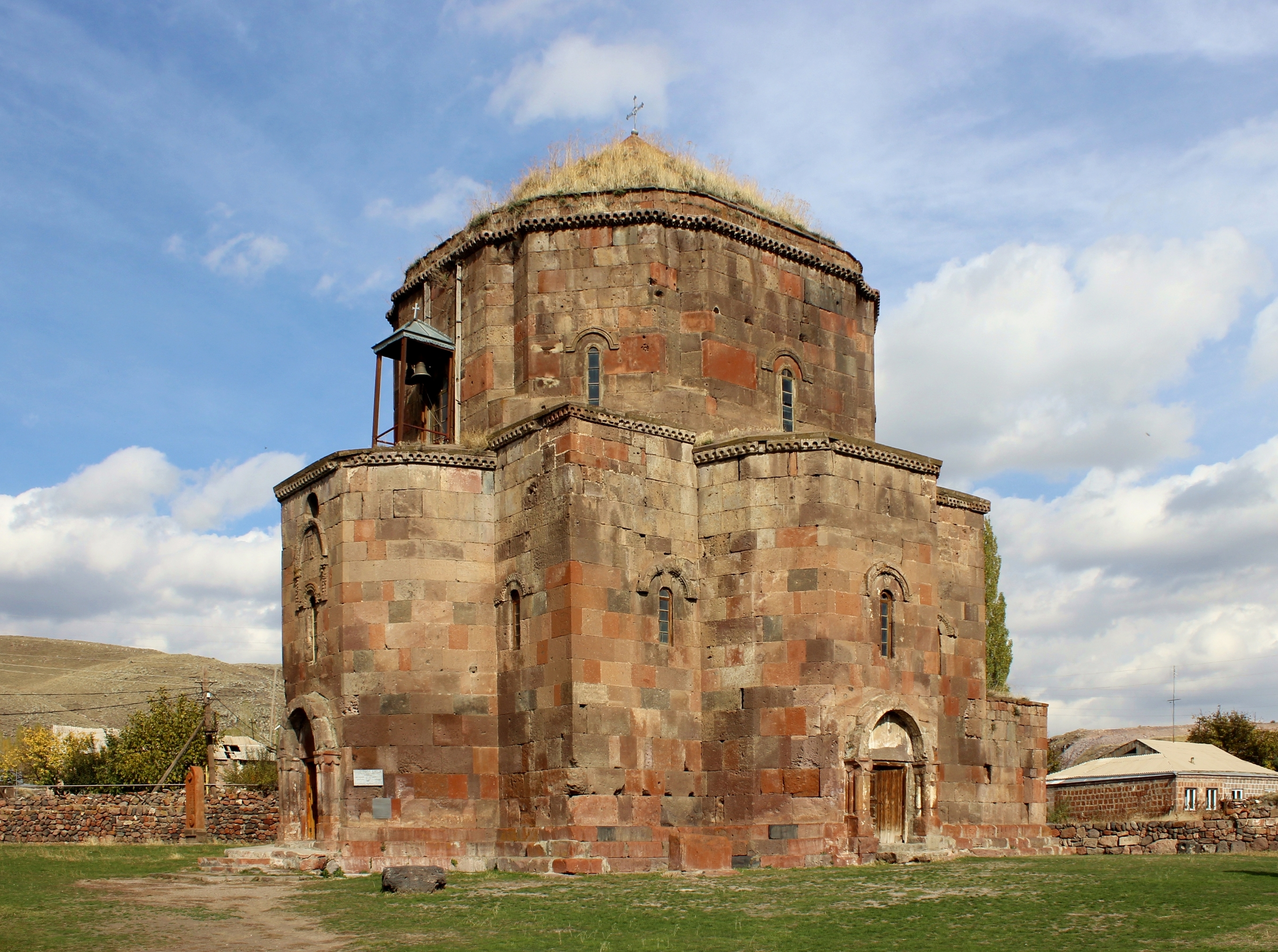
- St. John Church of Mastara, October 2014; View from the southwest

- Location within Armenia Location within Aragatsotn

Religion
- Affiliation: Armenian Apostolic Church

Location
- Location: Mastara, Aragatsotn Province, Armenia
- Coordinates: 40.451631°N 43.883883°E

Architecture
- Style: Armenian
- Completed: 5th century

The Mastara Church (Armenian: Մաստարայի եկեղեցի), also known as Church of Saint John (Surb Hovhannes) in an early medieval church in Mastara, Armenia. It features a variation of the cruciform plan and central domed church.

== History ==
The church was believed to be constructed in the 5th century AD but had numerous renovations. Tradition holds that Gregory the Illuminator, the man who brought Christianity to Armenia, buried relics from Saint John the Baptist within the foundations of Mastara Church. In the 18th century, the church was fortified as a fortress but ceased to be used as a church in 1935 and was turned into a farm storehouse. This was because of the Communist anti-religious policy of the Armenian Soviet Socialist Republic whilst they were a part of the Soviet Union. It was reopened as a church in 1993.

== Design ==
The church was constructed whilst Armenia was part of the Byzantine Empire and thus was forced to follow Byzantine architecture styles. In accordance with its square plan, the four projecting apses, inward-facing circular and outward facing polygonal, offer the requisite supports to hold up the imposing polygonal cupola. The complex church designs are like those in Avan and St. Hripsime Church, Echmiadzin. The church is believed to have been renovated in the 10th century but this did not change the domed structure. The church has a number of 7th century AD religious paintings on its walls. The art had been plastered over with plain walls and were not rediscovered until the 21st century.

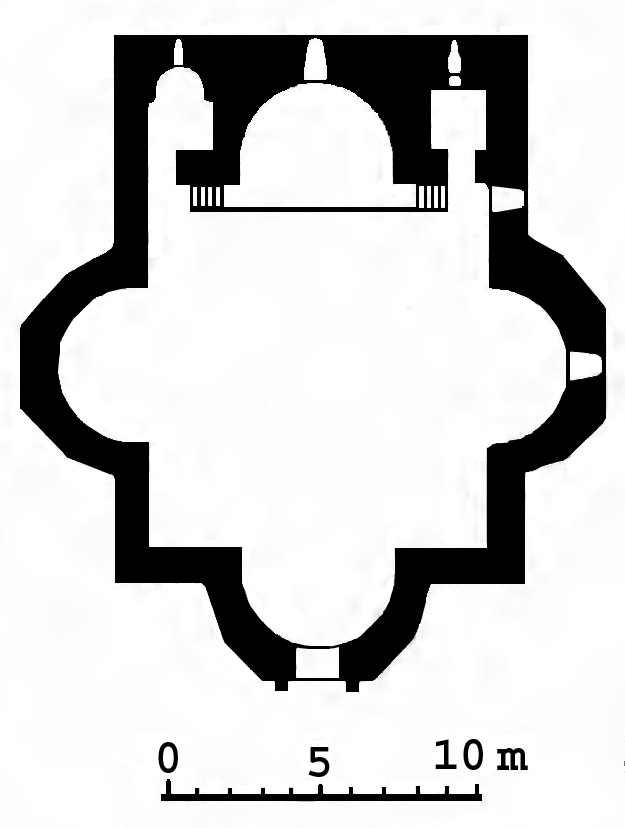
Plan of Church of Saint John

== Gallery ==
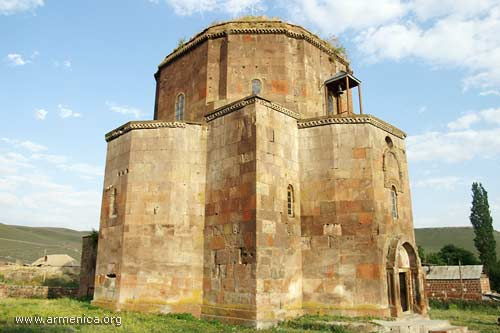
View from the northwest

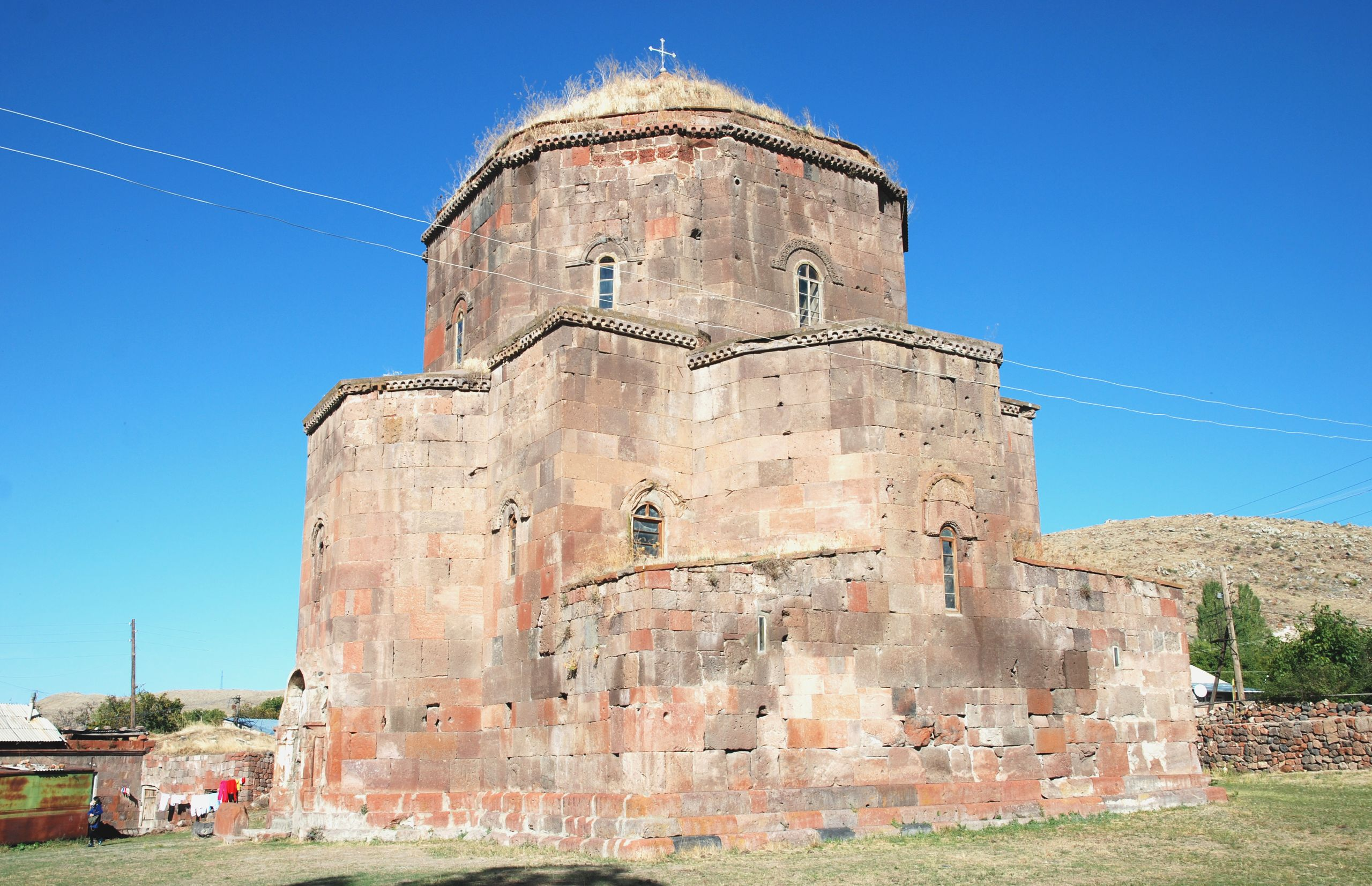
View from the southeast

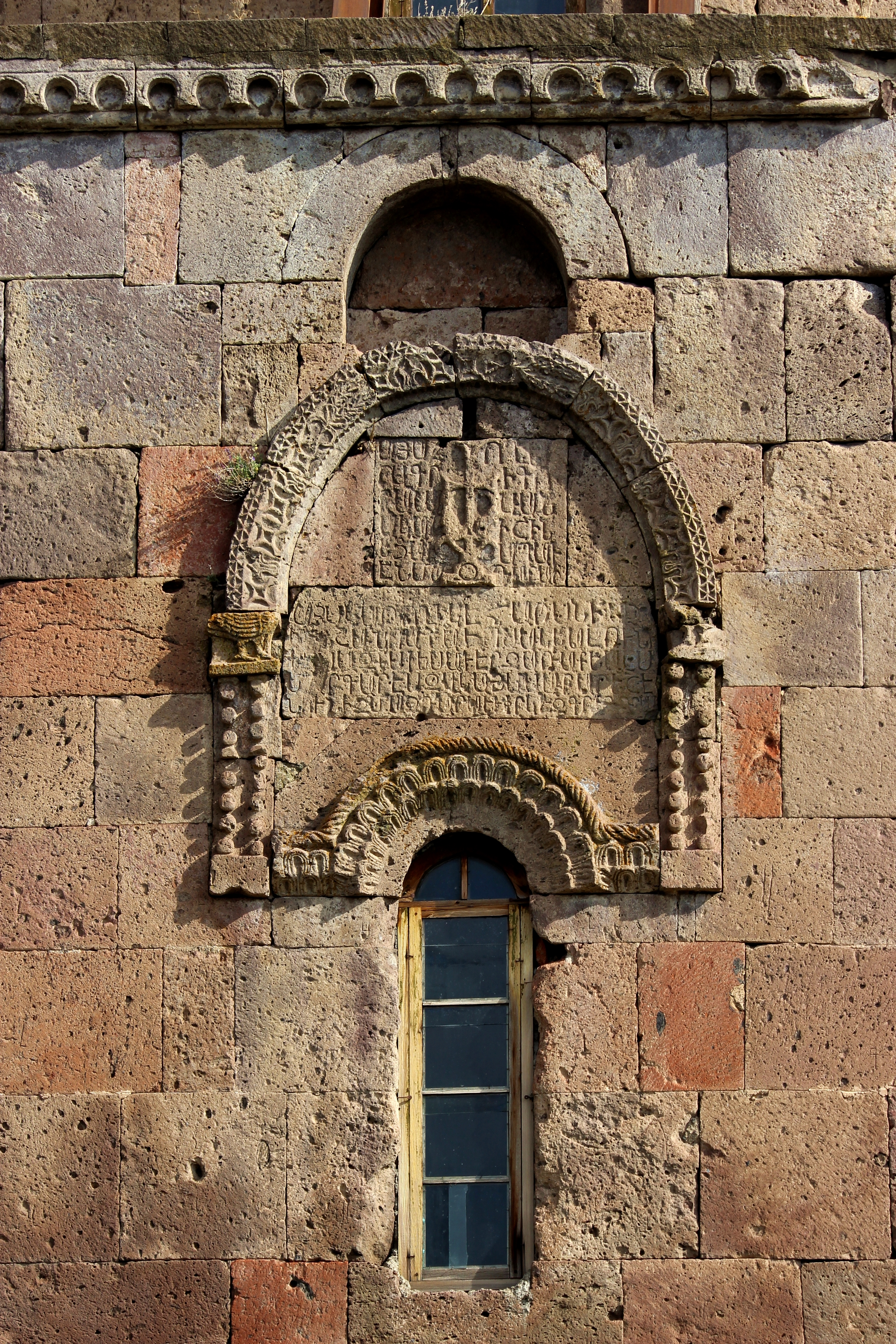
Detail of inscriptions above the western entrance.

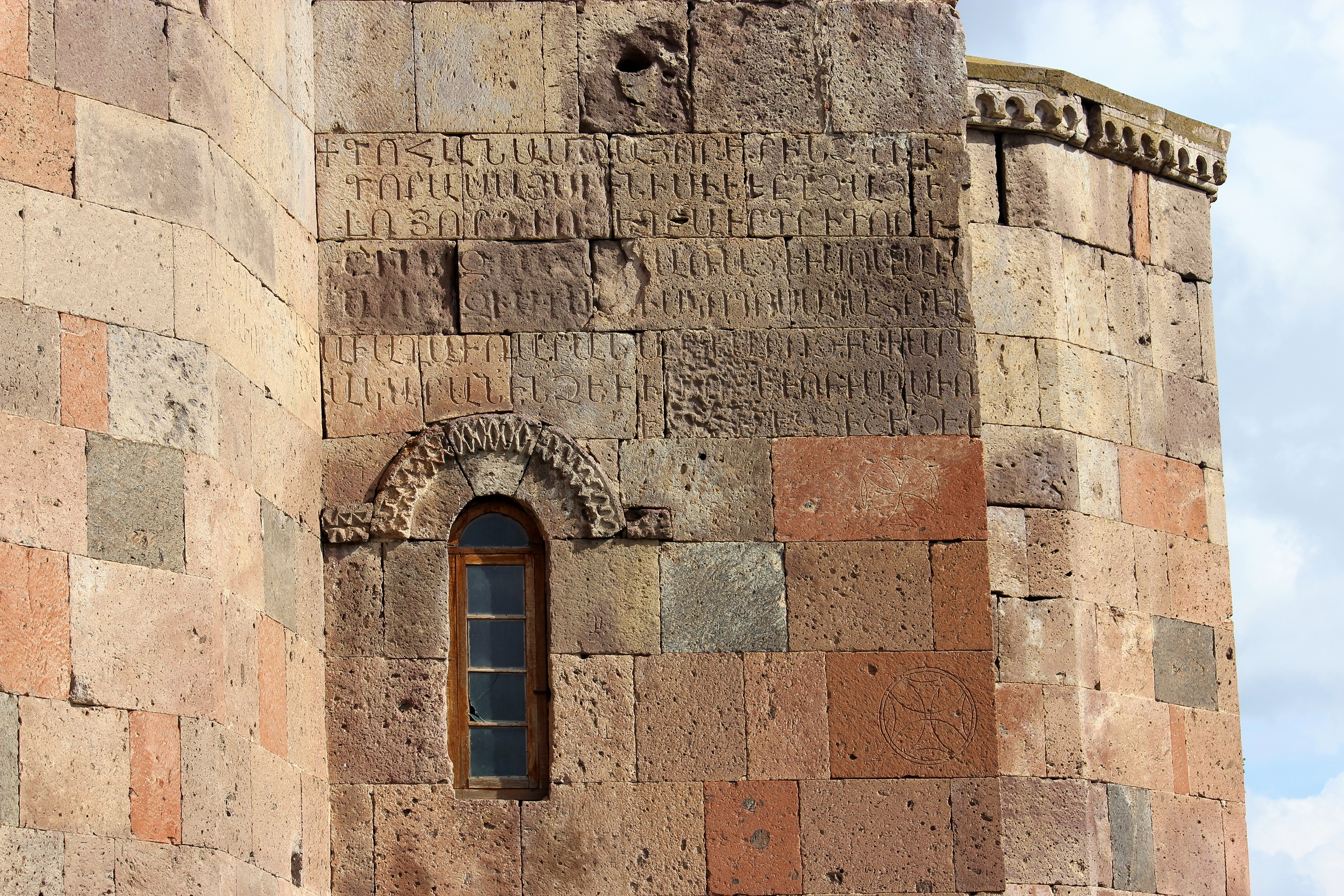
View of an inscription on the western wall.

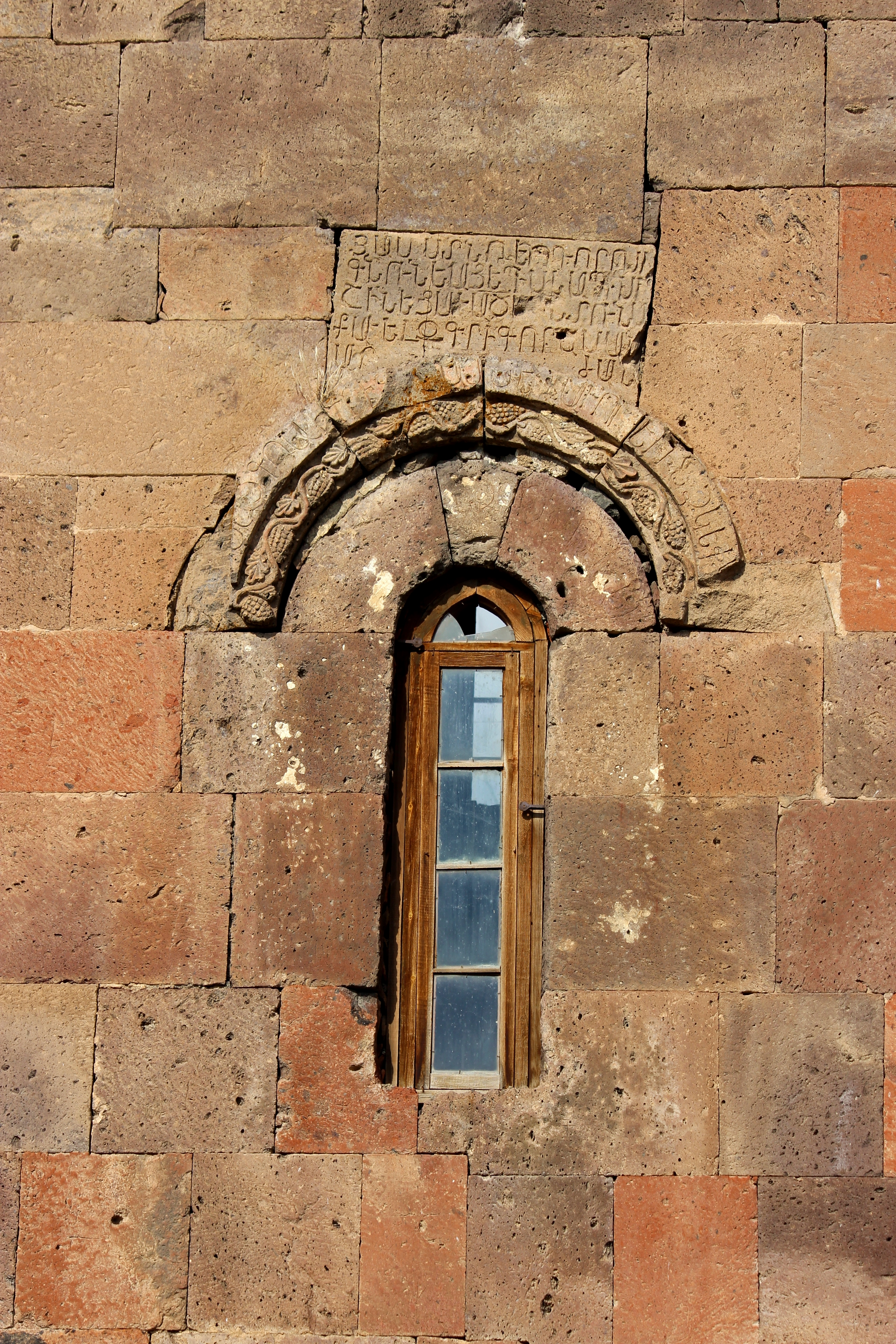
Southern window detail

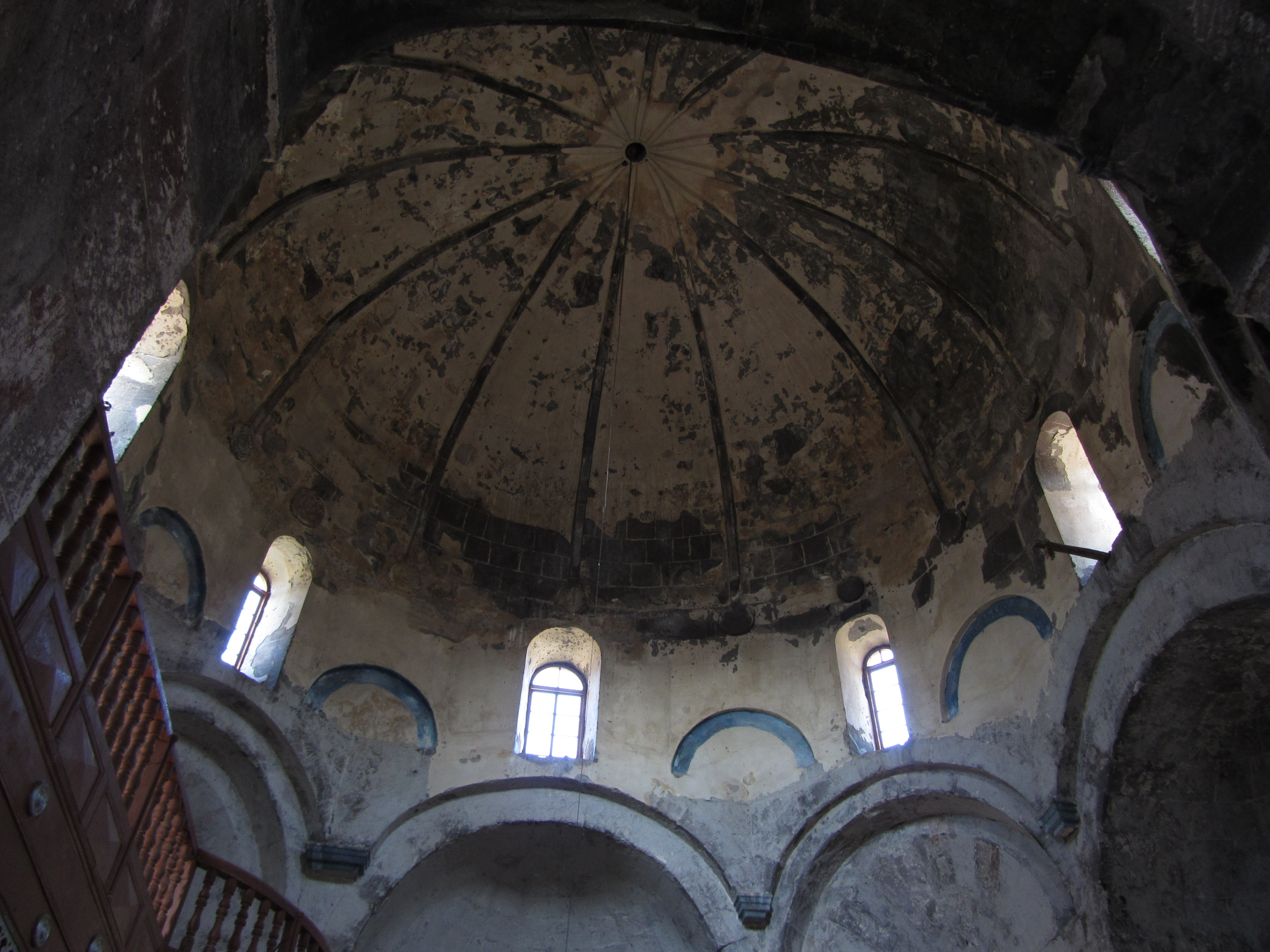
Interior view of the dome
