= Drastamat Kanayan =

Armenian revolutionary

- Դրաստամատ Կանայեան
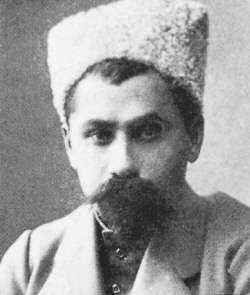

Defense Minister of Armenia
- In office 24 November 1920 – 2 December 1920
- Preceded by: Ruben Ter-Minasian
- Succeeded by: position abolished

Civil Commissioner of Van
- In office December 1917 – 7 April 1918
- Preceded by: position established
- Succeeded by: position abolished

Personal details
- Born: 31 May 1884 Igdyr (Iğdır), Surmalu uezd, Erivan Governorate, Russian Empire
- Died: 8 March 1956 (aged 71) Boston, Massachusetts, United States of America
- Party: Armenian Revolutionary Federation
- Nickname: General Dro

Military service
- Allegiance: Dashnaktsutyun; Russian Empire (1914–1917); Republic of Armenia (1918–1920)
- Years of service: 1914–1920; 1941–1945
- Commands: 2nd Battalion Volunteer Corps; Armed Forces of Yerevan; 812th Armenian Battalion
- Battles/wars: World War I; Caucasus campaign; Battle of Abaran; Battle of Mastara; Bergmann Offensive; Battle of Tutak; Alashkert Defensive Operation; Battle of Kara Killisse; Armenian–Azerbaijani war; Muslim uprisings in Kars and Sharur–Nakhichevan; Summer Campaigns; Aras War; Battle of Nakhchivan; Battle of Sharur (1919); Armeno-Georgian War; Battle of Sadakhlo; Battle of Ayrum; Battle of Alaverdi; Zangezur Skirmishes (1920); Turkish-Armenian War; Battle of Surmalu; World War II

Drastamat Kanayan (Armenian: Դրաստամատ Կանայեան; 31 May 1884 – 8 March 1956), better known as Dro (Դրո), was an Armenian military commander and politician. He was a member of the Armenian Revolutionary Federation. He briefly served as Defence Minister of the First Republic of Armenia in 1920, during the country's brief independence. During World War II, he led the Armenian Legion, which consisted of Armenian POWs who opted to fight for Nazi Germany rather than face the brutal conditions of the Nazis' camps.

== Early life ==
Drastamat Kanayan was born in Igdyr (present-day Iğdır, Turkey) in the Surmalu uezd of the Russian Empire in 1884. He was the son of Martiros Kanayan, the head of the Kanayan clan in Igdir, and his wife, Horom. At an early age, Martiros enrolled his son to the parish school of Igdir. Drastamat would skip school, preferring to visit the military barracks of Igdir because of his interest in its military exercises. Igdir at the time was an important military post where between 8,000 and 10,000 Russian troops were stationed (including infantry, Cossacks, cavalry and border guards). Most of the inhabitants of the village thrived by trading with the soldiers. Noticing that his son had no interest in books and learning, Martiros pulled him out of the village school and enrolled him to the Yerevan Gymnasium school.

Drastamat was no better in the Gymnasium school as the grades he achieved were barely enough for a promotion. Like all government schools in the provinces of Russia, there was a policy of Russification that limited education in the Armenian language to religion only. Inspired by stories of General Andranik's triumphs in the Ottoman Empire and the spread of nationalism by the Armenian Revolutionary Federation (ARF), Drastamat joined a secret youth movement in his school that opposed the tsar's government and promoted Armenian nationalism.

=== Edict on Armenian church property and Armenian-Tatar clashes ===
On 12 June 1903, the tsarist authorities passed an edict to bring all Armenian Church property under imperial control. This was faced by strong Armenian opposition because it perceived the tsarist edict as a threat to the Armenian national existence. As a result, the Armenian leadership decided to actively defend Armenian churches by dispatching militiamen who acted as guards and holding mass demonstrations. This prompted Drastamat to join the ranks of the Armenian Revolutionary Federation in order to defend churches from confiscation through public demonstrations and guard duty. In May 1905, using a bomb he carried out the assassination of the governor of Baku, Prince Mikhail Nakashidze, whom the ARF blamed for inciting Tatar attacks against Armenians in Baku. During the Armenian–Tatar clashes of 1905–1906, Dro participated in the organization of Armenian defense militias in the regions of Kotayk, Nakhijevan, and Zangezur. In 1907, Dro assassinated Tsarist general Maksud Alikhanov-Avarsky in Alexandropol. Prior to the Russian Revolution, Dro had killed more than one Russian official.

== World War I ==
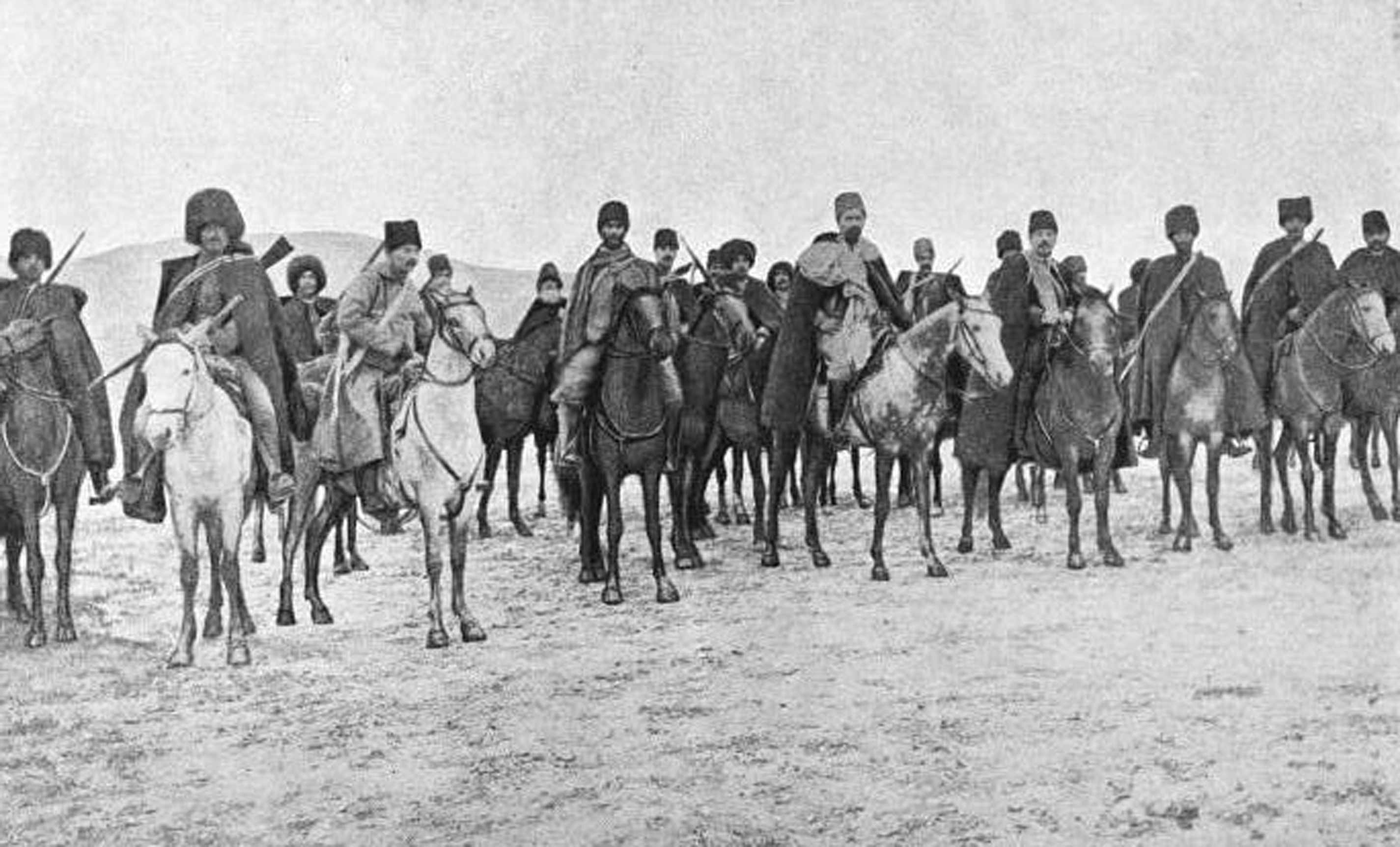
Staff of Armenian volunteers; Khetcho, Drastamat Kanayan, and Karekin Pastermadjian, 1914

He served as detachment commander in the Russian Caucasus Army during World War I. He was one of the commanders of the Armenian volunteer units and was decorated by the Tsar.

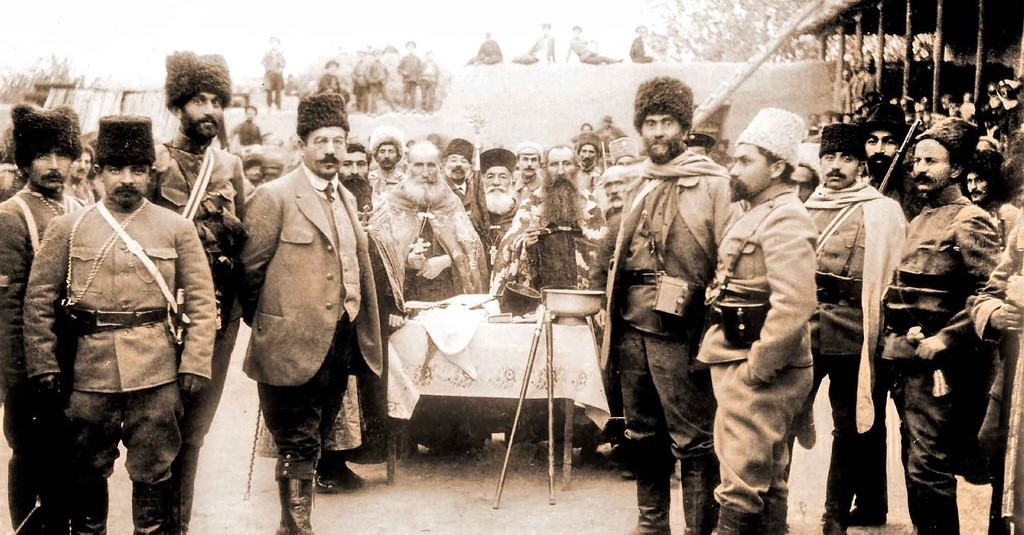
General Dro, third from the right, leading the second battalion in 1915

In November 1914, he commanded the second battalion of the Armenian volunteers. The second battalion of the Armenian volunteers engaged in battle for the first time near Bayazid during the Bergmann Offensive. In the course of a bloody combat which lasted twenty-four hours, Dro, commander of the battalion, was seriously wounded. From that day to March of the following year, he remained in critical condition, but his battalion participated in eleven battles near Alashkert and Tutak, until Dro recovered and returned to resume the command. Kanayan had already become a popular military leader after the victories over the Ottoman Empire at the Caucasus Campaign.

Between March 1918 and April 1918 he was appointed by the Armenian National Council military commissar to the occupation of Turkish Armenia of the Ararat region. He was the commander of the Armenian forces in the Battle of Bash Abaran. The Armenian victories at Bash Abaran, Karakilisa, and Sardarabad stopped the advance of the Ottoman Army and are credited with preventing the destruction of the Armenian nation and allowing the creation of the First Republic of Armenia.

== First Republic of Armenia ==
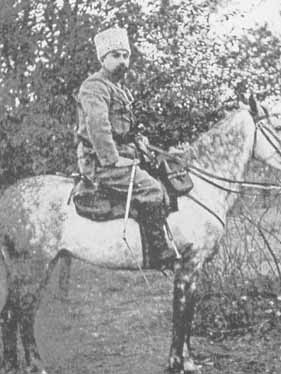
Kanayan on horseback

Dro was one of the chief military commanders of the First Republic of Armenia. He commanded Armenian forces during the brief Armeno-Georgian War in December 1918 over the disputed Borchaly (Lori) and Akhalkalaki uezds ("counties").

=== Armenian–Azerbaijani War ===
During much of 1919, Dro and his army fought Ottoman-backed insurrections by Muslims against the First Republic of Armenia, defending the area south of Yerevan in what is now Ararat Province of Armenia. In December 1919, Dro went to Goris with a force of 600 soldiers with the intention of establishing Armenian control over the Syunik and Nagorno-Karabakh regions, which were fiercely disputed between Armenia and Azerbaijan. In a short amount of time, Dro, along with Garegin Nzhdeh and other commanders, drove out the Azerbaijani army and expelled most of the Turkic-speaking Muslims from Syunik, solidifying Armenian control over the region.

On the night from 21 to 22 March 1920, when the Azerbaijanis were celebrating Novruz Bayram, the Armenians of Artsakh revolted and organized a surprise attack. During these clashes thousands of people from both the Armenian and Azerbaijani sides were killed, with more than 7,000 houses burned and Shushi virtually cleansed of its Armenian population. Dro, who had not expected the Armenian uprising, arrived in Artsakh only in April, when many Armenian villages had already been destroyed by the Azerbaijani army.

On 27 April 1920, the Red Army invaded Azerbaijan and established a Soviet government there. The leadership of the Red Army demanded that Dro and his army leave Artsakh and Syunik. Dro knew that if he did not comply with this demand the Red Army and the armed forces of Azerbaijan would act jointly against Armenia and the Armenians of Artsakh. Dro withdrew from Artsakh after he was given assurances by the emissaries of Bolshevik leader Sergo Ordzhonikidze regarding a just solution to the Artsakh conflict. On 26 May 1920, the 10th Congress of the Armenian National Council of Karabakh, which took place in Taghavard village, proclaimed the establishment of Soviet power in Artsakh. The Armenian National Council of Artsakh was replaced with the Revolutionary Committee of Nagorno-Artsakh, headed by Sargis Hambardzumyan. That same day, Kanayan left Artsakh with his units and withdrew to Syunik.

In the July 1920, Dro and Minister of Defence Ruben Ter Minasian led a campaign against Ottoman-backed Muslim rebels supported by Azerbaijan in the Vedibasar and Zangibasar districts (around modern-day Vedi and Masis, respectively), resettling Armenian refugees in the abandoned Muslim villages.

In August 1920, Dro's forces engaged in skirmishes with the Red Army, which made attempts to advance into Syunik. Despite some initial success, Dro was forced to leave Goris to the Red Army and withdraw to Daralayaz (modern-day Vayots Dzor).

=== Turkish–Armenian War and Sovietization of Armenia ===
On 24 September 1920, Kâzım Karabekir's army invaded Armenia. Dro commanded the defence of his native district Surmalu. Although Dro successfully defended Surmalu, the fall of Kars and the further advance of Karabekir's army forced Dro's army to retreat to the other side of the Arax River into modern-day Armenia on November 12.

From 24 November to 2 December 1920, Kanayan was the Defence Minister of Armenia. On 30 November 1920, Soviet Russia issued an ultimatum to the leadership of Armenia to peacefully hand over power to a Soviet government. Dro was authorized to negotiate with Soviet representative Boris Legran about the conditions of the transfer of power. Dro ordered the Armenian army not to show resistance against the Red Army if it advanced into Armenia. He was one of the signatories of the declaration of the transfer of power to a Soviet government made by the government of Armenia on 2 December 1920, which also declared Dro de facto leader of Armenia pending the arrival of the Revolutionary Committee of Armenia to Yerevan.

Dro remained in the country and remained commander of Soviet Armenia's army until January 1921, when he was exiled to Russia along with 1,200 Armenian officers. He stayed in Moscow until 1923, and traveled in Europe before finally settling in Bucharest, Romania in 1925. Dro's second wife, Arpenik (whom he married in 1915), and their two children were sent into internal exile in Siberia and remained separated from him for the rest of his life.

== World War II ==
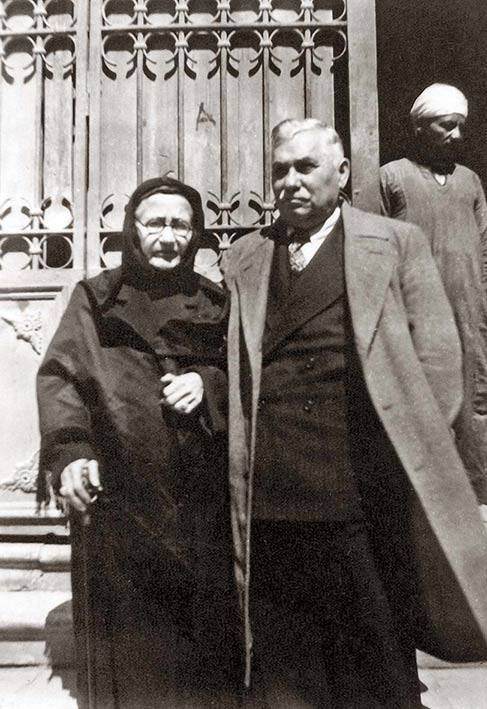
Sose Mayrig with Drastamat Kanayan in Egypt, 1947.

During World War II, Dro was one of several members of the ARF who, without approval from the party leadership, entered negotiations with Nazi Germany with the hope of freeing Armenia of Soviet control in the event of Germany's victory over the Soviet Union. The Armenian Legion was formed from Armenian POWs in the Nazi POW camps who opted to fight for Germany rather than face the brutal conditions of the camps. The Legion was placed under Dro's command. The Legion was trained by Wehrmacht officers and participated in the occupation of the Crimean Peninsula and the Caucasus.

With the end of World War II, Drastamat Kanayan was arrested by American forces in Heidelberg, but soon released. After World War II, Kanayan emigrated to the United States and continued his political activities. In 1947, at the World Congress of the ARF, he was forgiven for his collaboration with Nazis and was again elected a member of the party.

== Death, burial, and legacy ==
Dro settled with the large Armenian community in Beirut, where he lived for several years with the former prime minister of the First Republic of Armenia, Simon Vratsian. He returned to the United States several times for medical treatment. Dro died in Boston, Massachusetts while there for medical treatment on 8 March 1956 and was buried there. He was survived by his third wife Gayane (whom he married in Bucharest in 1935), their son Mardiros (Martin) and Dro's stepdaughter Olga. His remains were taken to Armenia for final burial in Aparan, on 28 May 2000, coinciding with the commemoration of the 82nd anniversary of the First Republic of Armenia.

In 2001, the Ministry of Defence of Armenia established the Drastamat Kanayan medal, which is awarded to military personnel and civilians who excel in military instruction. In 2005, the government of Armenia founded the Drastamat Kanayan Institute for National Strategic Studies, which in 2016 became a part of the National Institute of Strategic Studies under the Ministry of Defence. A street in the Kanaker-Zeytun District of Yerevan is named after Dro.

== Gallery ==
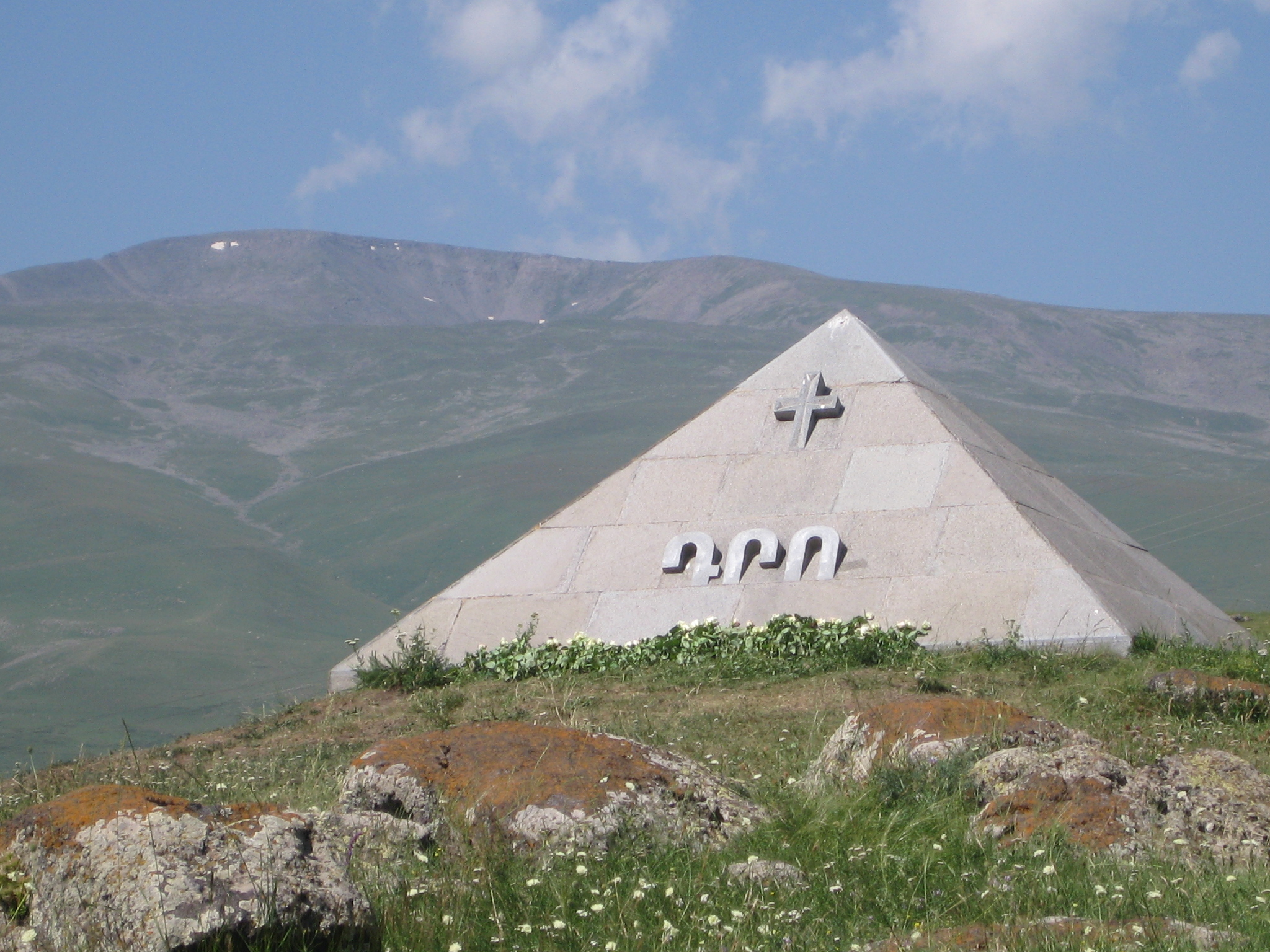
Dro's mausoleum in Aparan, Armenia

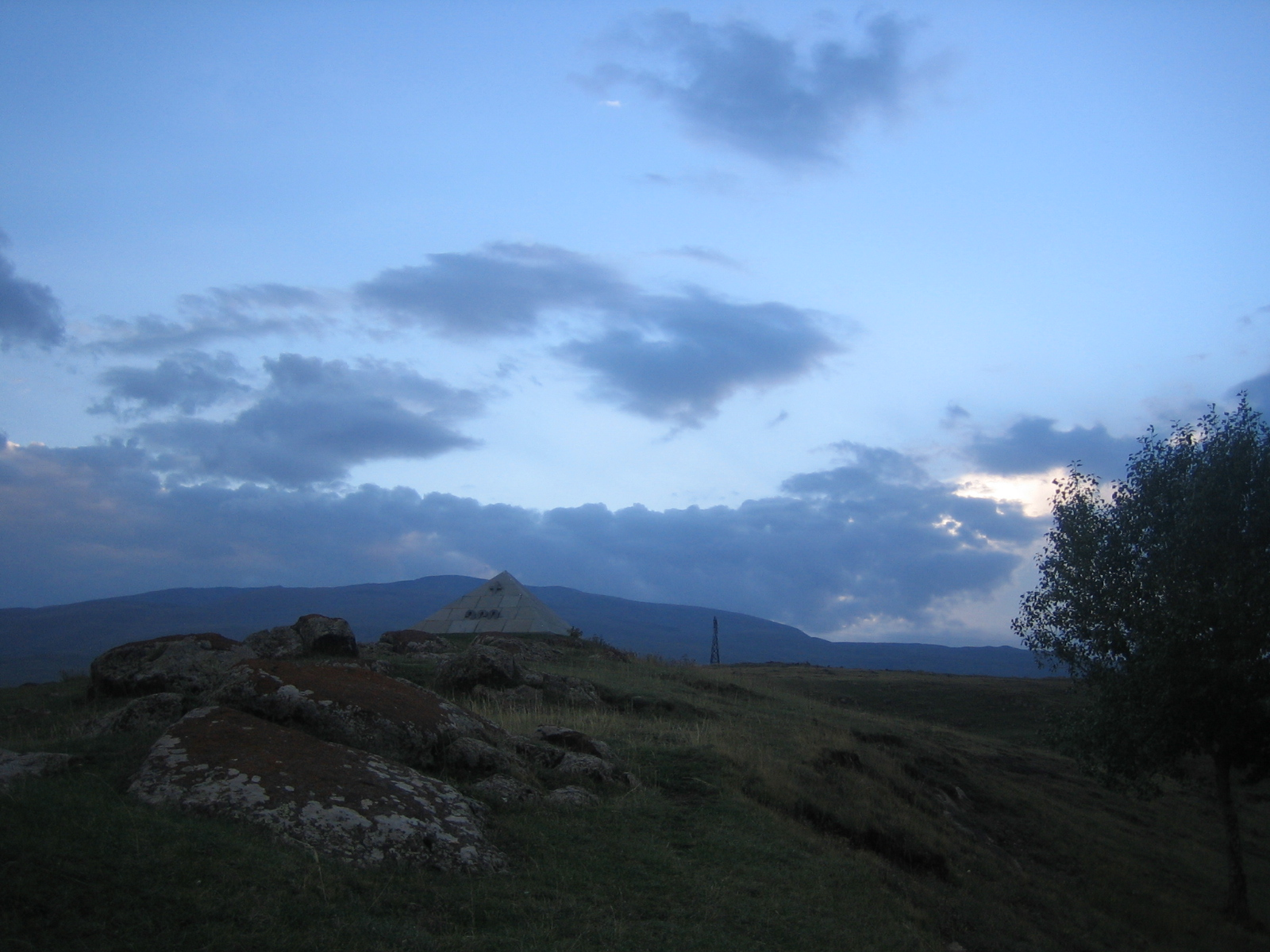
Dro's mausoleum at night

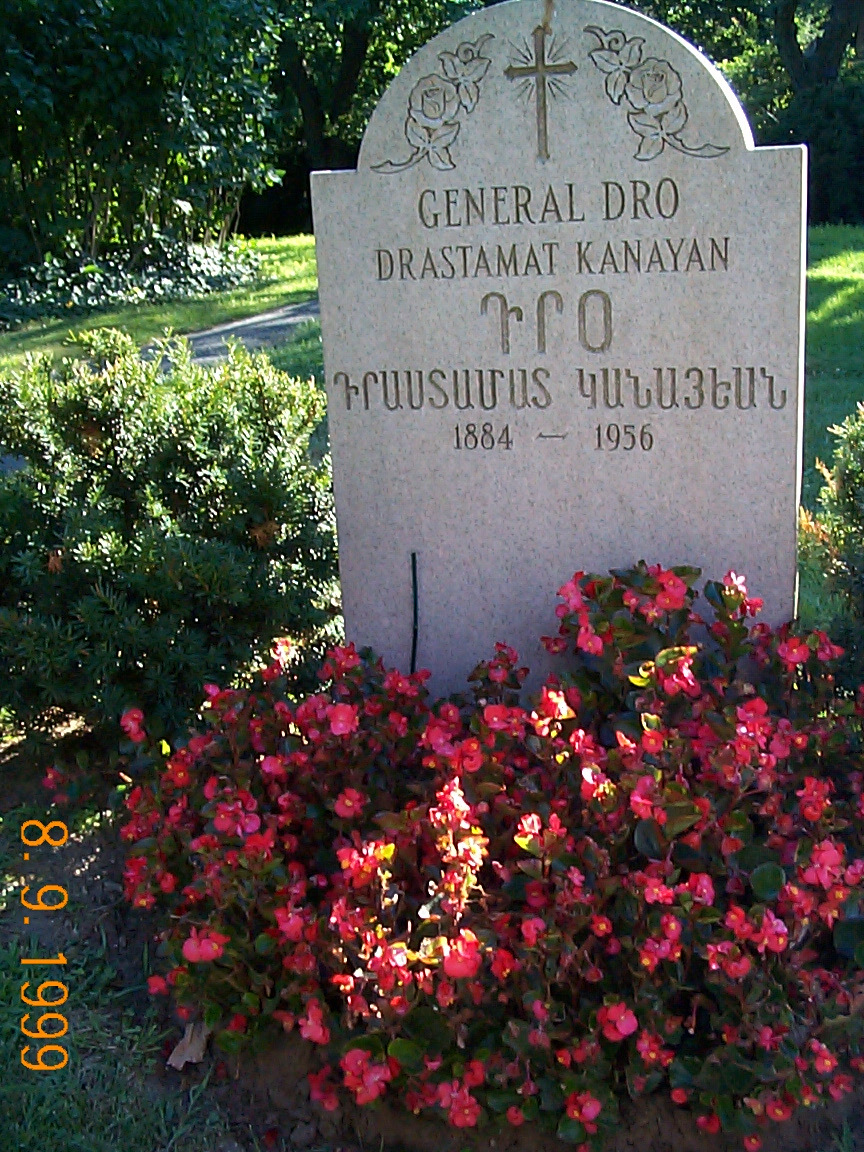
Dro's grave in Mount Auburn Cemetery, Watertown, Massachusetts (pre-reinterment in Armenia)

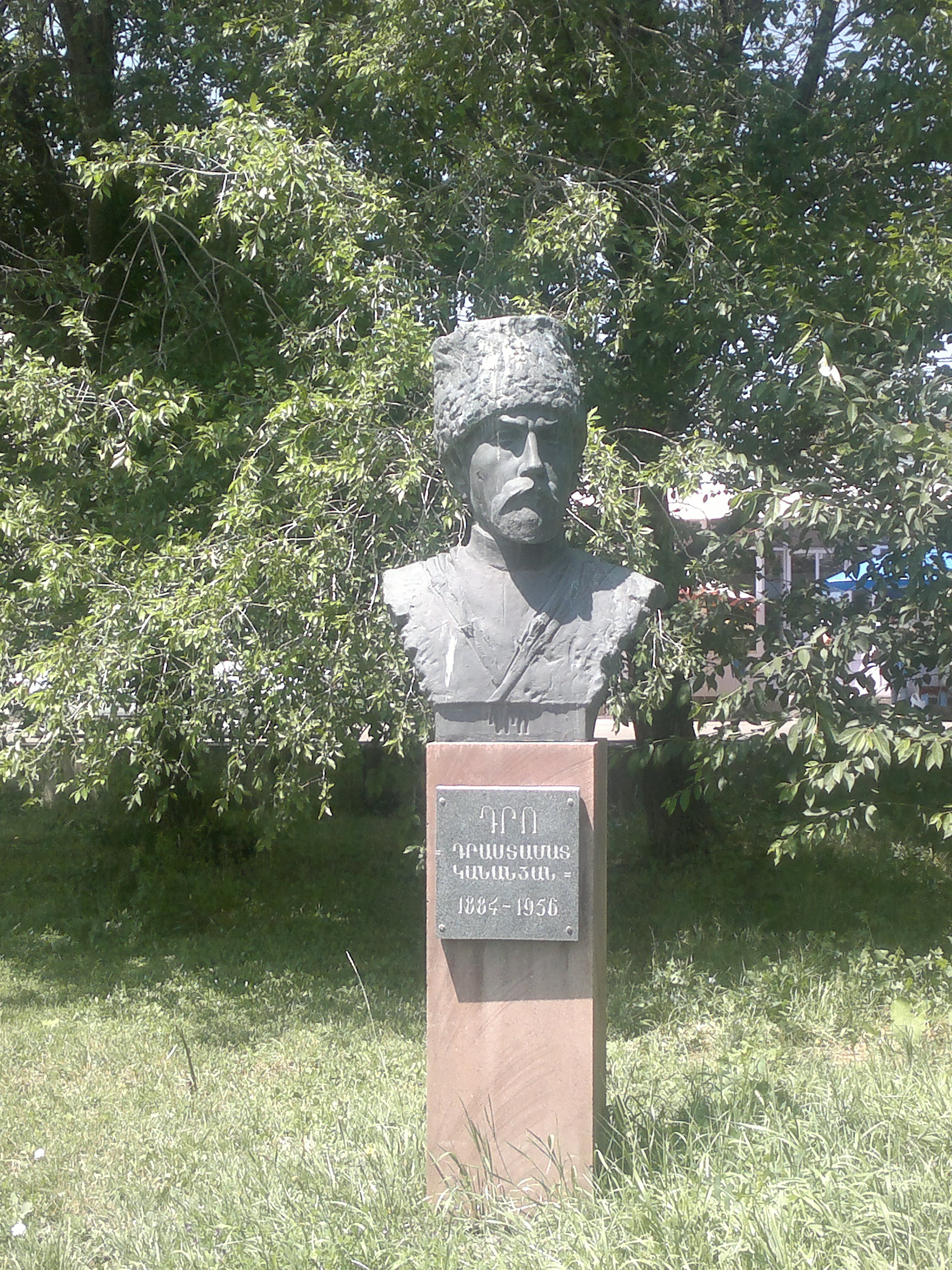
Dro's bust in Gyumri
