= Mastara =

Mastara Մաստարա
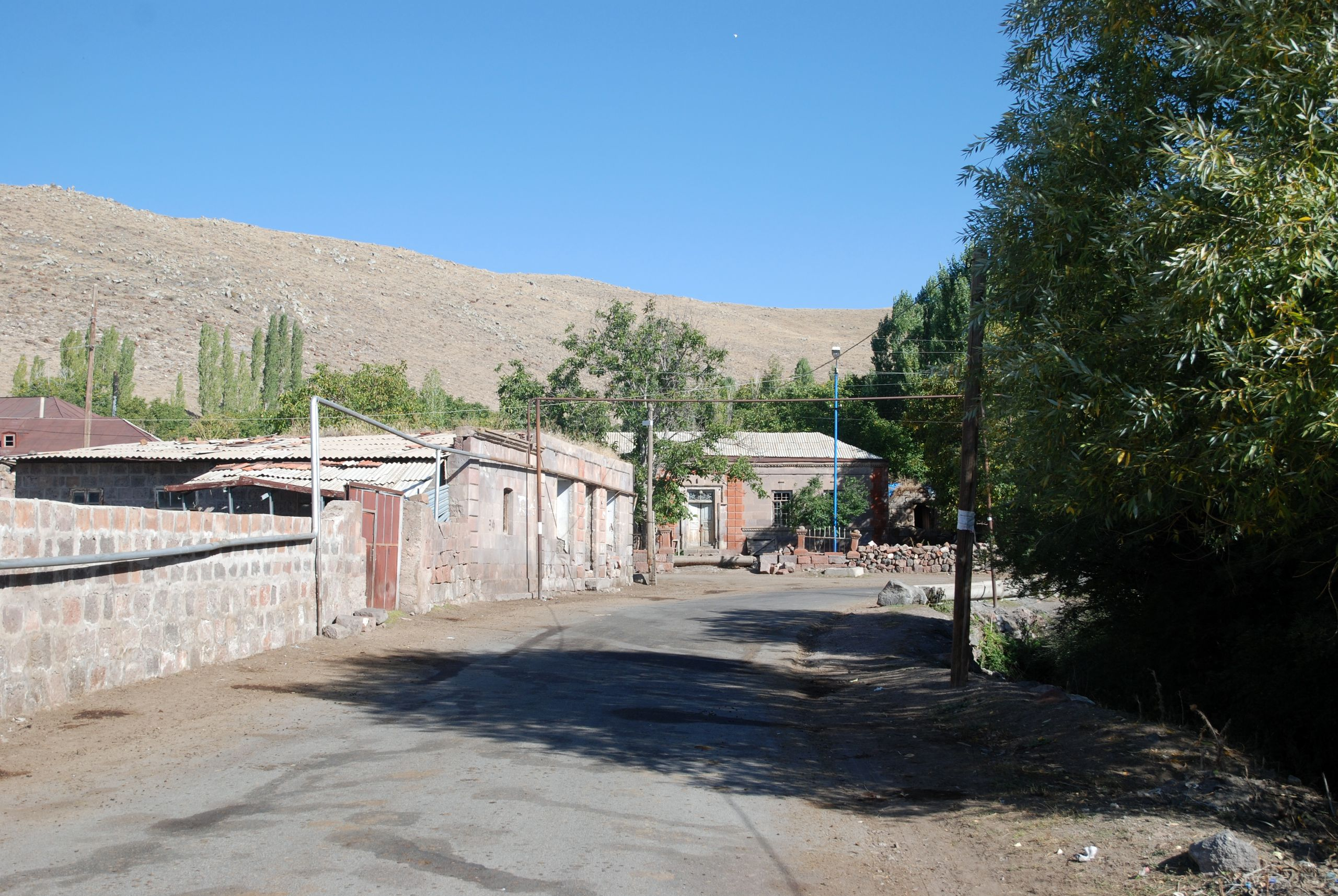
- Street in the village of Mastara.

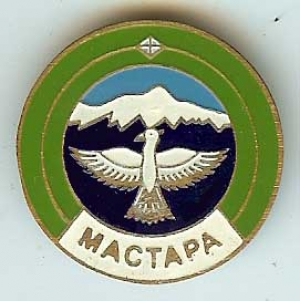
- Coat of arms

- Location within Armenia Location within Aragatsotn
- Coordinates: 40°26′53″N 43°52′54″E
- Country: Armenia
- Province: Aragatsotn
- Municipality: Talin

Area
  - Total: 2.42 km^{2} (0.93 sq mi)
- Elevation: 1,745 m (5,725 ft)

Population (2011)
  - Total: 2,433
  - Density: 1,010/km^{2} (2,600/sq mi)
- Time zone: UTC+4 (GMT+4)
  - Summer (DST): UTC+5
- Postal code: 0511

Mastara (Armenian: Մաստարա) is a village in the Talin Municipality of the Aragatsotn Province of Armenia. The 5th-century Armenian Church of S. Hovhannes is situated in the northeastern half of the village, while the church of S. Stepanos Nakhava sits on a hilltop to the north. There is also the small medieval Tukh Manuk Church in the village to the southeast.

== Etymology ==
The name Mastara is thought to be derived from the words mas, meaning "a piece", and tara, "I buried/took". This comes from the popular legend that Gregory the Illuminator brought back relics of John the Baptist from Caesaria, a fragment of which he enshrined beneath the Church of S. Hovhannes.

== Gallery ==
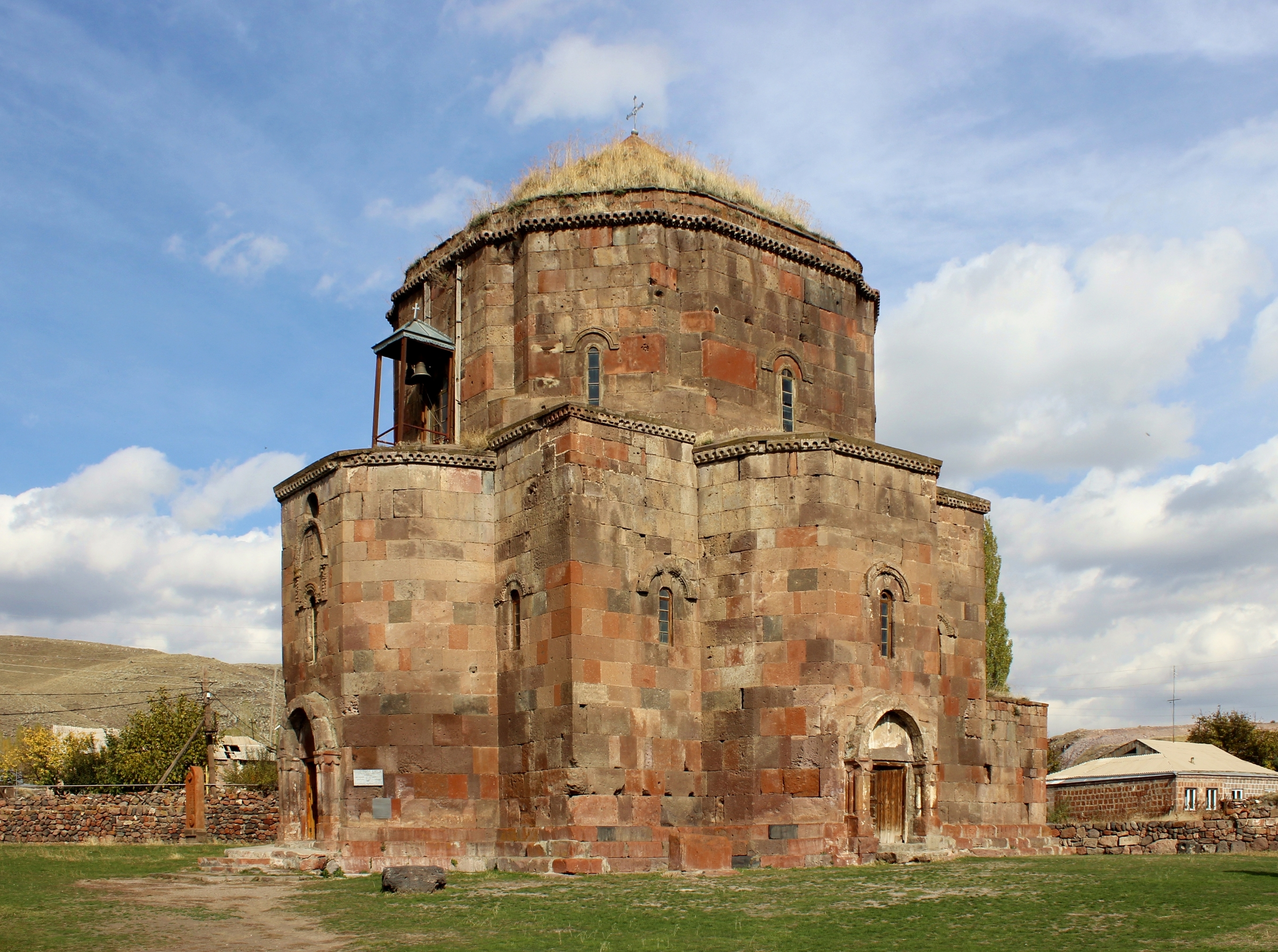
S. Hovhannes Church

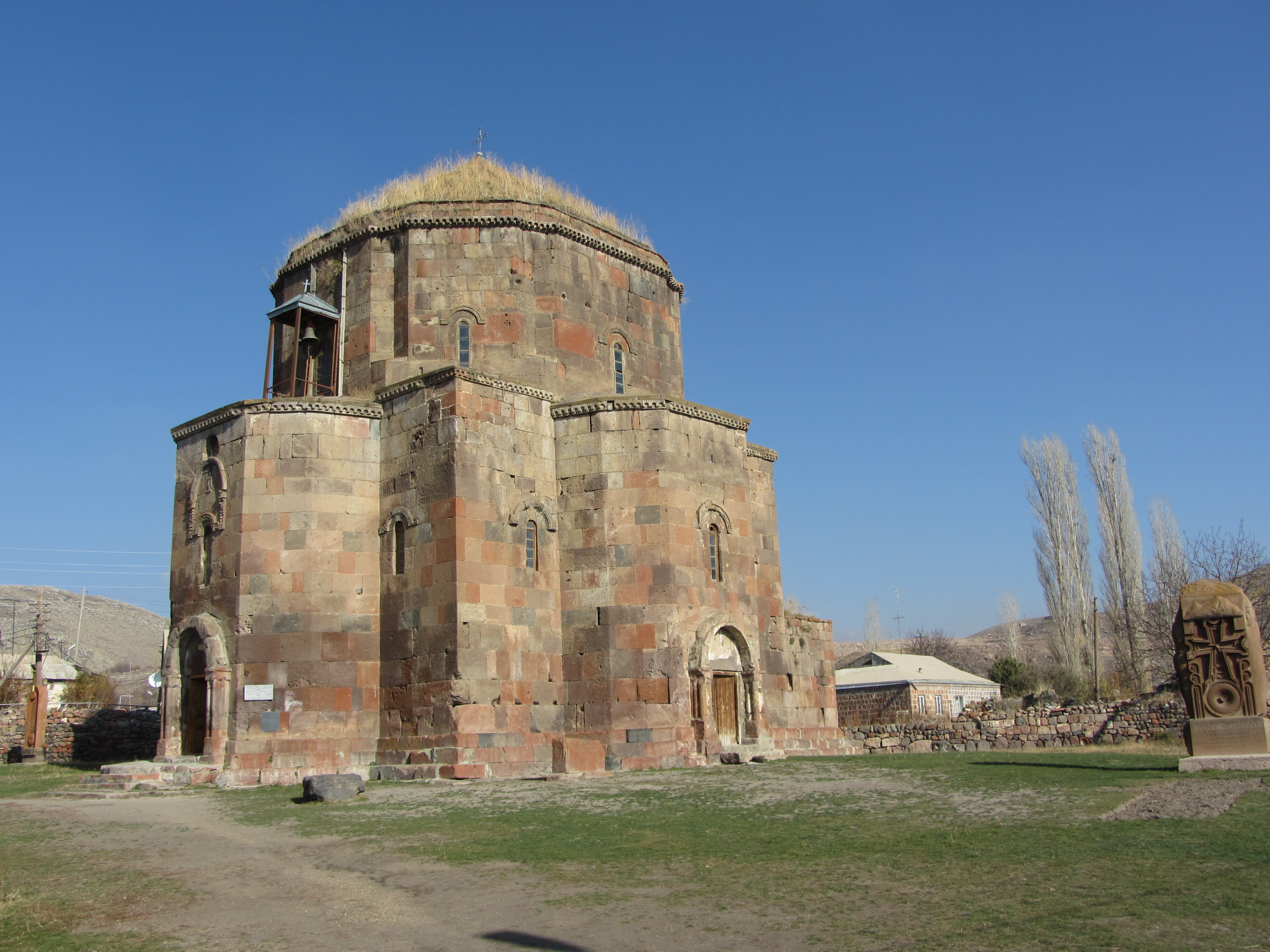
S. Hovhannes Church

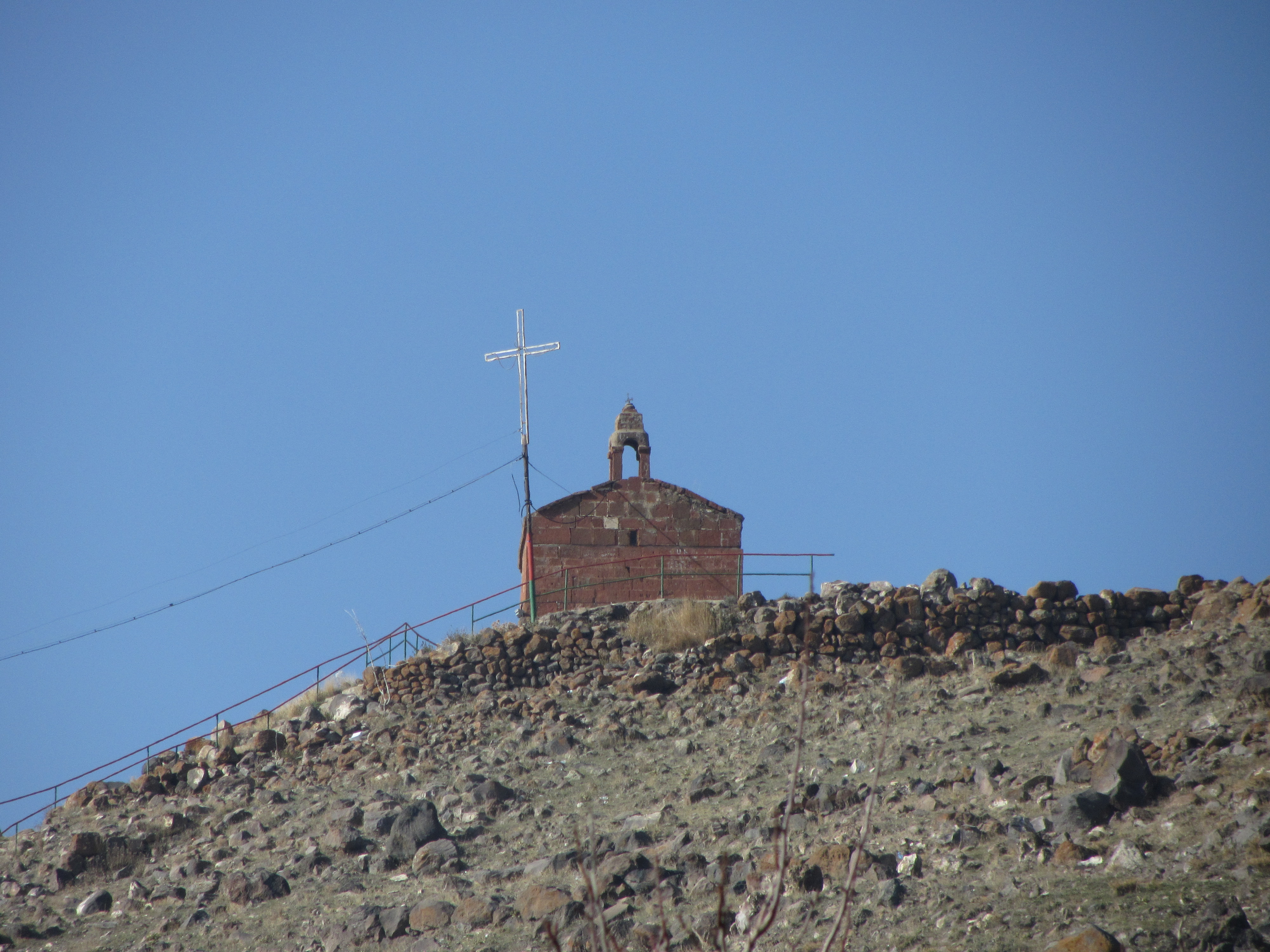
S. Stepanos Nakhavka Church

== See also ==
- Battle of Mastara
