= Battle of Mastara =

- Part of Caucasus campaign of World War I
Date	24–28 May 1918
Location	Mastara, Armenia
Result	Armenian victory

Belligerents
Armenian National Council	Ottoman Empire

Commanders and leaders
Drastamat Kanayan	Wehib Pasha

Strength
3,000	8,000

Casualties and losses
500	2,000

The Battle of Mastara was a military battle fought by the Armenian National Council and the Ottoman Empire between 24 and 28 May 1918, and was one of the battles that resulted in the formation of the First Republic of Armenia.

== Battle ==
The battle began on 24 May 1918, when Ottoman troops approached the Armenian garrison of only 3,000 men commanded by Drastamat Kanayan in Mastara, the Ottoman army had much more weapons and soldiers, however they were not as moralized as the Armenians were.

The Ottomans had begun their assault, and by 25 May heavy fighting was occurring in Mastara, the Ottomans were however unable to properly break the defensive line of the Armenians, whom used the Church of Saint John to command the defensive line. After two failed Ottoman attacks from 24–25 May 1918, they decided to assault the Church of Saint John directly, due to its importance for the Armenian troops both culturally and for the sake of the battle's command, the Ottoman attack began on the night of 26 May 26 1918, with Ottoman troops seeing initial successes, breaking through the Armenian defensive line for the first time and rapidly advancing towards the church. The Armenians did not easily give up, as they fought bravely, using grenades and hit and run tactics against the Ottomans in the fairly fortified city, suffering hundreds of casualties in the process but being successful in the defense, as Ottoman troops were forced to retreat outside of the city, back to their original positions. Following this failed attack by the Ottomans, their morale continued to deplete, with Ottoman troops regularly deserting during the battle which forced the Ottomans to retreat after more breakthrough attempts between 27 and 28 May had horribly failed.
