= Georgian military ranks =

The Georgian military ranks are the ranks and insignia currently in use by the Defense Forces of Georgia.

In the early 1990s, the Defence Forces of Georgia used a transitional system of ranks and insignia, which was based on the Soviet system, but with Georgian 7-petal stars instead of the Soviet 5-petal.

== Current ranks ==
=== Commissioned officer ranks ===
The rank insignia of commissioned officers.

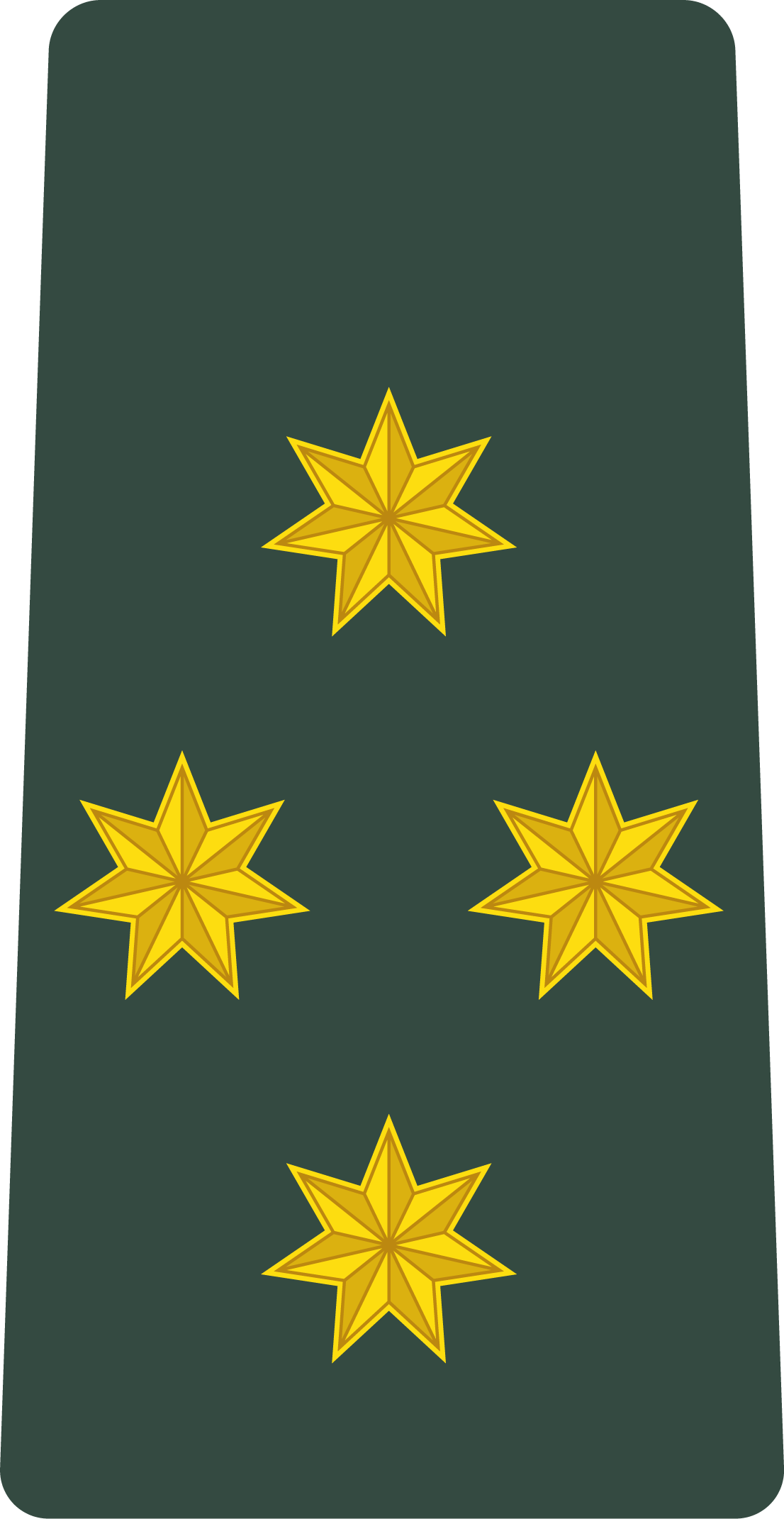
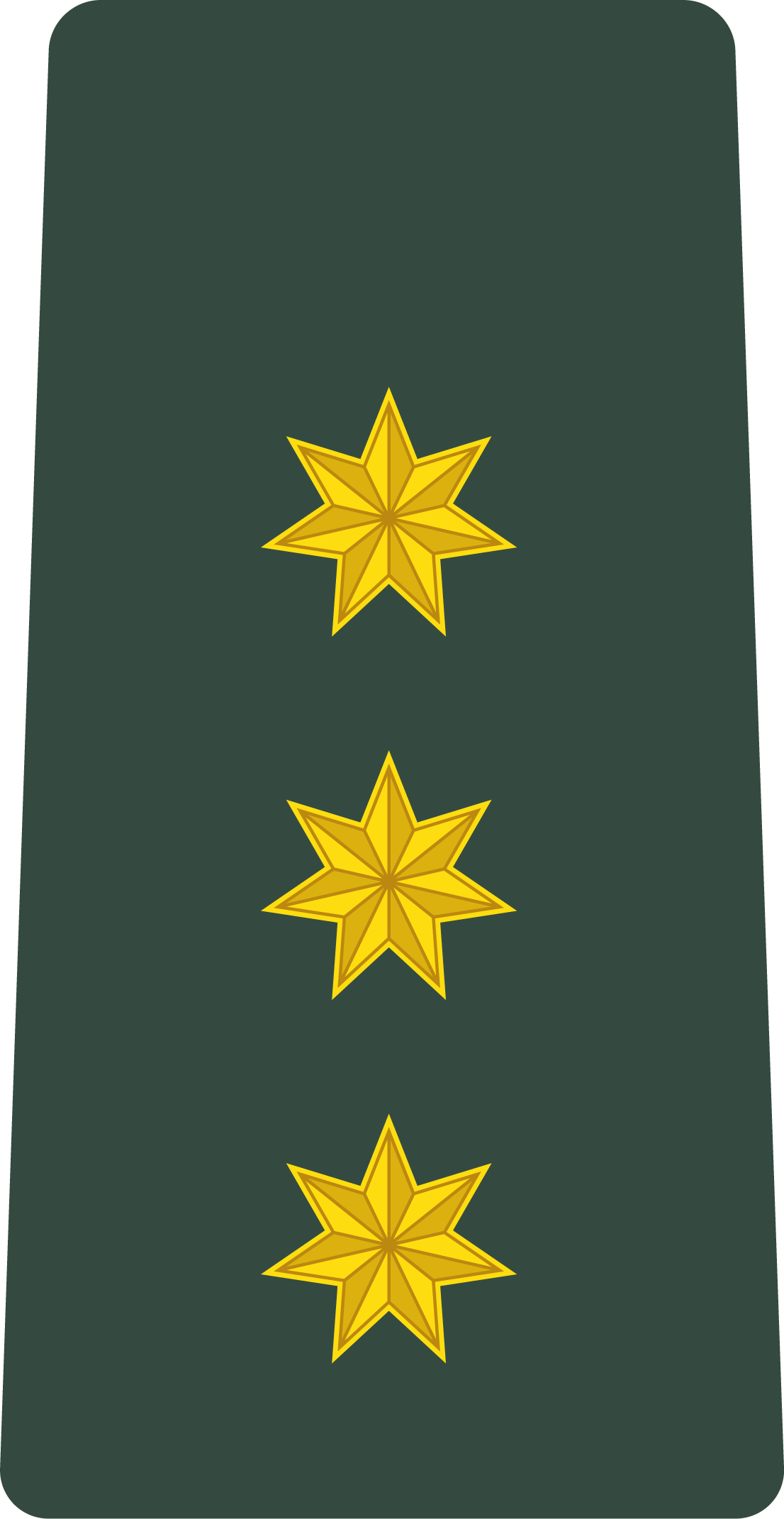
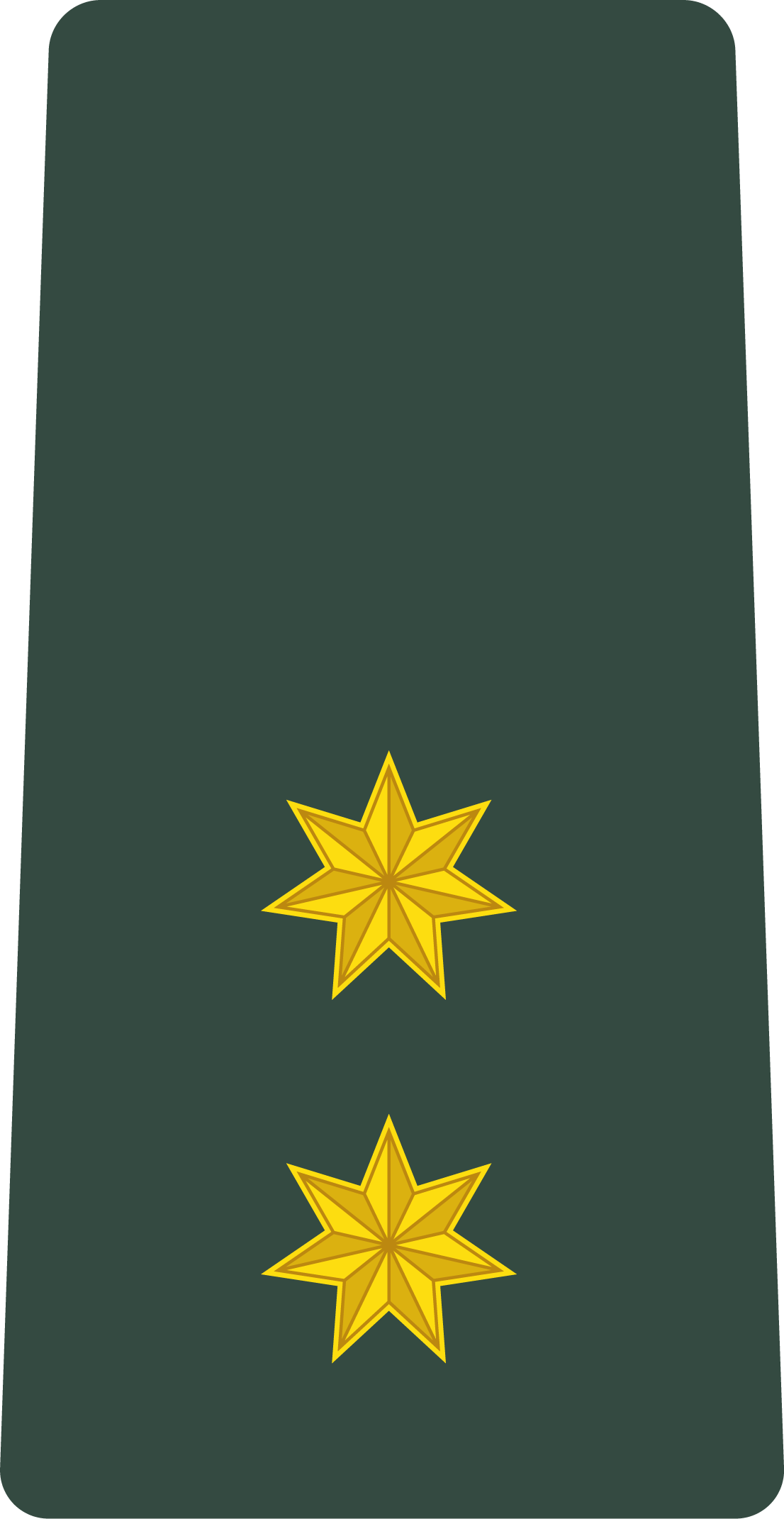
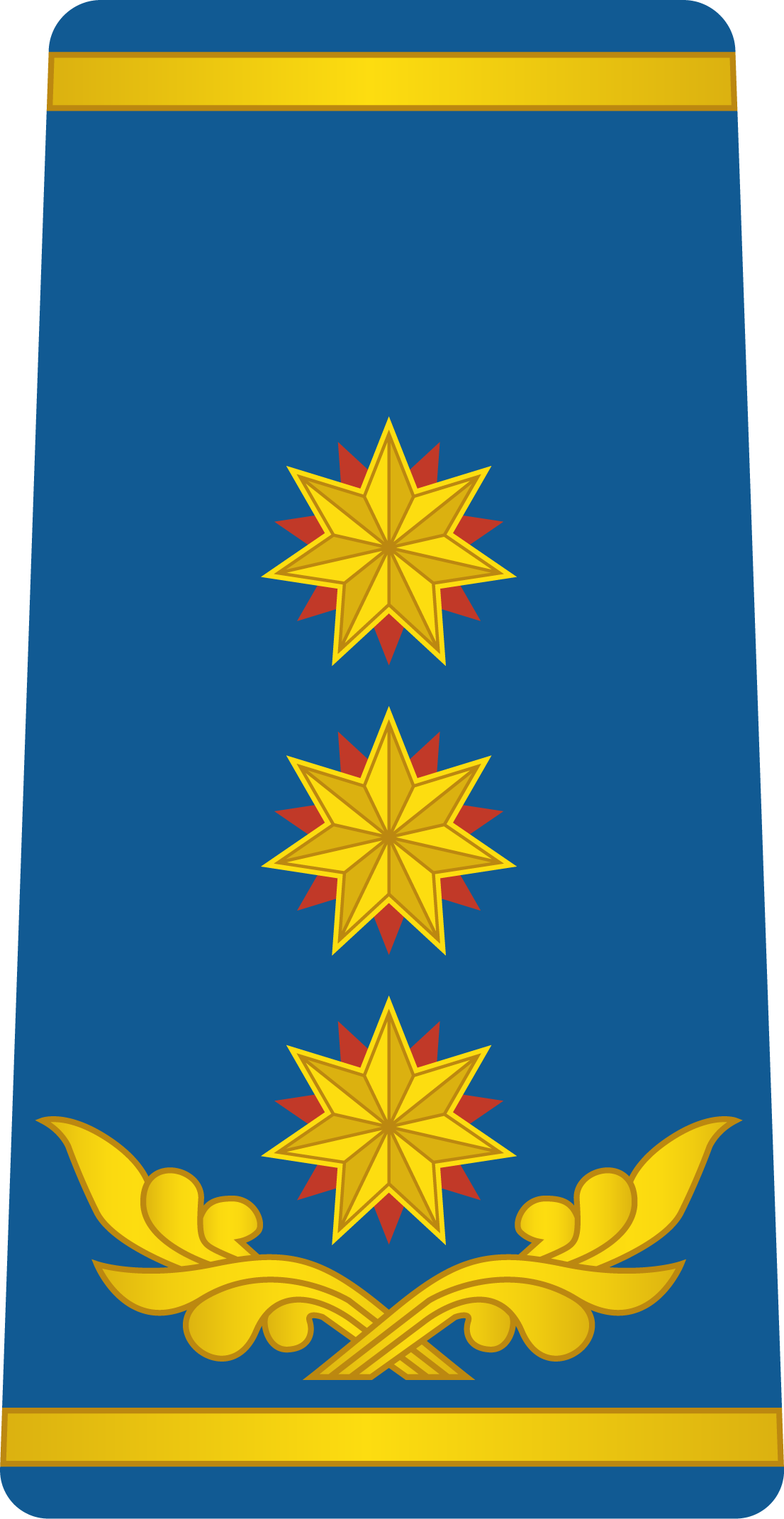
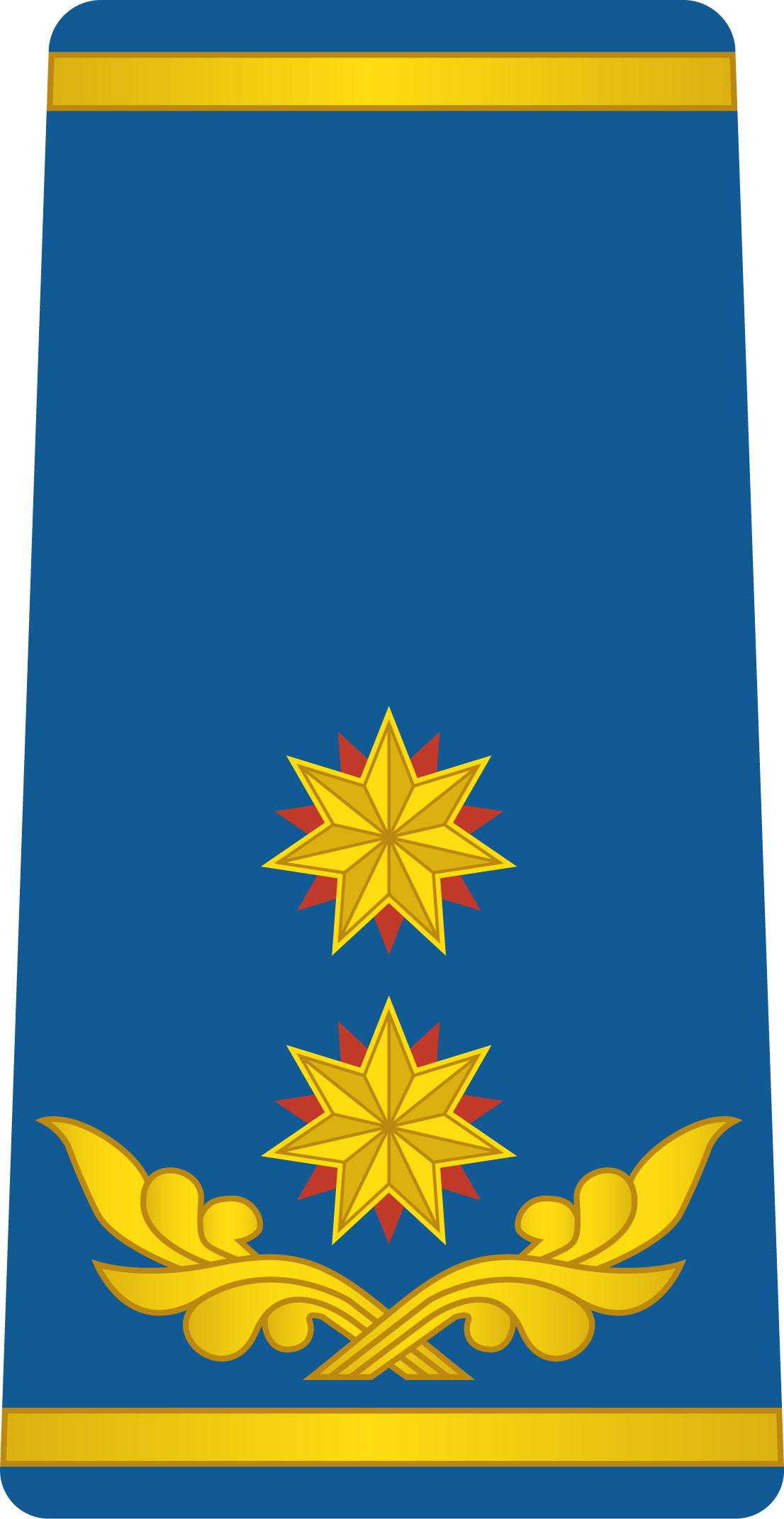
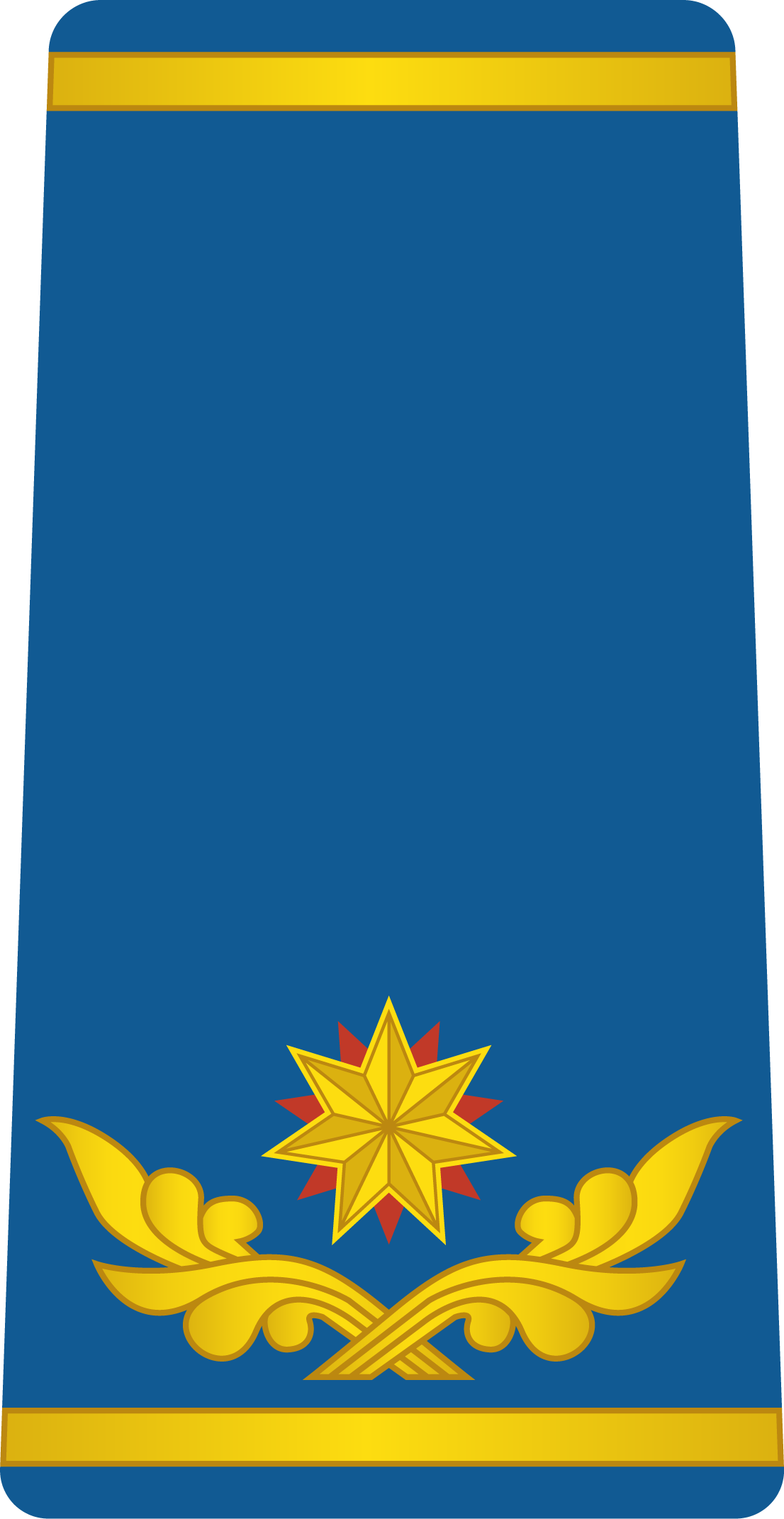
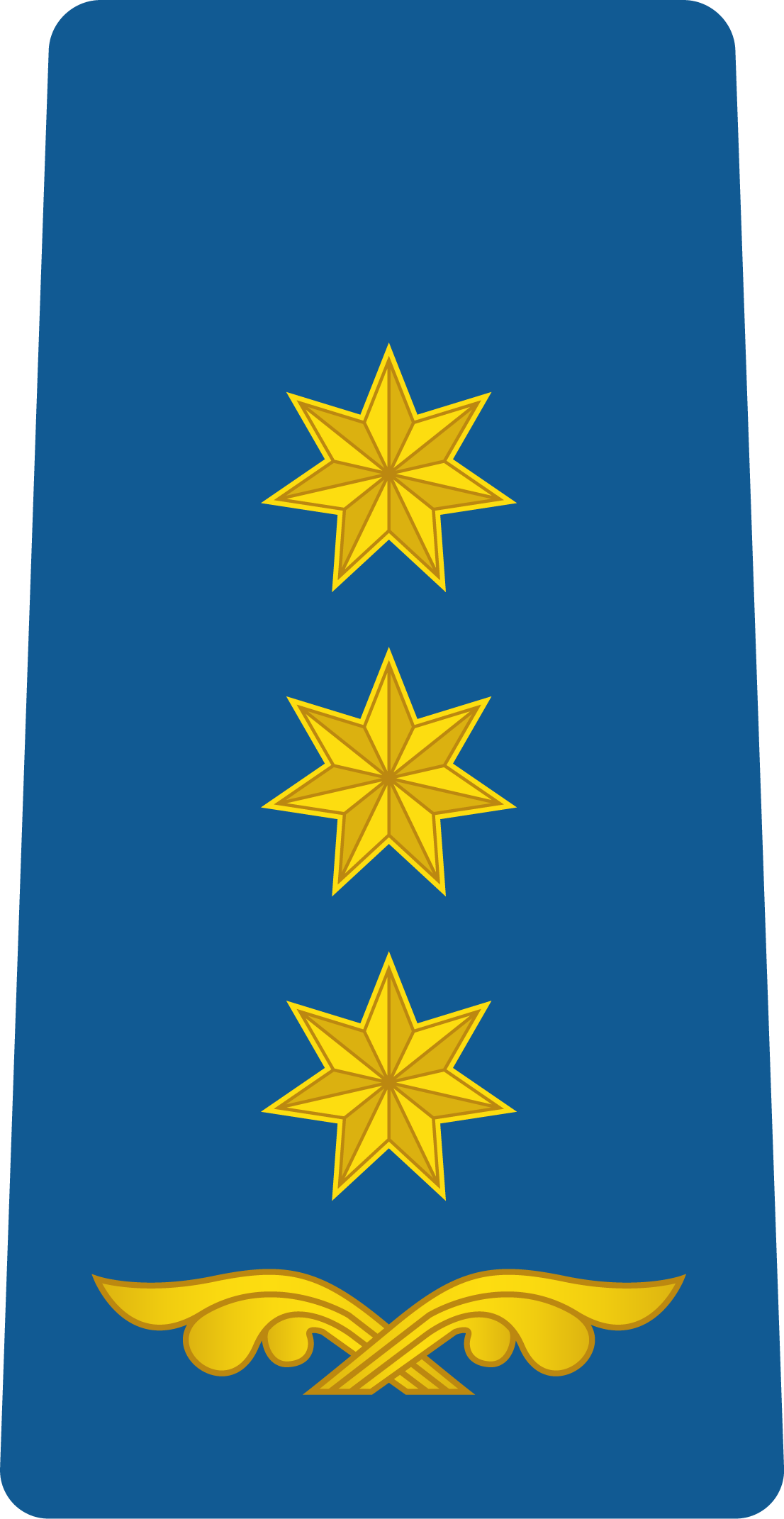
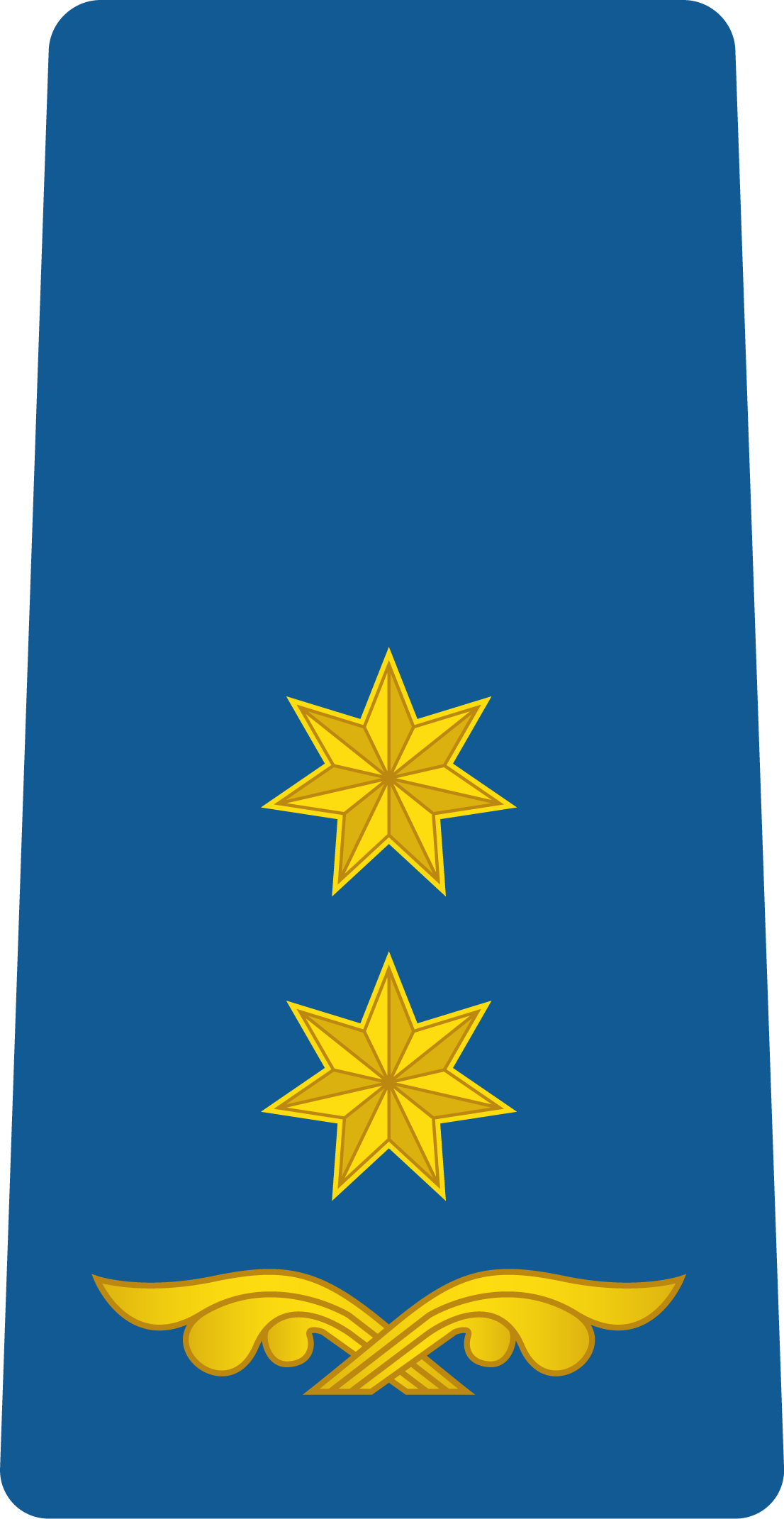
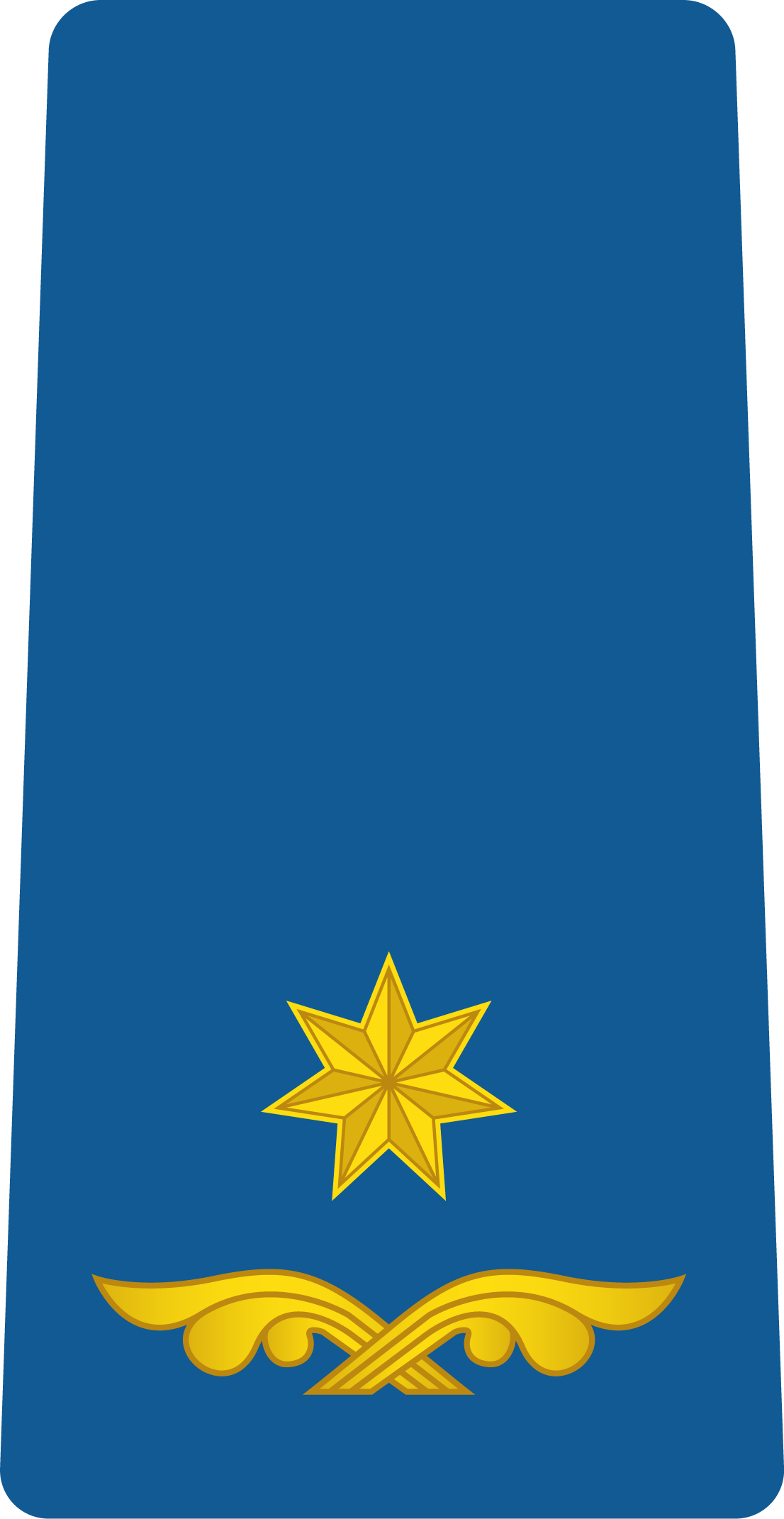
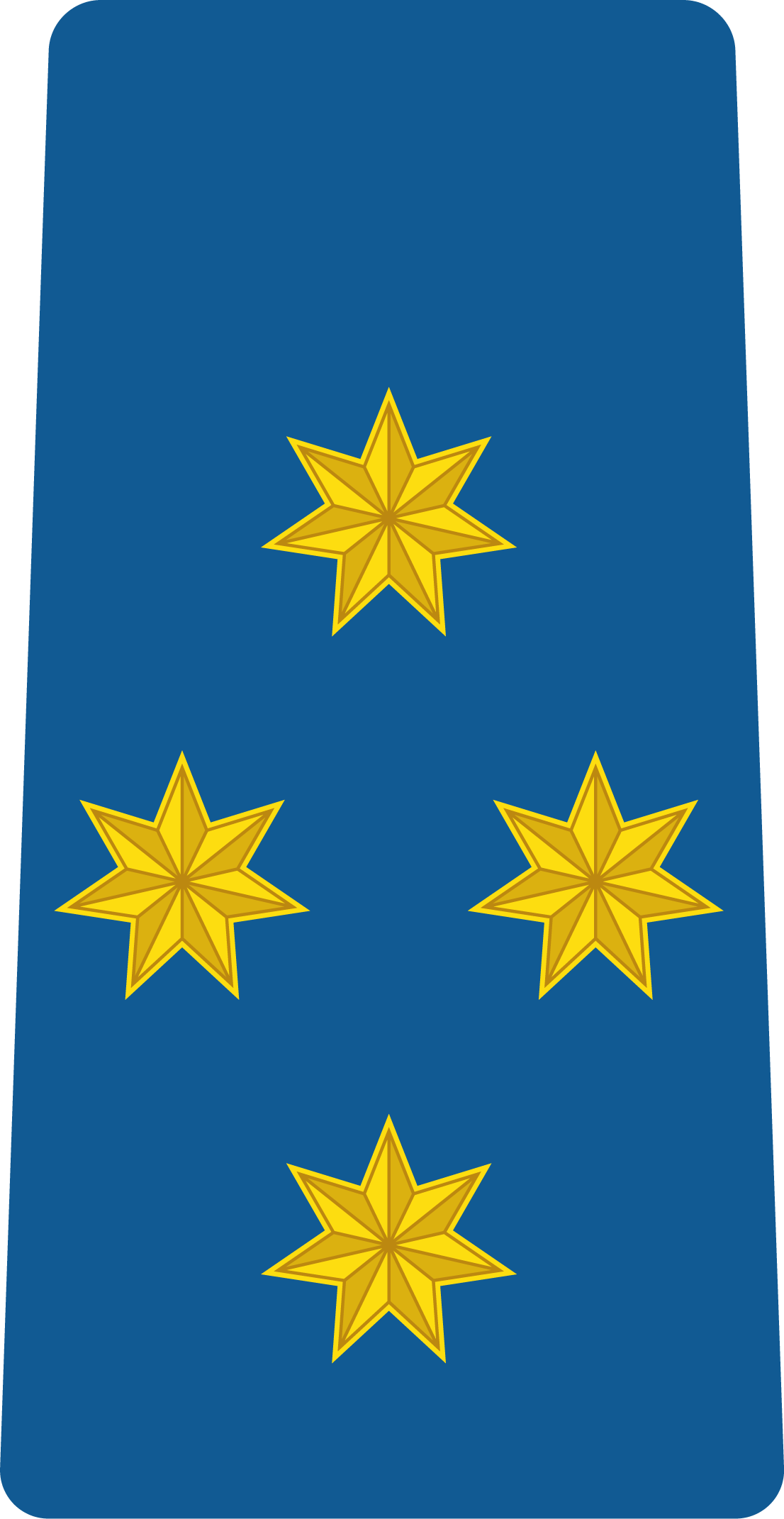
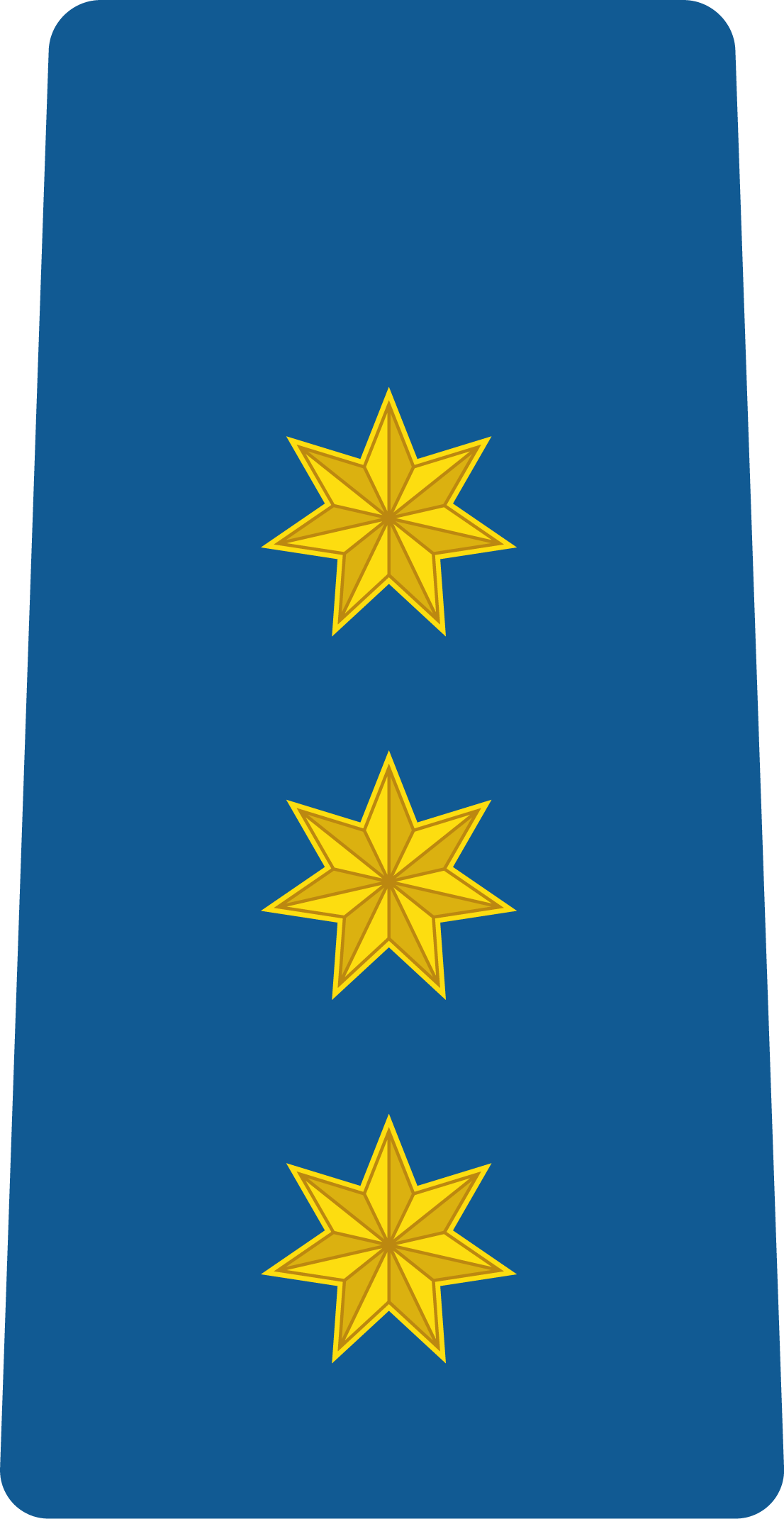
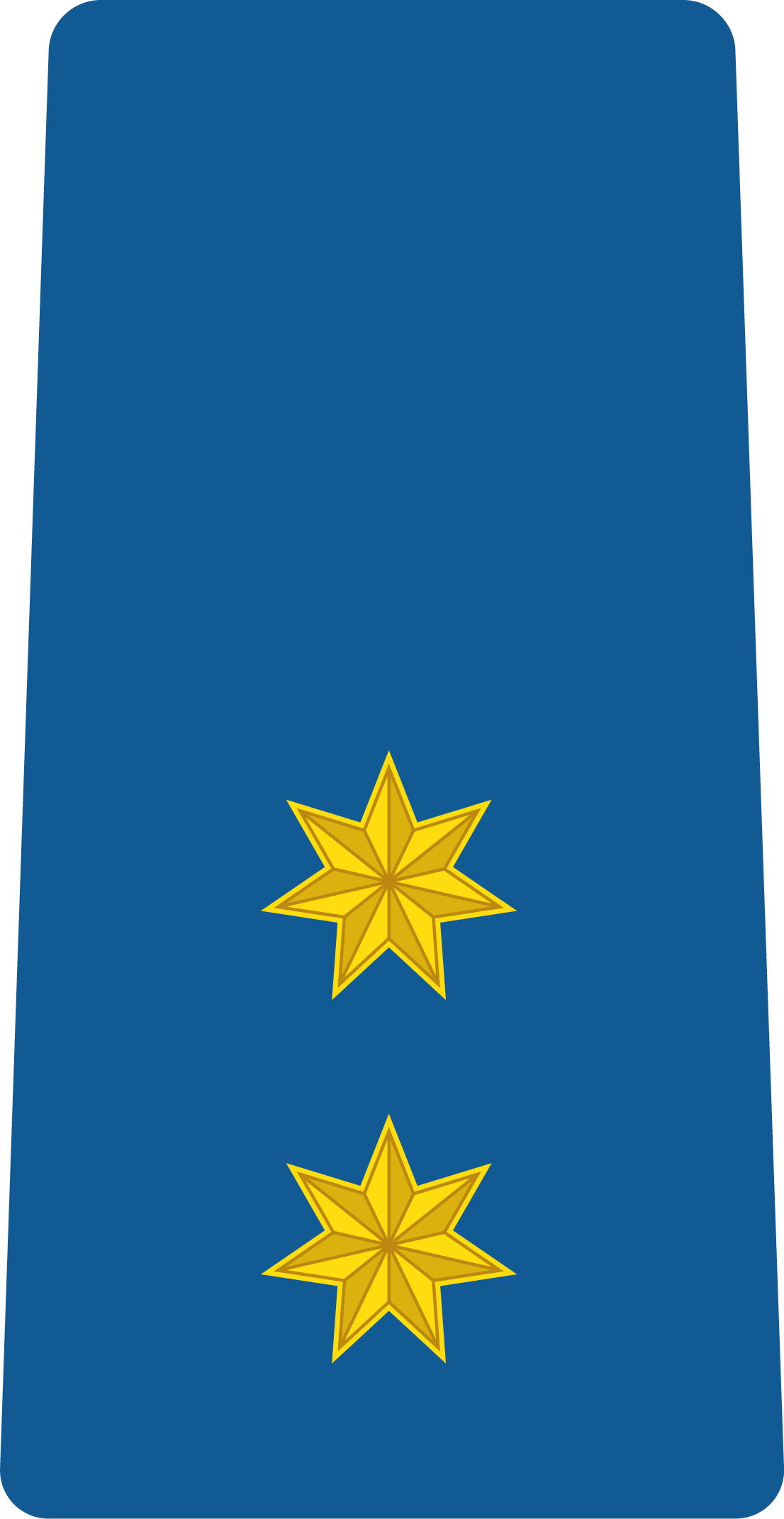
Rank group	General / flag officers				Senior officers			Junior officers
Georgian Land Forces
Georgian Land Forces	არმიის გენერალი Armiis generali	გენერალ ლეიტენანტი General leit’enant’i	გენერალ-მაიორი General-maiori	ბრიგადის გენერალი Brigadis generali	პოლკოვნიკი P’olk’ovnik’i	ვიცე-პოლკოვნიკი Vitse-p’olk’ovnik’i	მაიორი Maiori	კაპიტანი K’ap’it’ani	უფროსი ლეიტენანტი Uprosi leit’enant’i	ლეიტენანტი Leit’enant’i
Georgian Air Force
Georgian Air Force	არმიის გენერალი Armiis generali	გენერალ ლეიტენანტი General leit’enant’i	გენერალ მაიორი General maiori	ბრიგადის გენერალი Brigadis generali	პოლკოვნიკი P’olk’ovnik’i	ლეიტენანტ პოლკოვნიკი Leit’enant’ p’olk’ovnik’i	მაიორი Maiori	კაპიტანი K’ap’it’ani	უფროსი ლეიტენანტი Uprosi leit’enant’i	ლეიტენანტი Leit’enant’i
Rank group	General / flag officers				Senior officers			Junior officers

=== Other ranks ===
The rank insignia of non-commissioned officers and enlisted personnel.

Rank group	Senior NCOs				Junior NCOs			Enlisted
Georgian Land Forces
Georgian Land Forces	მთავარი სერჟანტი Mtavari serzhant’i	მასტერ-სერჟანტი Mast’er-serzhant’i	უფროსი სერჟანტი Uprosi serzhant’i	სერჟანტი Serzhant’i	უმცროსი სერჟანტი Umtsrosi serzhant’i	კაპრალ-სპეციალისტი K’ap’ral-sp’etsialist’i	კაპრალი K’ap’rali	I კლასის რიგითი I k’lasis rigiti	რიგითი Rigiti
Georgian Air Force
Georgian Air Force	მთავარი სერჟანტი Mtavari serzhant’i	მასტერ-სერჟანტი Mast’er-serzhant’i	უფროსი სერჟანტი Uprosi serzhant’i	სერჟანტი Serzhant’i	უმცროსი სერჟანტი Umtsrosi serzhant’i	კაპრალ-სპეციალისტი K’ap’ral-sp’etsialist’i	კაპრალი K’ap’rali	I კლასის რიგითი I k’lasis rigiti	რიგითი Rigiti
Rank group	Senior NCOs				Junior NCOs			Enlisted
