= List of populated places in Rize Province =

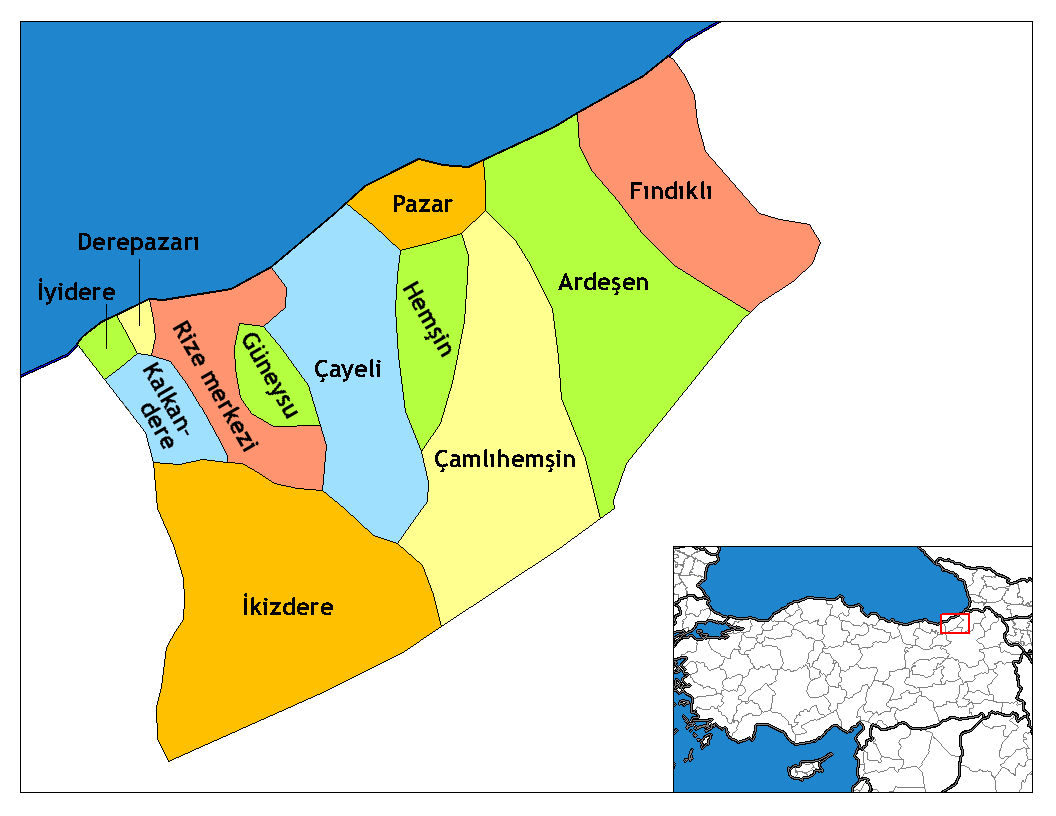
Rize Province

Below is the list of populated places in Rize Province, Turkey by the districts. In the following lists first place in each list is the administrative center of the district.

== Rize ==
- Rize
- Akarsu, Rize
- Akpınar, Rize
- Aktaş, Rize
- Alipaşa, Rize
- Ambarlık, Rize
- Ayane, Rize
- Azaklıhoca, Rize
- Balıkçılar, Rize
- Beştepe, Rize
- Bıldırcınköy, Rize
- Boğaz, Rize
- Camidağı, Rize
- Çaybaşı, Rize
- Çaycılar, Rize
- Çaykent, Rize
- Çiftekavak, Rize
- Çimenli, Rize
- Derebaşı, Rize
- Dörtyol, Rize
- Düzköy, Rize
- Elmalı, Rize
- Erenköy, Rize
- Gölgeli, Rize
- Gündoğdu, Rize
- Güzelköy, Rize
- Güzelyurt, Rize
- Karasu, Rize
- Karayemiş, Rize
- Kendirli, Rize
- Ketenli, Rize
- Kırklartepesi, Rize
- Kocatepe, Rize
- Köprülü, Rize
- Kurtuluş, Rize
- Küçükçayır, Rize
- Küçükköy, Rize
- Melek, Rize
- Muradiye, Rize
- Ortapazar, Rize
- Örnek, Rize
- Pazarköy, Rize
- Pekmezli, Rize
- Pınarbaşı, Rize
- Selimiye, Rize
- Soğukçeşme, Rize
- Söğütlü, Rize
- Sütlüce, Rize
- Taşköprü, Rize
- Taşlık, Rize
- Taşpınar, Rize
- Tekke, Rize
- Topkaya, Rize
- Tuğlalı, Rize
- Uzunköy, Rize
- Üçkaya, Rize
- Veliköy, Rize
- Yemişlik, Rize
- Yenidoğan, Rize
- Yenigüzelköy, Rize
- Yenikale, Rize
- Yenikasarcılar, Rize
- Yeniselimiye, Rize
- Yeşildere, Rize
- Yolüstü, Rize
- Yolveren, Rize
- Zincirliköprü, Rize

== Ardeşen ==
- Ardeşen
- Akdere, Ardeşen
- Akkaya, Ardeşen
- Armağan, Ardeşen
- Aşağıdurak, Ardeşen
- Bahar, Ardeşen
- Barış, Ardeşen
- Bayırcık, Ardeşen
- Beyazkaya, Ardeşen
- Çıraklar, Ardeşen
- Dere, Ardeşen
- Doğanay, Ardeşen
- Duygulu, Ardeşen
- Elmalık, Ardeşen
- Eskiarmutluk, Ardeşen
- Gündoğan, Ardeşen
- Güney, Ardeşen
- Hoşdere, Ardeşen
- Işıklı, Ardeşen
- Kahveciler, Ardeşen
- Kavaklıdere, Ardeşen
- Kirazlık, Ardeşen
- Konak, Ardeşen
- Köprüköy, Ardeşen
- Kurtuluş, Ardeşen
- Küçükköy, Ardeşen
- Manganez, Ardeşen
- Ortaalan, Ardeşen
- Özgür, Ardeşen
- Pınarlı, Ardeşen
- Pirinçlik, Ardeşen
- Serindere, Ardeşen
- Seslikaya, Ardeşen
- Sinan, Ardeşen
- Şehitlik, Ardeşen
- Şendere, Ardeşen
- Şentepe, Ardeşen
- Şenyamaç, Ardeşen
- Şenyurt, Ardeşen
- Tunca, Ardeşen
- Yamaçdere, Ardeşen
- Yavuz, Ardeşen
- Yayla, Ardeşen
- Yeniköy, Ardeşen
- Yeniyol, Ardeşen
- Yeşiltepe, Ardeşen
- Yukarıdurak, Ardeşen
- Yurtsever, Ardeşen
- Zeytinlik, Ardeşen

== Çamlıhemşin ==
- Çamlıhemşin
- Behice, Çamlıhemşin
- Boğaziçi, Çamlıhemşin
- Çatköy, Çamlıhemşin
- Çayırdüzü, Çamlıhemşin
- Dikkaya, Çamlıhemşin
- Güllüköy, Çamlıhemşin
- Güroluk, Çamlıhemşin
- Kale, Çamlıhemşin
- Köprübaşı, Çamlıhemşin
- Meydanköy, Çamlıhemşin
- Komilo
- Ortaklar, Çamlıhemşin
- Ortanköy, Çamlıhemşin
- Ortayayla, Çamlıhemşin
- Sıraköy, Çamlıhemşin
- Şenköy, Çamlıhemşin
- Şenyuva, Çamlıhemşin
- Topluca, Çamlıhemşin
- Ülkü, Çamlıhemşin
- Yaylaköy, Çamlıhemşin
- Yazlık, Çamlıhemşin
- Yolkıyı, Çamlıhemşin
- Yukarışimşirli, Çamlıhemşin
- Zilkale, Çamlıhemşin

== Çayeli ==
- Çayeli
- Abdullahhoca, Çayeli
- Armutlu, Çayeli
- Aşıklar, Çayeli
- Başköy, Çayeli
- Beşikçiler, Çayeli
- Beyazsu, Çayeli
- Buzlupınar, Çayeli
- Büyükköy, Çayeli
- Çataldere, Çayeli
- Çeşmeli, Çayeli
- Çınartepe, Çayeli
- Çilingir, Çayeli
- Çukurluhoca, Çayeli
- Demirhisar, Çayeli
- Derecik, Çayeli
- Düzgeçit, Çayeli
- Erdemli, Çayeli
- Erenler, Çayeli
- Esendağ, Çayeli
- Gemiciler, Çayeli
- Gürgenli, Çayeli
- Gürpınar, Çayeli
- Güzeltepe, Çayeli
- Haremtepe, Çayeli
- İncesırt, Çayeli
- İncesu, Çayeli
- Kaçkar, Çayeli
- Kaptanpaşa, Çayeli
- Karaağaç, Çayeli
- Kemerköy, Çayeli
- Kestanelik, Çayeli
- Köprübaşı, Çayeli
- Latifli, Çayeli
- Madenli, Çayeli
- Maltepe, Çayeli
- Musadağı, Çayeli
- Ormancık, Çayeli
- Ortaköy, Çayeli
- Sarısu, Çayeli
- Sefalı, Çayeli
- Selimiye, Çayeli
- Seslidere, Çayeli
- Sırtköy, Çayeli
- Şirinköy, Çayeli
- Uzundere, Çayeli
- Yamaç, Çayeli
- Yanıkdağ, Çayeli
- Yavuzlar, Çayeli
- Yenice, Çayeli
- Yenihisar, Çayeli
- Yenitepe, Çayeli
- Yeşilırmak, Çayeli
- Yeşilköy, Çayeli
- Yeşiltepe, Çayeli
- Yıldızeli, Çayeli
- Zafer, Çayeli

== Derepazarı ==
- Derepazarı
- Bahattinpaşa, Derepazarı
- Bürücek, Derepazarı
- Çakmakçılar, Derepazarı
- Çeşme, Derepazarı
- Çukurlu, Derepazarı
- Esentepe, Derepazarı
- Kirazdağı, Derepazarı
- Maltepe, Derepazarı
- Sandıktaş, Derepazarı
- Uzunkaya, Derepazarı
- Yanıktaş, Derepazarı

== Fındıklı ==
- Fındıklı
- Aksu, Fındıklı
- Arılı, Fındıklı
- Aslandere, Fındıklı
- Avcılar, Fındıklı
- Beydere, Fındıklı
- Cennet, Fındıklı
- Çağlayan, Fındıklı
- Çınarlı, Fındıklı
- Derbent, Fındıklı
- Doğanay, Fındıklı
- Gürsu, Fındıklı
- Hara, Fındıklı
- Hürriyet, Fındıklı
- Ihlamurlu, Fındıklı
- Karaali, Fındıklı
- Kıyıcık, Fındıklı
- Liman, Fındıklı
- Meyvalı, Fındıklı
- Saatköy, Fındıklı
- Sahil, Fındıklı
- Sulak, Fındıklı
- Sümer, Fındıklı
- Tatlısu, Fındıklı
- Tepecik, Fındıklı
- Yaylacılar, Fındıklı
- Yeniköy, Fındıklı
- Yenimahalle, Fındıklı
- Yenişehitlik, Fındıklı

== Güneysu ==
- Güneysu
- Asmalıırmak, Güneysu
- Ballıdere, Güneysu
- Başaran, Güneysu
- Başköy, Güneysu
- Bulutlu, Güneysu
- Çamlıca, Güneysu
- Dumankaya, Güneysu
- Güneli, Güneysu
- Gürgen, Güneysu
- İslahiye, Güneysu
- Kıbledağı, Güneysu
- Kiremit, Güneysu
- Ortaköy, Güneysu
- Selamet, Güneysu
- Tepebaşı, Güneysu
- Yarımada, Güneysu
- Yenicami, Güneysu
- Yeniköy, Güneysu
- Yeşilköy, Güneysu
- Yeşilyurt, Güneysu
- Yukarıislahiye, Güneysu
- Yüksekköy, Güneysu

== Hemşin ==
- Hemşin
- Akyamaç, Hemşin
- Bilenköy, Hemşin
- Çamlıtepe, Hemşin
- Hilal, Hemşin
- Kantarlı, Hemşin
- Leventköy, Hemşin
- Nurluca, Hemşin
- Yaltkaya, Hemşin

== İkizdere ==
- İkizdere
- Ayvalık, İkizdere
- Ballıköy, İkizdere
- Başköy, İkizdere
- Bayırköy, İkizdere
- Cevizlik, İkizdere
- Çamlıkköy, İkizdere
- Çataltepe, İkizdere
- Çiçekli, İkizdere
- Çifteköprü, İkizdere
- Demirkapı, İkizdere
- Dereköy, İkizdere
- Diktaş, İkizdere
- Eskice, İkizdere
- Gölyayla, İkizdere
- Güneyce, İkizdere
- Gürdere, İkizdere
- Güvenköy, İkizdere
- Ihlamur, İkizdere
- Ilıcaköy, İkizdere
- Kama, İkizdere
- Meşeköy, İkizdere
- Ortaköy, İkizdere
- Rüzgarlı, İkizdere
- Sivrikaya, İkizdere
- Şimşirli, İkizdere
- Tozköy, İkizdere
- Tulumpınar, İkizdere
- Yağcılar, İkizdere
- Yerelma, İkizdere

== İyidere ==
- İyidere
- Büyükçiftlikköyü, İyidere
- Çiftlik, İyidere
- Denizgören, İyidere
- Kalecik, İyidere
- Köşklü, İyidere
- Taşhane, İyidere
- Yaylacılar, İyidere

== Kalkandere ==
- Kalkandere
- Çağlayan, Kalkandere
- Çayırlı, Kalkandere
- Dilsizdağı, Kalkandere
- Dülgerli, Kalkandere
- Esendere, Kalkandere
- Esentepe, Kalkandere
- Fındıklı, Kalkandere
- Geçitli, Kalkandere
- Hurmalık, Kalkandere
- İnci, Kalkandere
- İncirli, Kalkandere
- Kayabaşı, Kalkandere
- Ormanlı, Kalkandere
- Seyrantepe, Kalkandere
- Soğuksu, Kalkandere
- Ünalan, Kalkandere
- Yenigeçitli, Kalkandere
- Yeniköy, Kalkandere
- Yeşilköy, Kalkandere
- Yokuşlu, Kalkandere
- Yolbaşı, Kalkandere
- Yumurtatepe, Kalkandere

== Pazar ==
- Pazar
- Akbucak, Pazar
- Akmescit, Pazar
- Aktaş, Pazar
- Aktepe, Pazar
- Alçılı, Pazar
- Ardaklı, Pazar
- Balıkçı, Pazar
- Başköy, Pazar
- Boğazlı, Pazar
- Bucak, Pazar
- Cumhuriyet, Pazar
- Dağdibi, Pazar
- Darılı, Pazar
- Derebaşı, Pazar
- Derinsu, Pazar
- Dernek, Pazar
- Elmalık, Pazar
- Gazi, Pazar
- Güney, Pazar
- Güzelyalı, Pazar
- Hamidiye, Pazar
- Handağı, Pazar
- Hasköy, Pazar
- Hisarlı, Pazar
- Irmak, Pazar
- Irmakyeniköy, Pazar
- İkiztepe, Pazar
- Kayağantaş, Pazar
- Kesikköprü, Pazar
- Kirazlık, Pazar
- Kocaköprü, Pazar
- Kukulat, Pazar
- Kuzayca, Pazar
- Merdivenli, Pazar
- Ocak, Pazar
- Ortaırmak, Pazar
- Ortayol, Pazar
- Örnek, Pazar
- Papatya, Pazar
- Sahilköy, Pazar
- Sessizdere, Pazar
- Sivrikale, Pazar
- Sivritepe, Pazar
- Subaşı, Pazar
- Suçatı, Pazar
- Sulak, Pazar
- Şehitlik, Pazar
- Şendere, Pazar
- Şentepe, Pazar
- Tektaş, Pazar
- Topluca, Pazar
- Tütüncüler, Pazar
- Uğrak, Pazar
- Yavuz, Pazar
- Yemişli, Pazar
- Yeşilköy, Pazar
- Yücehisar, Pazar
