= Alçılı, Pazar =

Alçılı Xanch'kuni
- Village
- Location in Turkey
- Coordinates: 41.1291°N 40.8683°E
- Country: Turkey
- Province: Rize
- District: Pazar
- Elevation: 264 m (866 ft)
- Population (2021): 368
- Time zone: UTC+3 (TRT)

Alçılı is a village in the Pazar District, Rize Province, in the Black Sea Region of Turkey. Its population is 368 (2021).

== History ==
According to the list of villages in Laz language book (2009), the name of the village is Xanch'kuni. Most villagers are ethnically Laz.

== Geography ==
The village is located 5 kilometres (3.1 mi) away from Pazar. It is surrounded by the Aktepe, Aktaş, Dağdibi and Yavuzköy villages.
