= Cumhuriyet, Pazar =

Cumhuriyet Noghadixa
- Neighbourhood
- Location in Turkey
- Coordinates: 41°9′56″N 40°52′49″E
- Country: Turkey
- Province: Rize
- District: Pazar District
- Municipality: Pazar
- Population (2021): 1,220
- Time zone: UTC+3 (TRT)

Cumhuriyet is a neighbourhood of the town Pazar, Pazar District, Rize Province, northeastern Turkey. Its population is 1,220 (2021).

== History ==
According to list of villages in Laz language book (2009), name of the neighborhood is Noghadixa , which means "bazaar village". Most inhabitants of the neighbourhood are ethnically Laz.
