= Yavuzköy, Pazar =

Yavuzköy Noxlapsu (Laz language)
- Village
- Country: Turkey
- Province: Rize
- District: Pazar
- Elevation: 286 m (938 ft)
- Population (2021): 163
- Time zone: UTC+3 (TRT)

Yavuzköy (also: Yavuz) is a village in the Pazar District, Rize Province, in Black Sea Region of Turkey. Its population is 163 (2021).

== History ==
According to list of villages in Laz language book (2009), name of the village is Noxlapsu. Most villagers are ethnically Laz. Village was part of Hasköy, before gaining village status.

== Geography ==
The village is located 14 kilometres (8.7 mi) away from Pazar.
