= İkiztepe, Pazar =

İkiztepe Laroz
- Neighbourhood
- Country: Turkey
- Province: Rize
- District: Pazar District
- Municipality: Pazar
- Population (2021): 430
- Time zone: UTC+3 (TRT)

İkiztepe is a neighbourhood of the town Pazar, Pazar District, Rize Province, northeastern Turkey. Its population is 430 (2021).

== History ==
According to list of villages in Laz language book (2009), name of the neighborhood is Larozi or Laroni. Most inhabitants of the neighbourhood are ethnically Laz.
