= Ocak, Pazar =

Ocak Sapu (Laz language)
- Neighbourhood
- Location in Turkey
- Coordinates: 41°9′34″N 40°55′43″E
- Country: Turkey
- Province: Rize
- District: Pazar District
- Municipality: Pazar
- Population (2021): 1,180
- Time zone: UTC+3 (TRT)

Ocak is a neighbourhood of the town Pazar, Pazar District, Rize Province, northeastern Turkey. Its population is 1,180 (2021).

== History ==
According to list of villages in Laz language book (2009), the name of the village is Sapu, which is derived from word "sapule", which means cemetery in the Laz language. Most villagers are ethnically Laz.

== Geography ==
The village is located 5 kilometres (3.1 mi) away from Pazar.
