= Kirazlık, Pazar =

Kirazlık Bulep (Laz language)
- Neighbourhood
- Location in Turkey
- Coordinates: 41°10′44″N 40°54′4″E
- Country: Turkey
- Province: Rize
- District: Pazar District
- Municipality: Pazar
- Population (2021): 4,568
- Time zone: UTC+3 (TRT)

Kirazlık (Laz: ბულეფი, romanized: Bulepi) is a neighbourhood of the town Pazar, Pazar District, Rize Province, northeastern Turkey. Its population is 4,568 (2021).

== History ==
According to list of villages in Laz language book (2009), name of the neighborhood is Bulep, which is derived from the word "mbulepi" and means "cherries". Most inhabitants of the neighbourhood are ethnically Laz.
