= Güzelyalı, Pazar =

Güzelyalı Duduvati (Laz language)
- Neighbourhood
- Location in Turkey
- Coordinates: 41°10′40″N 40°54′39″E
- Country: Turkey
- Province: Rize
- District: Pazar District
- Municipality: Pazar
- Population (2021): 1,473
- Time zone: UTC+3 (TRT)

Güzelyalı is a neighbourhood of the town Pazar, Pazar District, Rize Province, northeastern Turkey. Its population is 1,473 (2021).

== History ==
According to list of villages in Laz language book (2009), name of the neighborhood is Duduvati. Most inhabitants of the neighbourhood are ethnically Laz.
