= Sivritepe, Pazar =

Sivritepe Skefenivat (Laz language)
- Village
- Country: Turkey
- Province: Rize
- District: Pazar
- Population (2021): 117
- Time zone: UTC+3 (TRT)

Sivritepe is a village in the Pazar District, Rize Province, in Black Sea Region of Turkey. Its population is 117 (2021).

== History ==
According to list of villages in Laz language book (2009), name of the village is Skefenivat. Most villagers are ethnically Laz.

== Geography ==
The village is located 9 kilometres (5.6 mi) away from Pazar.
