= Hamidiye, Pazar =

Hamidiye K'utsuma (Laz language)
- Village
- Location in Turkey
- Coordinates: 41°10′41″N 40°57′9″E
- Country: Turkey
- Province: Rize
- District: Pazar
- Elevation: 53 m (174 ft)
- Population (2021): 1,452
- Time zone: UTC+3 (TRT)

Hamidiye is a village in the Pazar District, Rize Province, in Black Sea Region of Turkey. Its population is 1,452 (2021).

== History ==
According to list of villages in Laz language book (2009), name of the village is K'utsuma. Most villagers are ethnically Laz and Georgian. According to Armenian traveller Minas Bijishkyan's book (1819), name of the village is Eski Trabzon which means "Old Trabzon" in Turkish.

== Geography ==
The village is located 7 kilometres (4.3 mi) away from Pazar.
