= Suçatı, Pazar =

Suçatı Apso (Laz language)
- Village
- Location in Turkey
- Coordinates: 41°6′2″N 40°53′7″E
- Country: Turkey
- Province: Rize
- District: Pazar
- Elevation: 252 m (827 ft)
- Population (2021): 346
- Time zone: UTC+3 (TRT)

Suçatı is a village in the Pazar District, Rize Province, in Black Sea Region of Turkey. Its population is 346 (2021).

== History ==
According to list of villages in Laz language book (2009), name of the village is Apso. Most villagers are ethnically Laz.

== Geography ==
The village is located 10 kilometres (6.2 mi) away from Pazar.
