= Yeşilköy, Pazar =

Yeşilköy Cumbat (Laz language)
- Village
- Country: Turkey
- Province: Rize
- District: Pazar
- Population (2021): 96
- Time zone: UTC+3 (TRT)

Yeşilköy is a village in the Pazar District, Rize Province, in Black Sea Region of Turkey. Its population is 96 (2021). Rize–Artvin Airport is located in this village.

== History ==
According to list of villages in Laz language book (2009), name of the village is Cumbat. Most villagers are ethnically Laz.

== Geography ==
The village is located 4 kilometres (2.5 mi) away from Pazar.
