= Kocaköprü, Pazar =

Kocaköprü Abdoghlu
- Neighbourhood
- Location in Turkey
- Coordinates: 41°08′52″N 40°54′27″E
- Country: Turkey
- Province: Rize
- District: Pazar District
- Municipality: Pazar
- Population (2021): 895
- Time zone: UTC+3 (TRT)

Kocaköprü is a neighbourhood of the town Pazar, Pazar District, Rize Province, northeastern Turkey. Its population is 895 (2021).

== History ==
Old names of the neighborhood are Abdoğlu and Xotri. Most inhabitants of the neighbourhood are ethnically Laz.
