= Derebaşı, Pazar =

Derebaşı Tsuk'it'a (Laz language)
- Village
- Location in Turkey
- Coordinates: 41°9′50″N 40°56′33″E
- Country: Turkey
- Province: Rize
- District: Pazar
- Elevation: 252 m (827 ft)
- Population (2021): 379
- Time zone: UTC+3 (TRT)

Derebaşı is a village in the Pazar District, Rize Province, in Black Sea Region of Turkey. Its population is 379 (2021).

== History ==
According to list of villages in Laz language book (2009), name of the village is Tsuk'it'a, which means "laurel tree". Most villagers are ethnically Laz and Hemshin.

== Geography ==
The village is located 8 kilometres (5.0 mi) away from Pazar.
