= Subaşı, Pazar =

Subaşı Xachapit (Laz language)
- Village
- Country: Turkey
- Province: Rize
- District: Pazar
- Elevation: 541 m (1,775 ft)
- Population (2021): 474
- Time zone: UTC+3 (TRT)

Subaşı is a village in the Pazar District, Rize Province, in Black Sea Region of Turkey. Its population is 474 (2021).

== History ==
According to list of villages in Laz language book (2009), name of the village is Xachapit, which means "churchyard" in Laz language. Most villagers are ethnically Hemshin.

== Geography ==
The village is located 9 kilometres (5.6 mi) away from Pazar.
