= Kesikköprü, Pazar =

Kesikköprü Xudisa
- Village
- Country: Turkey
- Province: Rize
- District: Pazar
- Elevation: 108 m (354 ft)
- Population (2021): 450
- Time zone: UTC+3 (TRT)

Kesikköprü is a village in the Pazar District, Rize Province, in Black Sea Region of Turkey. Its population is 450 (2021).

== History ==
According to list of villages in Laz language book (2009), name of the village is Xudisa. Most villagers are ethnically Laz.

== Geography ==
The village is located 6 kilometres (3.7 mi) away from Pazar.
