= Irmakköy, Pazar =

Irmakköy Mamakivat (Laz language)
- Village
- Location in Turkey
- Coordinates: 41°7′46″N 40°57′3″E
- Country: Turkey
- Province: Rize
- District: Pazar
- Elevation: 252 m (827 ft)
- Population (2021): 578
- Time zone: UTC+3 (TRT)

Irmakköy (also: Irmak) is a village in the Pazar District, Rize Province, in Black Sea Region of Turkey. Its population is 578 (2021). Besides the main village Irmakköy, it contains 11 hamlets, including Adakli (Laz name: P'açilati).

== History ==
According to list of villages in Laz language book (2009), name of the village is Mamakivat, which means "Mamaki village". Most villagers are ethnically Laz.

== Geography ==
The village is located 12 kilometres (7.5 mi) away from Pazar.
