= Uğrak, Pazar =

Uğrak Çingit (Laz language)
- Village
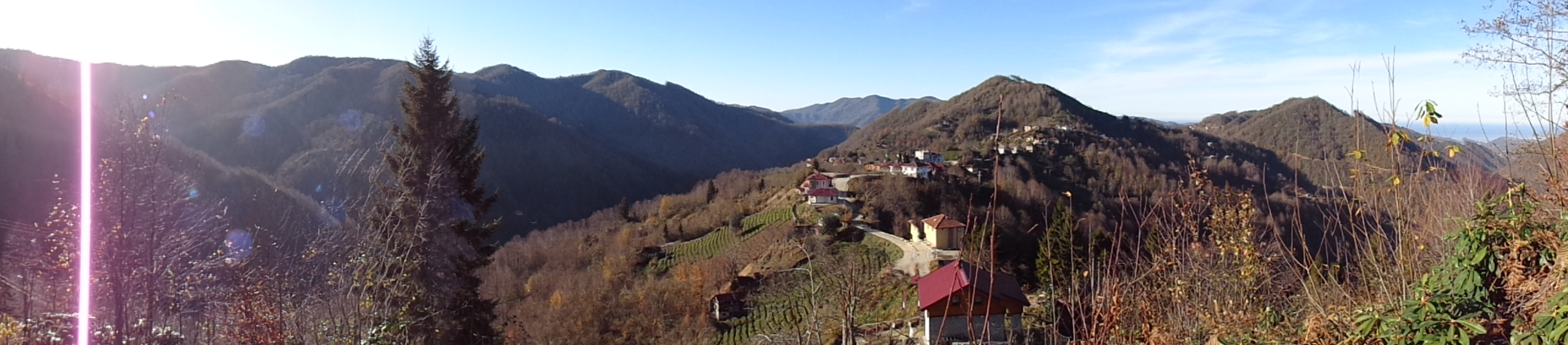

- Location within Turkey
- Country: Turkey
- Province: Rize
- District: Pazar
- Elevation: 508 m (1,667 ft)
- Population (2021): 118
- Time zone: UTC+3 (TRT)

Uğrak is a village in the Pazar District, Rize Province, in Black Sea Region of Turkey. Its population is 118 (2021).

== History ==
According to list of villages in Laz language book (2009), name of the village is Çingiti, which means "expatriate village". Most villagers are ethnically Laz.

== Geography ==
The village is located 14 kilometres (8.7 mi) away from Pazar.
