= Şehitlik, Pazar =

Şehitlik Xaku (Laz language)
- Village
- Country: Turkey
- Province: Rize
- District: Pazar
- Elevation: 373 m (1,224 ft)
- Population (2021): 375
- Time zone: UTC+3 (TRT)

Şehitlik is a village in the Pazar District, Rize Province, in Black Sea Region of Turkey. Its population is 375 (2021).

== History ==
According to list of villages in Laz language book (2009), name of the village is Mxak'u, which means "a water bug". Most villagers are ethnically Laz.

== Geography ==
The village is located 14 kilometres (8.7 mi) away from Pazar.
