= Yücehisar =

Yücehisar Lamgho (Laz language)
- Village
- Location in Turkey
- Coordinates: 41°06′53″N 40°54′29″E
- Country: Turkey
- Province: Rize
- District: Pazar
- Elevation: 261 m (856 ft)
- Population (2021): 255
- Time zone: UTC+3 (TRT)

Yücehisar is a village in the Pazar District, Rize Province, in Black Sea Region of Turkey. Its population is 255 (2021).

== History ==
According to list of villages in Laz language book (2009), name of the village is Lamgho. Most villagers are ethnically Laz.

== Geography ==
The village is located 8 kilometres (5.0 mi) away from Pazar.
