= Derinsu, Pazar =

Derinsu Zanati (Laz language)
- Village
- Country: Turkey
- Province: Rize
- District: Pazar
- Elevation: 330 m (1,080 ft)
- Population (2021): 176
- Time zone: UTC+3 (TRT)

Derinsu is a village in the Pazar District, Rize Province, in Black Sea Region of Turkey. Its population is 176 (2021).

== History ==
According to list of villages in Laz language book (2009), name of the village is Zanati, which means "Laz homeland". Most villagers are ethnically Laz.

== Geography ==
The village is located 14 kilometres (8.7 mi) away from Pazar.
