= Şentepe, Pazar =

Şentepe Ghulivat (Laz language)
- Village
- Country: Turkey
- Province: Rize
- District: Pazar
- Elevation: 275 m (902 ft)
- Population (2021): 34
- Time zone: UTC+3 (TRT)

Şentepe is a village in the Pazar District, Rize Province, in Black Sea Region of Turkey. Its population is 34 (2021).

== History ==
According to list of villages in Laz language book (2009), the name of the village is Ghulivat, which means "Ghuli homeland". Most villagers are ethnically Laz.

== Geography ==
The village is located 16 kilometres (9.9 mi) away from Pazar.
