= Yemişli, Pazar =

Yemişli İlastas
- Village
- Location in Turkey
- Coordinates: 41°09′11″N 40°55′01″E
- Country: Turkey
- Province: Rize
- District: Pazar
- Elevation: 100 m (330 ft)
- Population (2021): 396
- Time zone: UTC+3 (TRT)

Yemişli is a village in the Pazar District, Rize Province, in Black Sea Region of Turkey. Its population is 396 (2021).

== History ==
According to list of villages in Laz language book (2009), name of the village is İlastas. Most villagers are ethnically Laz.

== Geography ==
The village is located 5 kilometres (3.1 mi) away from Pazar.
