= Darılı, Pazar =

Darılı Aranashi
- Village
- Country: Turkey
- Province: Rize
- District: Pazar
- Elevation: 252 m (827 ft)
- Population (2021): 151
- Time zone: UTC+3 (TRT)

Darılı is a village in the Pazar District, Rize Province, in Black Sea Region of Turkey. Its population is 151 (2021).

== History ==
According to list of villages in Laz language book (2009), name of the village is Aranashi. Most villagers are ethnically Laz.

== Geography ==
The village is located 4 kilometres (2.5 mi) away from Pazar.
