= Topluca, Pazar =

Topluca Mesemit (Laz language)
- Village
- Country: Turkey
- Province: Rize
- District: Pazar
- Population (2021): 151
- Time zone: UTC+3 (TRT)

Topluca is a village in the Pazar District, Rize Province, in Black Sea Region of Turkey. Its population is 151 (2021).

== History ==
According to list of villages in Laz language book (2009), name of the village is Mesemit'i. Most villagers are ethnically Laz.
