= Kuzayca, Pazar =

Kuzayca Surminat (Laz language)
- Village
- Country: Turkey
- Province: Rize
- District: Pazar
- Elevation: 252 m (827 ft)
- Population (2021): 278
- Time zone: UTC+3 (TRT)

Kuzayca is a village in the Pazar District, Rize Province, in Black Sea Region of Turkey. Its population is 278 (2021).

== History ==
According to list of villages in Laz language book (2009), name of the village is Surminat, which means "people from Sürmene". Most villagers are ethnically Laz or Hemshin.

== Geography ==
The village is located 13 kilometres (8.1 mi) away from Pazar.
