= Hisarlı, Pazar =

Hisarlı Koksovat (Laz language)
- Village
- Country: Turkey
- Province: Rize
- District: Pazar
- Elevation: 252 m (827 ft)
- Population (2021): 243
- Time zone: UTC+3 (TRT)

Hisarlı is a village in the Pazar District, Rize Province, in Black Sea Region of Turkey. Its population is 243 (2021).

== History ==
According to list of villages in Laz language book (2009), name of the village is Koksovat / Koskovat, which means "Kosto homeland". Most villagers are ethnically Laz.

== Geography ==
The village is located 7 kilometres (4.3 mi) away from Pazar.
