= Rize–Artvin Airport =

Civil airport in Turkey

Rize–Artvin Airport Rize–Artvin Havalimanı
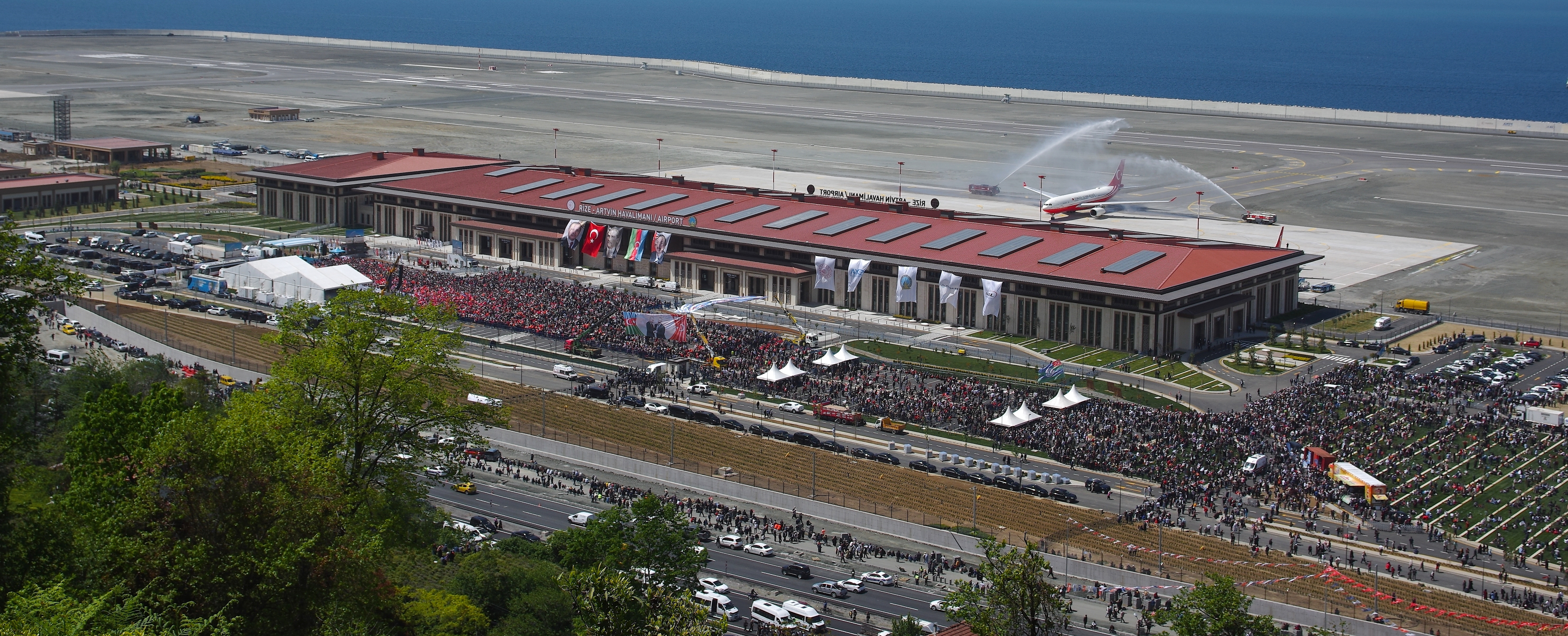
- IATA: RZV; ICAO: LTFO

Summary
- Airport type: Public
- Serves: Rize and Artvin, Turkey
- Location: Pazar, Rize, Turkey
- Opened: 14 May 2022; 4 years ago
- Coordinates: 41°10′09″N 40°49′44″E

Map
- Location of airport in Turkey

Runways
Direction	Length		Surface
Direction	m	ft	Surface
06/24	3,000	9,800	Asphalt

Statistics (2025)
- Annual passenger capacity: 3,000,000
- Passengers: 1,161,135
- Passenger change 2024–25: ▲6%
- Aircraft movements: 7,829
- Movements change 2024–25: ▲4%

Rize–Artvin Airport (Turkish: Rize–Artvin Havalimanı) (IATA: RZV, ICAO: LTFO) is an airport off the coast of Rize Province, northeastern Turkey.

== Overview ==
The airport was opened for commercial business on 14 May 2022, with Turkish Airlines, soon followed on the same day with AJet. On 3 July 2022, Pegasus Airlines also began operating to the airport. On 1 July 2023, SalamAir started seasonal operations to Muscat in Oman internationally, making this the airport's first international route.

The airport is situated off the coast of Yeşilköy village in Pazar district of Rize Province. It is 34 km (21 mi) east of Rize and about 75 km (47 mi) west of Artvin. It was constructed on ground obtained through filling a part of the Black Sea shore by rocks brought from nearby quarries in Merdivenli, Hisarlı, Kanlımezra and Kuzeyce. To fill up to 30 m (98 ft)-deep sea, at least 85 million tons of rock was required. The airport building covers an area of 4,500 m^{2} (48,000 sq ft), and the runway is 3,000 m (9,800 ft) long at 45 m (148 ft) width parallel to the seashore. The construction works began with groundbreaking in 2017. It is the country's second airport of its sort following Ordu–Giresun Airport. It is expected that the airport will serve about two million passengers annually. The construction cost was budgeted to ₺750 million (approx. US$206 million).

== Airlines and destinations ==
The following airlines operate regular scheduled and charter flights at Rize–Artvin Airport:

Airlines	Destinations
AJet	Ankara, Istanbul–Sabiha Gökçen
Flynas	Seasonal: Jeddah, Riyadh
Jazeera Airways	Seasonal: Kuwait City
Pegasus Airlines	Istanbul–Sabiha Gökçen, Izmir
SalamAir	Seasonal: Muscat
Turkish Airlines	Istanbul; Seasonal: Gassim, Jeddah, Riyadh

== Traffic statistics ==
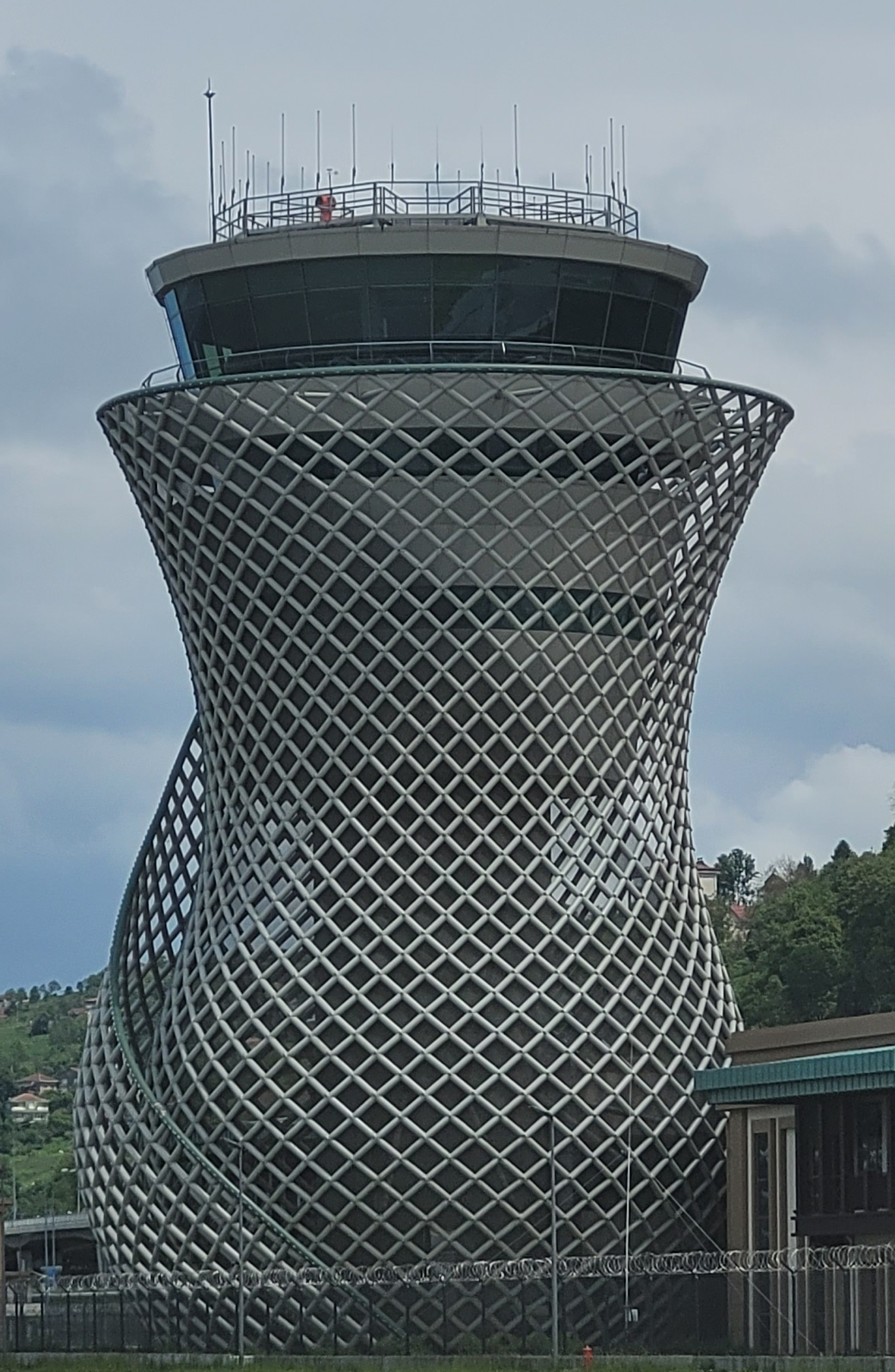
Air traffic control tower at the airport, inspired by the traditional Turkish tea glass

Rize–Artvin Airport passenger traffic statistics
Year (months)	Domestic	% change	International	% change	Total	% change
2025	1,129,518	▲5%	31,617	▲63%	1,161,135	▲6%
2024	1,078,375	▲6%	19,453	▲167%	1,097,828	▲7%
2023	1,016,627	▲93%	7,294	▲580%	1,023,921	▲94%
2022	525,807	Steady	1,073	Steady	526,880	Steady

^1: 2022 statistics correspond to the last 7 months of 2022 since the opening of the airport.
