= Papatya, Pazar =

Papatya Papat (Laz language)
- Village
- Country: Turkey
- Province: Rize
- District: Pazar
- Population (2021): 255
- Time zone: UTC+3 (TRT)

Papatya is a village in the Pazar District, Rize Province, in Black Sea Region of Turkey. Its population is 255 (2021).

== History ==
According to list of villages in Laz language book (2009), name of the village is Papat, which means "pastor village". Most villagers are ethnically Laz.

== Geography ==
The village is located 5 kilometres (3.1 mi) away from Pazar.
