= Kayağantaş, Pazar =

Kayağantaş Sitori (Laz language)
- Village
- Location in Turkey
- Coordinates: 41°07′24″N 41°00′03″E
- Country: Turkey
- Province: Rize
- District: Pazar
- Elevation: 764 m (2,507 ft)
- Population (2021): 40
- Time zone: UTC+3 (TRT)

Kayağantaş is a village in the Pazar District, Rize Province, in Black Sea Region of Turkey. Its population is 40 (2021).

== History ==
According to list of villages in Laz language book (2009), name of the village is Sitori. Most villagers are ethnically Laz.

== Geography ==
The village is located 17 kilometres (11 mi) away from Pazar.
