= Akmescit, Pazar =

Akmescit Mcacivati (Laz language)
- Village
- Location in Turkey
- Coordinates: 41.1519°N 40.8858°E
- Country: Turkey
- Province: Rize
- District: Pazar
- Elevation: 252 m (827 ft)
- Population (2021): 236
- Time zone: UTC+3 (TRT)

Akmescit is a village in the Pazar District, Rize Province, in Black Sea Region of Turkey. Its population is 236 (2021).

== History ==
According to list of villages in Laz language book (2009), name of the village is Mcacivati, which means "with fly". Most villagers are ethnically Laz.

== Geography ==
The village is located 4 kilometres (2.5 mi) away from Pazar.
