= Güneyköy, Pazar =

Güneyköy Avramit (Laz language)
- Village
- Location in Turkey
- Coordinates: 41.1286°N 40.8183°E
- Country: Turkey
- Province: Rize
- District: Pazar
- Elevation: 508 m (1,667 ft)
- Population (2021): 354
- Time zone: UTC+3 (TRT)

Güneyköy (also: Güney) is a village in the Pazar District, Rize Province, in Black Sea Region of Turkey. Its population is 354 (2021).

== History ==
According to list of villages in Laz language book (2009), name of the village is Avramit, which means "Ibrahim homeland". Most villagers are ethnically Laz.

== Geography ==
The village is located 11 kilometres (6.8 mi) away from Pazar.
