= Amlakit Plateau =

Amlakit Plateau Hamlakit Plateau
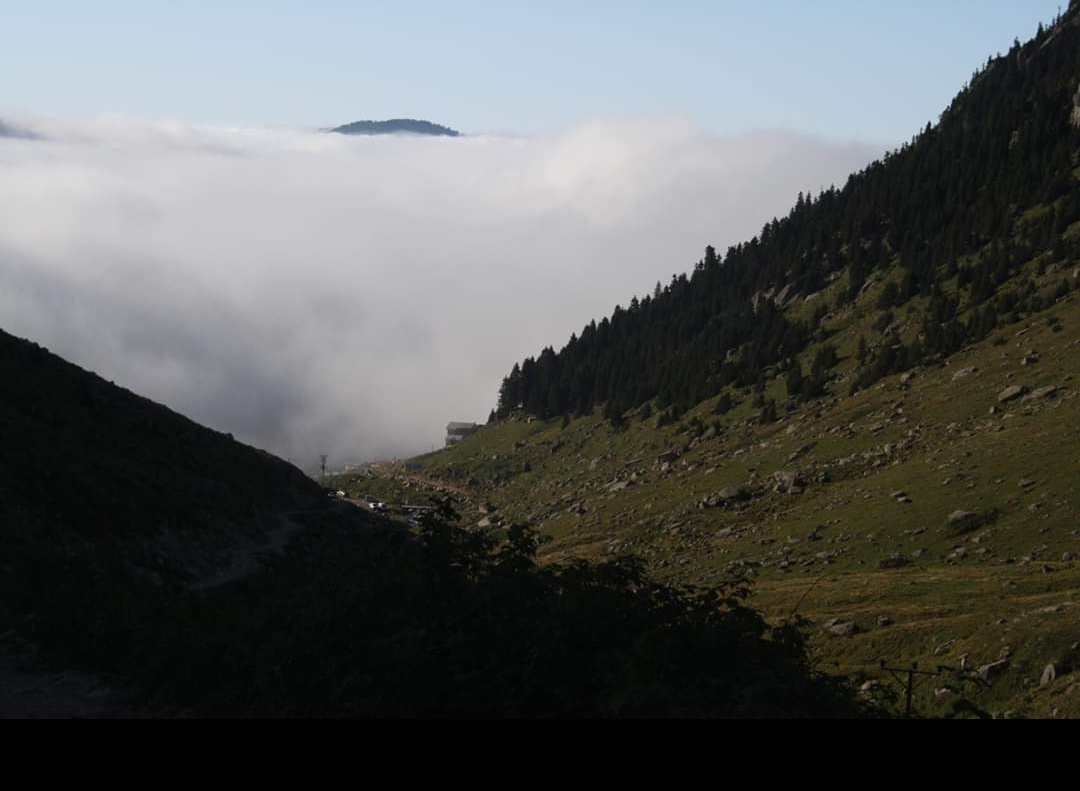
- Amlakit Plateau (September 2012)
- Interactive map of Amlakit Plateau
- Coordinates: 40°54′0″N 41°4′21″E
- Country: Turkey
- Province: Rize
- District: Çamlıhemşin
- Elevation: 1,900–2,200 m (6,200–7,200 ft)
- Time zone: UTC+3 (TRT)

The Amlakit Plateau also known as Hamlakit Plateau, is a plateau located in Çamlıhemşin District of Rize Province, Turkey. The plateau is famous for its Varvator festivals. A source from 2005 stated that there was a coffeehouse, a grocery store, a mosque, a guesthouse and around 50 wooden plateau houses present, which were mostly active during the summer months.

== Location ==
The plateau spans 1900 and 2200 meters in elevation. It is positioned below Palovit Plateau, adjacent to the pine groves in the valley descending to Zilkale. It is one of the plateaus that is easier to reach compared to others in the region. The plateau is 55 kilometers from Çamlıhemşin town center and 83.8 kilometers from Rize-Artvin Airport. Palovit Stream divides the plateau into two parts.

To the west of the Amlakit plateau is the Kotençur Plateau, also known as the Upper Amlakit Plateau, at an elevation of 2250–2300 meters.

== Demography ==
Amlakit Plateau is regularly used by the residents of Aşağı Çamlıca neighborhood (A. Vice), Yukarı Çamlıca neighborhood (Y. Vice), Boğaziçi village (Tumaslı-Pogina and Ovaklı neighborhoods), Ortan village, Hala village, Aşağı Şimşirli neighborhood (Çuklanut) and Bahçeli Konaklar neighborhood (Habak - Citne). In the plateau used by the Hemshin people, men and women were dancing horon together even in the 1970s. A type of horon is named after the plateau.

== Tourism and facilities ==
The plateau is a popular destination for camping and is one of the preferred locations for tourists. There were 300 visitors to the plateau in 1991, 400 in 2002 and 750 in 2009. The plateau is considered suitable for nature walks and ecotourism activities. The villages have had electricity since 2001. According to 2014 data, phones generally do not have signal in the region.

== Flora ==
Plant species present on the plateau include

- Cystopteris fragilis
- Pteridium aquilinum
- Dryopteris dilatata
- Dryopteris remot
- Dryopteris filix-mas
- Dryopteris × initalis
- Dryopteris expansa
- Polystichum aculeatum
- Polystichum lonchitis
- Equisetum arvense
- Equisetum palustre
- Botrychium lunaria
- Polypodium vulgare
- Cryptogramma crispa
- Thelypteris (Oreopteris) limbosperma
- Phegopteris connectilis
- Isothecium holtii
- Scilla monanthos
- Riccardia palmata
- Blepharostoma trichophyllum
- Rhododendron caucasicum
