= Sivrikale, Pazar =

Sivrikale Tordovat (Laz language)
- Village
- Location in Turkey
- Coordinates: 41°09′46″N 40°50′04″E
- Country: Turkey
- Province: Rize
- District: Pazar
- Elevation: 264 m (866 ft)
- Population (2021): 158
- Time zone: UTC+3 (TRT)

Sivrikale is a village in the Pazar District, Rize Province, in Black Sea Region of Turkey. Its population is 158 (2021).

== History ==
According to list of villages in Laz language book (2009), name of the village is Tordovat. Most villagers are ethnically Laz.

== Geography ==
The village is located 7 kilometres (4.3 mi) away from Pazar.
