= Şendere, Pazar =

Şendere Bogina (Laz language)
- Village
- Country: Turkey
- Province: Rize
- District: Pazar
- Elevation: 508 m (1,667 ft)
- Population (2021): 133
- Time zone: UTC+3 (TRT)

Şendere is a village in the Pazar District, Rize Province, in Black Sea Region of Turkey. Its population is 133 (2021).

== History ==
According to list of villages in Laz language book (2009), name of the village is Bogina, which means "highland house" in Laz language. Most villagers are ethnically Hemshin.

== Geography ==
The village is located 11 kilometres (6.8 mi) away from Pazar.
