= Başköy, Pazar =

Başköy Petre Nikolai (Laz language)
- Village
- Location in Turkey
- Coordinates: 41.0888°N 40.8911°E
- Country: Turkey
- Province: Rize
- District: Pazar
- Elevation: 508 m (1,667 ft)
- Population (2021): 249
- Time zone: UTC+3 (TRT)

Başköy is a village in the Pazar District, Rize Province, in Black Sea Region of Turkey. Its population is 249 (2021).

== History ==
According to list of villages in Laz language book (2009), name of the village is Petre Nikolai, which means "Pastor Nikola" in Laz language. Most villagers are ethnically Hemshin.

== Geography ==
The village is located 13 kilometres (8.1 mi) away from Pazar.
