= Handağı, Pazar =

Handağı Dadivat (Laz language)
- Village
- Location in Turkey
- Coordinates: 41°07′30″N 40°58′16″E
- Country: Turkey
- Province: Rize
- District: Pazar
- Elevation: 591 m (1,939 ft)
- Population (2021): 254
- Time zone: UTC+3 (TRT)

Handağı is a village in the Pazar District, Rize Province, in Black Sea Region of Turkey. Its population is 254 (2021).

== History ==
According to list of villages in Laz language book (2009), name of the village is Dadivati, which means "village of aunt". Most villagers are ethnically Laz.

== Geography ==
The village is located 15 kilometres (9.3 mi) away from Pazar.
