= Boğazlı, Pazar =

Boğazlı Chiketore (Laz language)
- Village
- Location in Turkey
- Coordinates: 41.1255°N 40.9336°E
- Country: Turkey
- Province: Rize
- District: Pazar
- Elevation: 477 m (1,565 ft)
- Population (2021): 448
- Time zone: UTC+3 (TRT)

Boğazlı is a village in the Pazar District, Rize Province, in Black Sea Region of Turkey. Its population is 448 (2021).

== History ==
As of 1876, the name of the village was Chiketore, which means "place of Gypsies". Most villagers are ethnically Laz.

== Geography ==
The village is located 9 kilometres (5.6 mi) away from Pazar.
