= Aktaş, Pazar =

Aktaş Xonari (Laz language)
- Village
- Location in Turkey
- Coordinates: 41°09′02″N 40°51′54″E
- Country: Turkey
- Province: Rize
- District: Pazar
- Elevation: 252 m (827 ft)
- Population (2021): 278
- Time zone: UTC+3 (TRT)

Aktaş is a village in the Pazar District, Rize Province, in Black Sea Region of Turkey. Its population is 278 (2021).

== History ==
According to list of villages in Laz language book (2009), name of the village is Xonari, which means "water that flows noisily". Most villagers are ethnically Laz. The old name of Aktas village is known as Hunari (ხუნარი)[3] This place name entered Turkish as Hunar. As a matter of fact, it is mentioned as Hunar (خونار) in the Trabzon province salnament dated 1876 and in the Ottoman village list dated 1928.

The Lazeti region, where the village of Hunari or Hunar is located, was part of the Kingdom of Kolkheti in ancient times. The Ottomans conquered this region after they abolished the Empire of Trabzon in 1461. According to the Trabzon vilayeti salnames of 1876, this settlement belonged to the Athens kaza of the Lazistan sanjak of Trabzon Vilayeti. Its population consisted of 48 people living in 17 households. It is possible that this number is only the male population. The village had 33 goats, 29 cows and 6 oxen as taxable livestock.

The village of Hunari or Hunar was under Russian rule during the First World War. Georgian linguist Ioseb Kipshidze, during his research trip to the Lazistan region in 1917, wrote that 284 people lived in 43 households in the village, which he noted as Hunar (ხუნარ).

== Geography ==
The village is located 7 kilometres (4.3 mi) away from Pazar.
