= Governor of Rize =

Governor of a Turkish Province

Governor of Rize Rize Valiliği
- Logo of the Governor of Rize
- Incumbent; İhsan Selim Baydaş since August 10, 2023
- Appointer: President of Turkey; On the recommendation of the Turkish government
- Term length: No set term length or limit
- Inaugural holder: Mehmet Hürşit; 1926
- Website: Office of the Governor

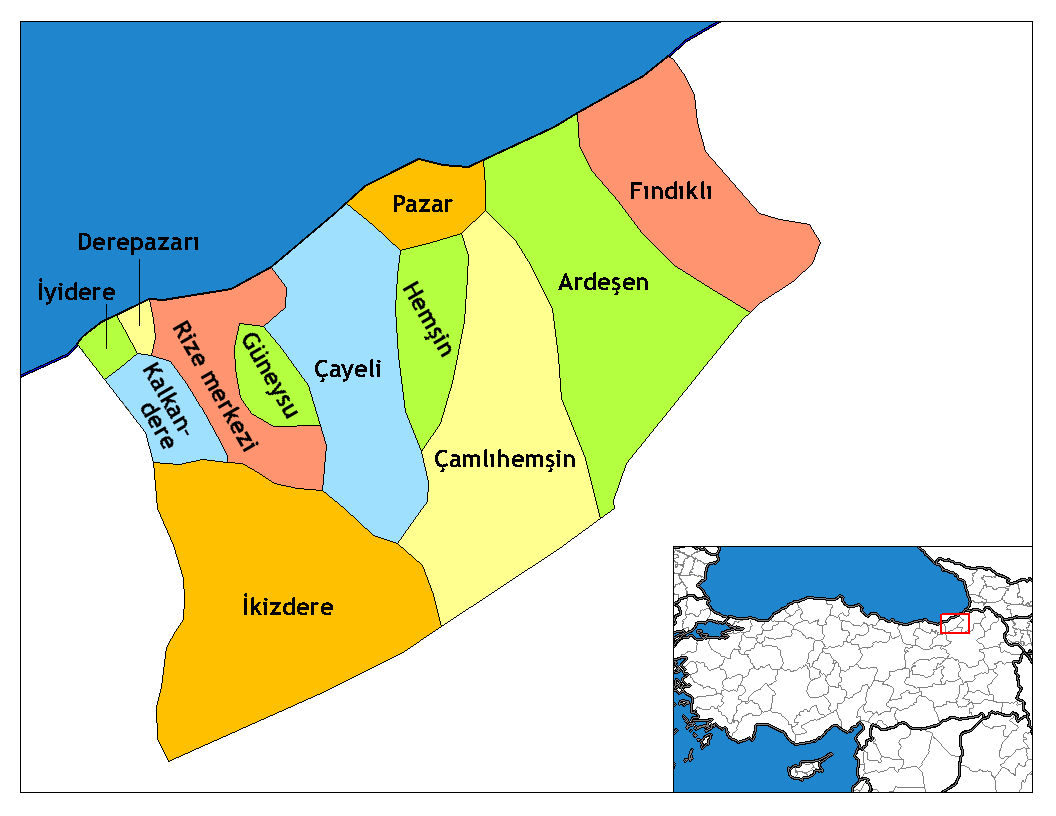
Map of the Province of Rize, showing the provincial districts.

The Governor of Rize (Turkish: Rize Valiliği) is the bureaucratic state official responsible for both national government and state affairs in the Province of Rize. Similar to the Governors of the 80 other Provinces of Turkey, the Governor of Rize is appointed by the Government of Turkey and is responsible for the implementation of government legislation within Rize. The Governor is also the most senior commander of both the Rize provincial police force and the Rize Gendarmerie.

== Appointment ==
The Governor of Rize is appointed by the President of Turkey, who confirms the appointment after recommendation from the Turkish Government. The Ministry of the Interior first considers and puts forward possible candidates for approval by the cabinet. The Governor of Rize is therefore not a directly elected position and instead functions as the most senior civil servant in the province of Rize.

=== Term limits ===
The Governor is not limited by any term limits and does not serve for a set length of time. Instead, the Governor serves at the pleasure of the Government, which can appoint or reposition the Governor whenever it sees fit. Such decisions are again made by the cabinet of Turkey. The Governor of Rize, as a civil servant, may not have any close connections or prior experience in Rize Province. It is not unusual for Governors to alternate between several different Provinces during their bureaucratic career.

== Functions ==
The Governor of Rize has both bureaucratic functions and influence over local government. The main role of the Governor is to oversee the implementation of decisions by government ministries, constitutional requirements and legislation passed by Grand National Assembly within the provincial borders. The Governor also has the power to reassign, remove or appoint officials a certain number of public offices and has the right to alter the role of certain public institutions if they see fit. Governors are also the most senior public official within the Province, meaning that they preside over any public ceremonies or provincial celebrations being held due to a national holiday. As the commander of the provincial police and Gendarmerie forces, the Governor can also take decisions designed to limit civil disobedience and preserve public order. Although mayors of municipalities and councillors are elected during local elections, the Governor has the right to re-organise or to inspect the proceedings of local government despite being an unelected position.

== List of governors of Rize ==
- Ahmet Esat Uras (1922–1924)
- Mehmet Hurşit Akkaya (1924–1926)
- Mehmet Eşref Sayit (1926–1927)
- Mehmet Cemil Bey (1927–1929)
- Mehmet Arif Bey (1929–1930)
- Ahmet Ekrem Engür (1930–1935)
- Ahmet Cevdet Ertuğrul (1935–1937)
- Nuri Türkkan (1937–1939)
- Derviş Hüsnü Uzgören (1939–1941)
- Ahmet Baha Beyoğlu (1941–1942)
- Saim Hazar (1942–1945)
- Nuh Cenap Aksu (1945–1946)
- Akif İşcan (1946–1947)
- Cavit Ünver (1947–1949)
- Hıfzı Tüz (1949–1950)
- Nazım Üner (1950–1954)
- İsmail Hakkı Ülken (1954–1958)
- Ertuğrul Ünlüer (1958–1960)
- Adil Aktan (1960–1964)
- Fikret Ersanlı (1964–1965)
- Mehmet Hamdi Ergün (1965–1967)
- Nezihi Okuş (1967–1970)
- Nüzhet Erman (1970–1971)
- Ahmet Nazif Demiröz (1971–1975)
- Kemal Kalender (1975–1978)
- Erol Uğurlu (1978–1979)
- Erol Zihni Gürsoy (1979–1980)
- Fikret Ersanlı (1980–1984)
- Erol Çakır (1984–1988)
- Ömer Büyükkent (1988–1992)
- Erol Çakır (1992–1993)
- Erdal Ata (1993–1996)
- Bülent Karaçöl (1996–2001)
- Enver Salihoğlu (2001–2006)
- Kasım Esen (2006–2008)
- Zekeriya Şarbak (2008–2009)
- Seyfullah Hacımüftüoğlu (2009–2012)
- Nurullah Çakır (2012–2014)
- Ersin Yazıcı (2014–2016)
- Erdoğan Bektaş (2016–2018)
- Kemal Çeber (2018–2023)
- İhsan Selim Baydaş (2023–)

== See also ==
- Governor (Turkey)
- Rize Province
- Ministry of the Interior (Turkey)
