= Aktepe, Pazar =

Aktepe Kitati (Laz language)
- Village
- Location in Turkey
- Coordinates: 41.1430°N 40.8736°E
- Country: Turkey
- Province: Rize
- District: Pazar
- Elevation: 252 m (827 ft)
- Population (2021): 164
- Time zone: UTC+3 (TRT)

Aktepe is a village in the Pazar District, Rize Province, in Black Sea Region of Turkey. Its population is 164 (2021).

== History ==
According to list of villages in Laz language book (2009), name of the village is Kitati or Chitati, which means "Kito homeland". Most villagers are ethnically Laz.

== Geography ==
The village is located 5 kilometres (3.1 mi) away from Pazar.
