= Dağdibi, Pazar =

Dağdibi Sulet (Laz language)
- Village
- Location in Turkey
- Coordinates: 41.1193°N 40.8590°E
- Country: Turkey
- Province: Rize
- District: Pazar
- Elevation: 508 m (1,667 ft)
- Population (2021): 134
- Time zone: UTC+3 (TRT)

Dağdibi is a village in the Pazar District, Rize Province, in Black Sea Region of Turkey. Its population is 134 (2021).

== History ==
According to list of villages in Laz language book (2009), name of the village is Sulet, which means "with flax". Most villagers are ethnically Laz.

== Geography ==
The village is located 10 kilometres (6.2 mi) away from Pazar.
