= Elmalık, Pazar =

Elmalık
- Village
- Location in Turkey
- Coordinates: 41.1151°N 40.8915°E
- Country: Turkey
- Province: Rize
- District: Pazar
- Elevation: 252 m (827 ft)
- Population (2021): 331
- Time zone: UTC+3 (TRT)

Elmalık is a village in the Pazar District, Rize Province, in Black Sea Region of Turkey. Its population is 331 (2021).
