= Balıkçı, Pazar =

Balıkçı Zelek
- Village
- Location in Turkey
- Coordinates: 41°9′21″N 40°48′8″E
- Country: Turkey
- Province: Rize
- District: Pazar
- Elevation: 252 m (827 ft)
- Population (2021): 293
- Time zone: UTC+3 (TRT)

Balıkçı is a village in the Pazar District, Rize Province, in Black Sea Region of Turkey. Its population is 293 (2021).

== History ==
As of 1928, the name of the village was Zelek. Most villagers are ethnically Laz.

== Geography ==
The village is located 7 kilometres (4.3 mi) away from Pazar.
