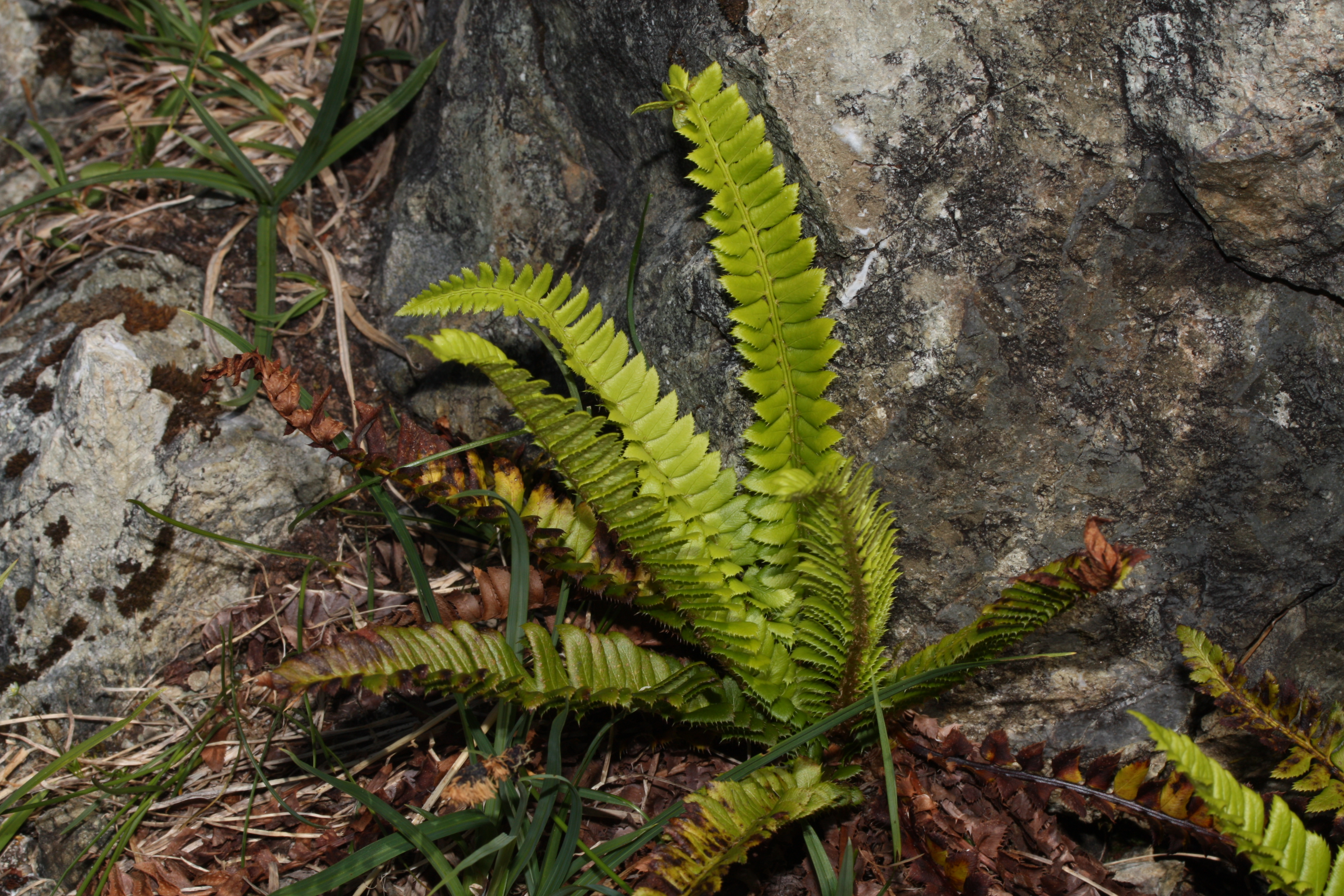

Conservation status
- Secure (NatureServe)

Scientific classification
- Kingdom: Plantae
- Clade: Tracheophytes
- Division: Polypodiophyta
- Class: Polypodiopsida
- Order: Polypodiales
- Suborder: Polypodiineae
- Family: Dryopteridaceae
- Genus: Polystichum
- Species: P. lonchitis

Binomial name
- Polystichum lonchitis (L.) Roth
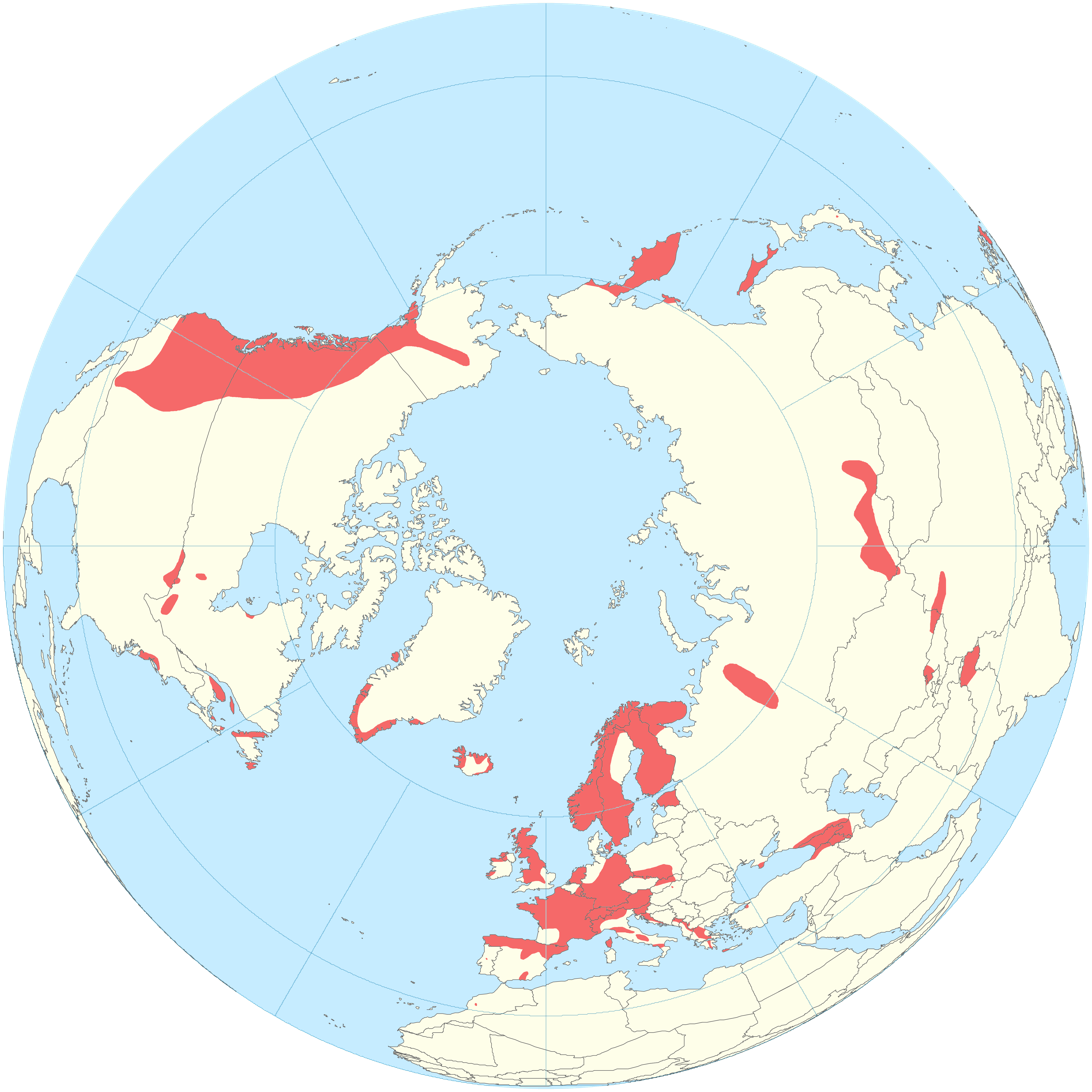

= Polystichum lonchitis =

Species of fern

Polystichum lonchitis is a species of fern known by the common name northern hollyfern, or simply holly-fern. It is native to much of the Northern Hemisphere from Eurasia to Alaska to Greenland and south into mountainous central North America. It has stiff, glossy green, erect fronds and grows in moist, shady, rocky mountain habitats.

== Description ==
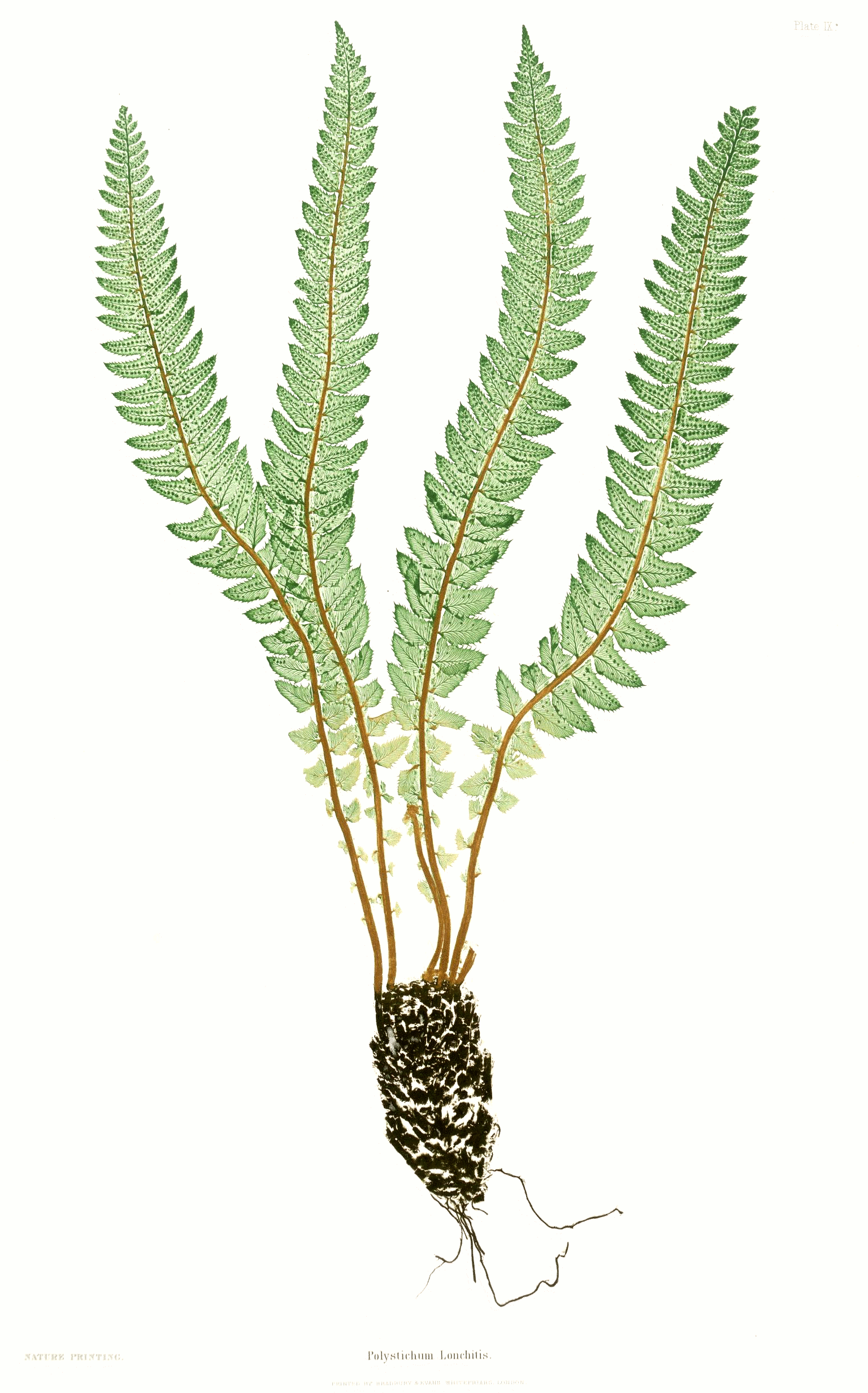
A nature print

This tufted fern produces several erect, linear fronds up to 60 centimetres (24 in) long. In shadier locations fronds may be held horizontally. The fronds are glossy and stiff, pinnate, with many lance-shaped to oblong pinnae (leaflets) up to 3 or 4 centimetres (1.2 or 1.6 in) long, the longest ones occurring near the midpoint of the frond, the basal ones being smaller and triangular in shape. The pinnae overlap each other slightly and are toothed with prominent outward-pointing spines on the margins. The sori are rounded, with a whitish to gray covering (indusium), and are arranged in two rows on the underside of the pinnae. This is a slow-growing, long-lived plant.

== Distribution and habitat ==
Holly fern is an arctic-alpine species with a circumpolar boreal and montane distribution in the Northern Hemisphere. It grows best in calcareous soil in cool, damp locations at the base of cliffs, on rock ledges and crevices, and among boulders and in deep cavities in limestone pavements. It also grows on other types of rocks as long as they are not calcium deficient. In the British Isles it occurs in Scotland and the western fringes of England, Wales and Ireland, and at scattered locations elsewhere. It occurs at a single location in Northern Ireland, at Lough Navar Forest Park in County Fermanagh, and because of its rarity there, it is listed as a Northern Ireland Priority Species.

== Gallery ==
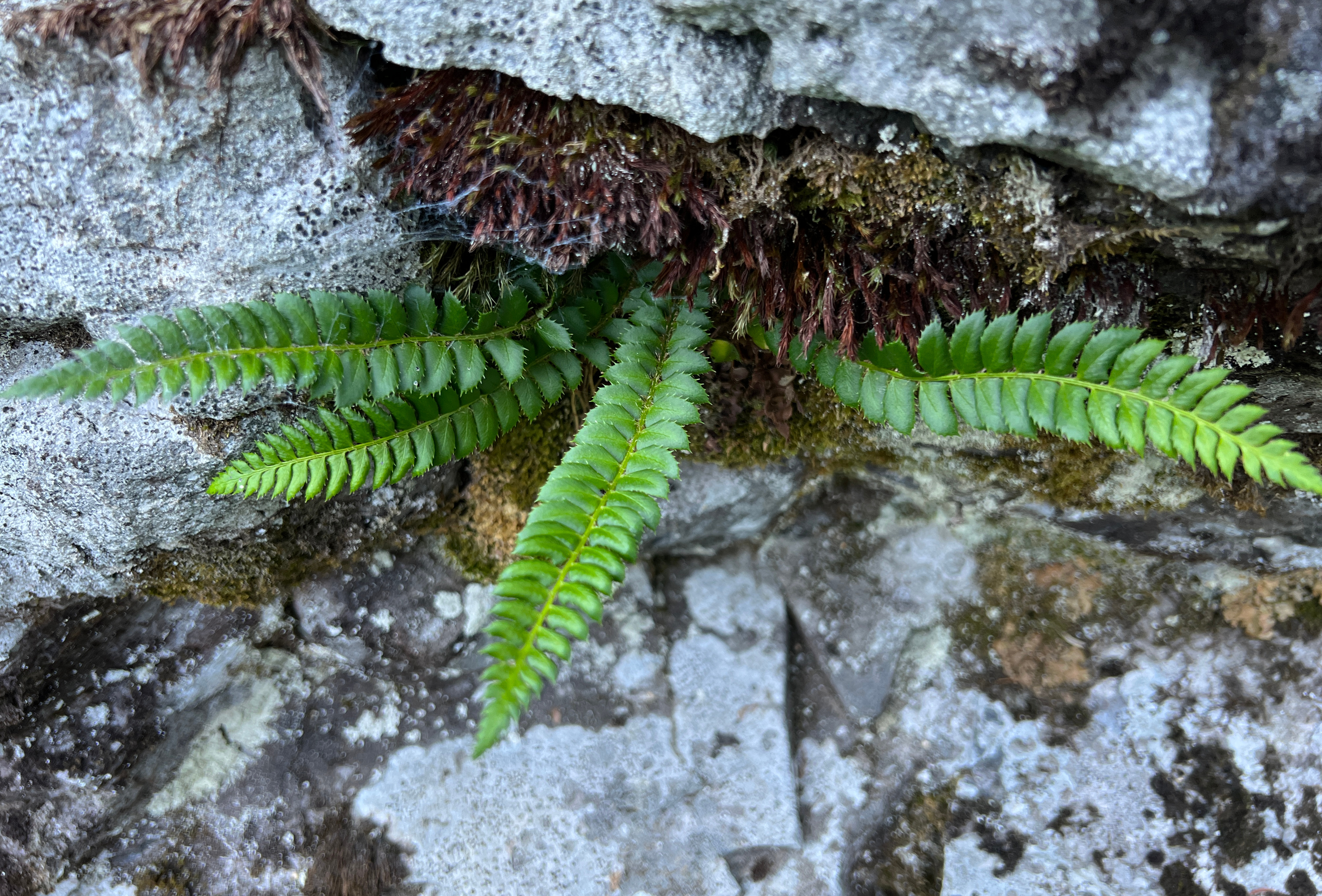
Growing near Snoqualmie Pass

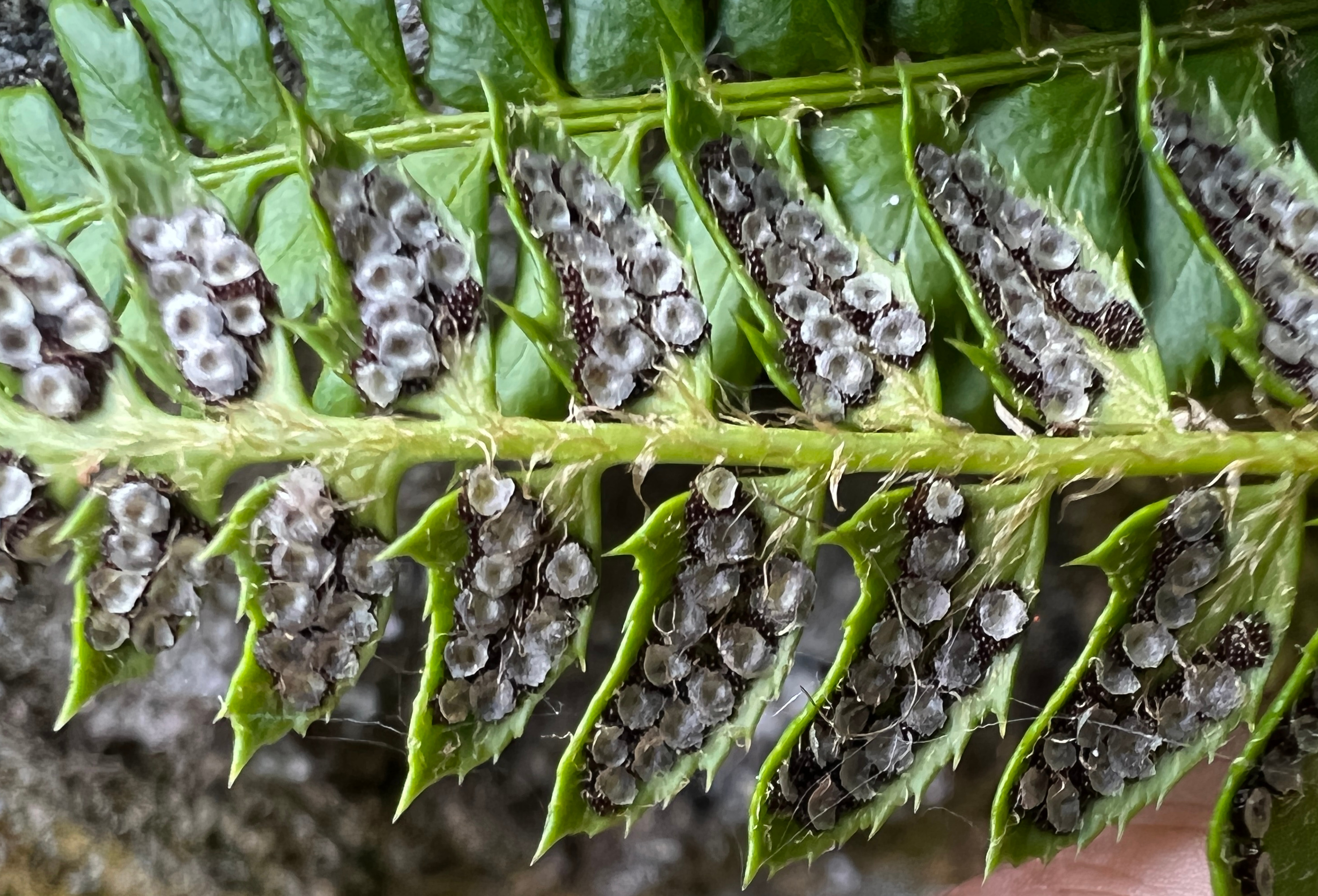
Abaxial (lower) leaf surface with sori
