= Melyat =

River in Pazar, Rize, Turkey

Coordinates: 41°09′25″N 40°47′46″E

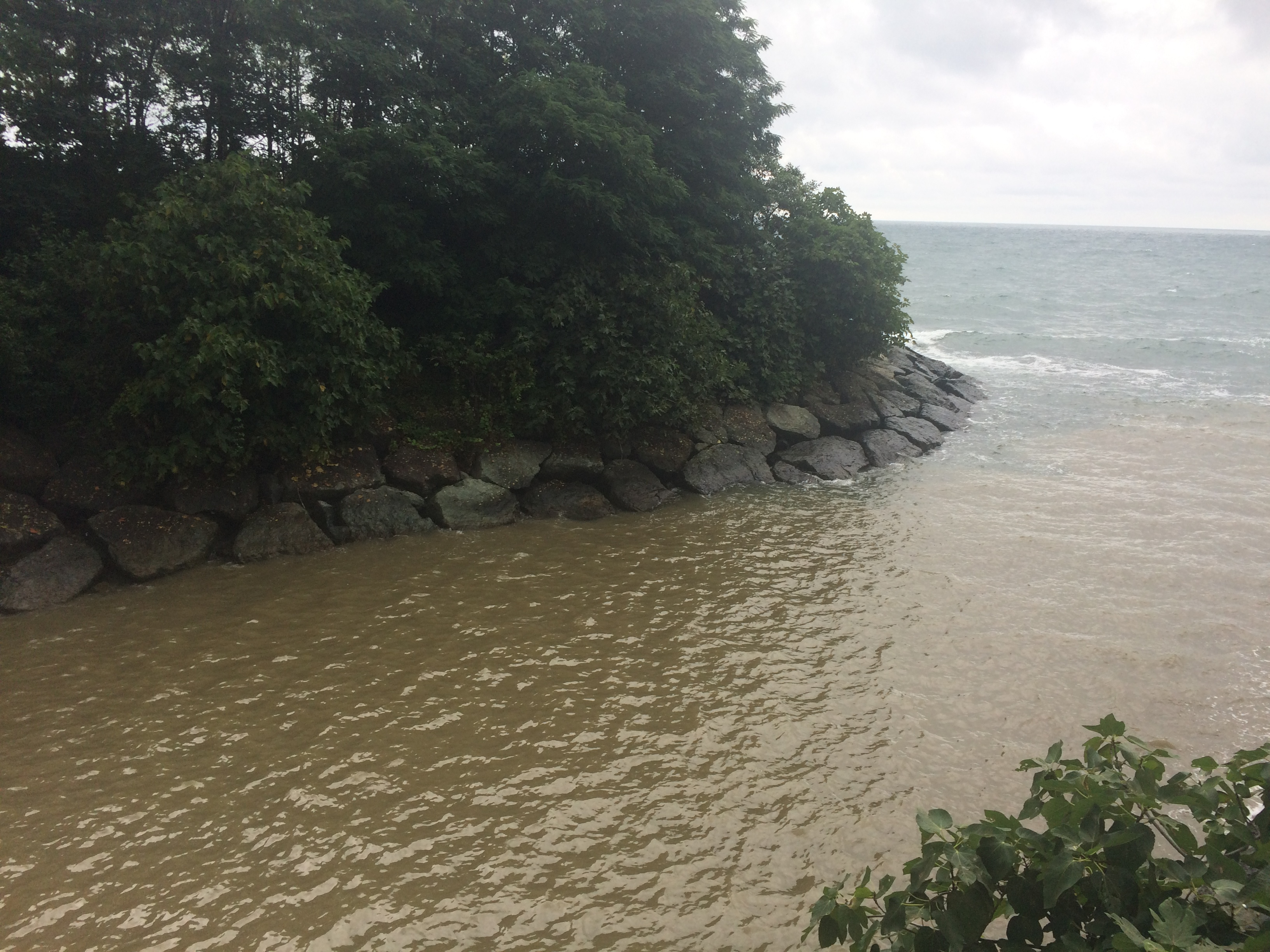
Melyat, Pazar, Rize

Melyat, is one of the main water streams of Pazar and Çayeli in the eastern Black Sea Region of Turkey. Melyat is 20.3 kilometres (12.6 mi) long. It is 28 km from the city center of Rize. The source of the river is Cegalver Mountain in Hemşin district. River borders the villages of Zafer, Yavuzlar, Erenler, Çınartepe, Kaçkar, Kestanelik, Tektaş, Güneyköy, Şendere, Kuzayca, Örnek, Merdivenli, Leventköy and Balıkçı respectively.

== Fauna ==
Fish species living in the river are Salmo coruhensis, Alburnus derjugini, Barbus escherichii, Squalius sp., Mugil cephalus, Liza aurata and Ponticola rizensis.
