= Pazar District, Rize =

District of Rize Province, Turkey

Pazar District
- District
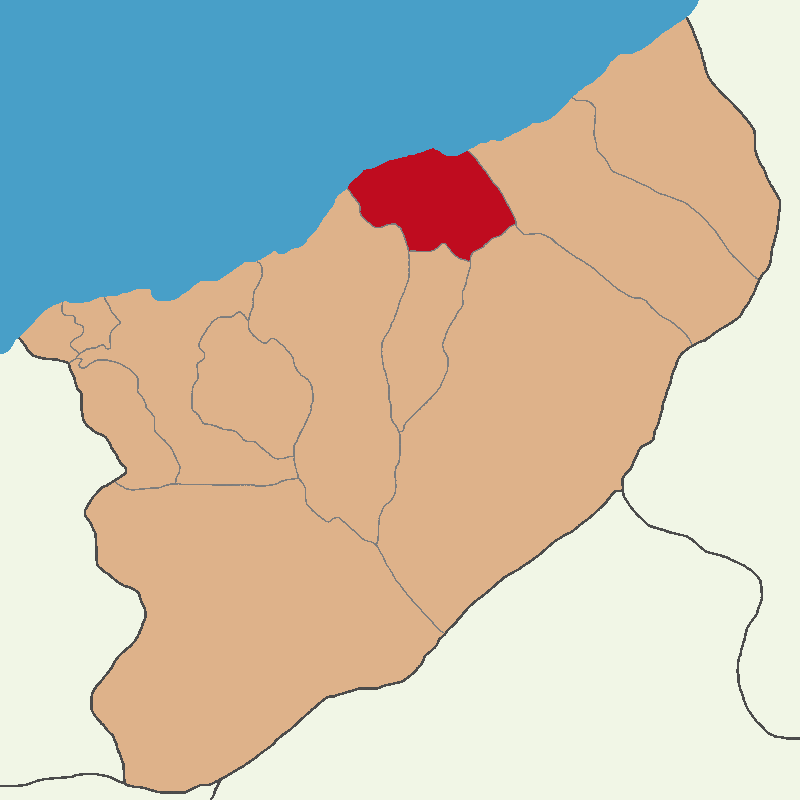
- Map showing Pazar District in Rize Province

- Location in Turkey
- Coordinates: 41°10′N 40°53′E
- Country: Turkey
- Province: Rize
- Seat: Pazar

Government
  - Kaymakam: Mustafa Akın
- Area: 173 km^{2} (67 sq mi)
- Population (2021): 31,678
  - Density: 180/km^{2} (470/sq mi)
- Time zone: UTC+3 (TRT)
- Website: www.pazar.gov.tr

Pazar District is a district of the Rize Province of Turkey. Its seat is the town of Pazar. Its area is 173 km^{2}, and its population is 31,678 (2021).

== Composition ==
There is one municipality in Pazar District:

- Pazar

There are 48 villages in Pazar District:

- Akbucak
- Akmescit
- Aktaş
- Aktepe
- Alçılı
- Balıkçı
- Başköy
- Boğazlı
- Bucak
- Dağdibi
- Darılı
- Derebaşı
- Derinsu
- Dernek
- Elmalık
- Güneyköy
- Hamidiye
- Handağı
- Hasköy
- Hisarlı
- Irmakköy
- Irmakyeniköy
- Kayağantaş
- Kesikköprü
- Kuzayca
- Merdivenli
- Örnek
- Ortaırmak
- Ortayol
- Papatya
- Sahilköy
- Şehitlik
- Şendere
- Şentepe
- Sessizdere
- Sivrikale
- Sivritepe
- Subaşı
- Suçatı
- Sulak
- Tektaş
- Topluca
- Tütüncüler
- Uğrak
- Yavuzköy
- Yemişli
- Yeşilköy
- Yücehisar
