= Laz language =

Kartvelian language of Turkey and Georgia

Laz
- Lazuri ლაზური Lazuri nena ლაზური ნენა
- Native to: Turkey; Georgia
- Ethnicity: Laz
- Native speakers: 22,000 (2007)
- Language family: Kartvelian: Karto-Zan; Zan; Laz
- Writing system: In Turkey: Latin script; In Georgia: Georgian script

Language codes
- ISO 639-3: lzz
- Glottolog: lazz1240
- ELP: Laz
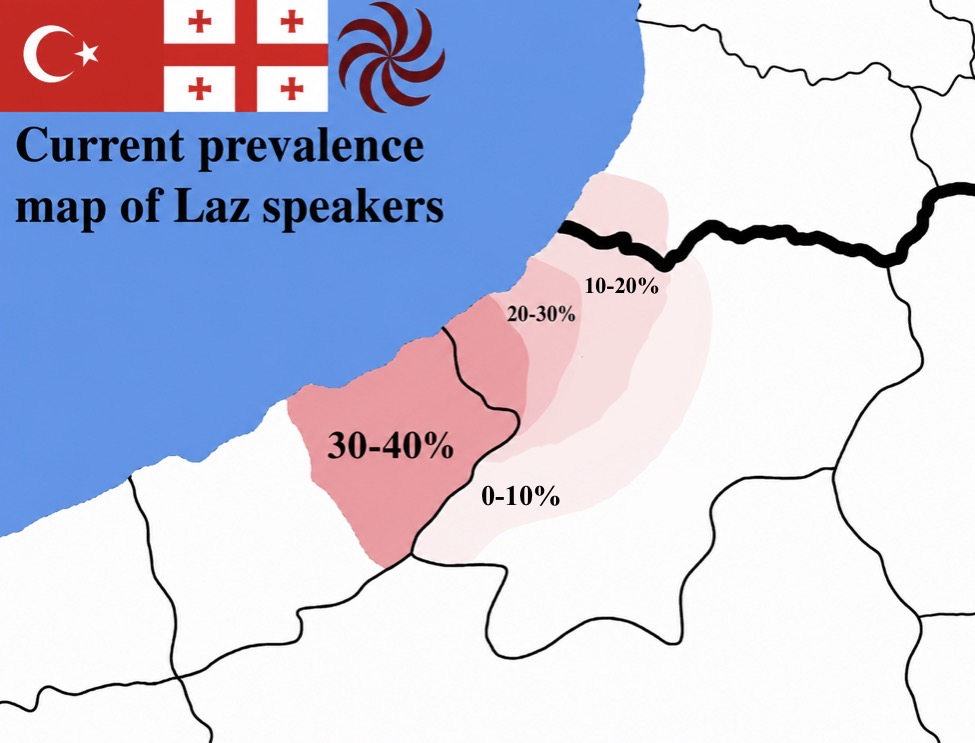
- Current prevalence map of Laz speakers

- Laz is classified as Definitely Endangered by the UNESCO Atlas of the World's Languages in Danger.

Soner speaking Laz

The Laz or Lazuri language (Laz: ლაზური ნენა, romanized: lazuri nena) is a Kartvelian language spoken by the Laz people on the southeastern shore of the Black Sea. In 2007, it was estimated that there were around 20,000 native speakers in Turkey, in a strip of land extending from Melyat to the Georgian border (officially called Lazistan until 1925), and around 1,000 native speakers around Adjara in Georgia. There are also around 1,000 native speakers of Laz in Germany.

Laz is not historically a written language or literary language. In 1989, Benninghaus wrote that the Laz themselves had no interest in writing in Laz.

== Classification ==
Laz is one of the four Kartvelian languages also known as South Caucasian languages. Along with Mingrelian, it forms the Zan branch of this Kartvelian language family. The two languages are very closely related, to the extent that some linguists refer to Mingrelian and Laz as dialects or regional variants of a single Zan language, a view held officially in the Soviet era and still so in Georgia today. In general, however, Mingrelian and Laz are considered as separate languages, due both to the long-standing separation of their communities of speakers (500 years) and to a lack of mutual intelligibility.

== History ==
Although the Laz people are recorded in written sources repeatedly from antiquity onwards, the earliest written evidence of their language is from 1787. There is a poem in Evliya Çelebi's Seyahatnâme (17th century) that has been interpreted as Laz, but it is more likely to represent Pontic Greek. The first definite record of Laz in 1787 was produced by the Spanish Jesuit linguist Lorenzo Hervás. It was largely ignored because Hervás conflated the name of the language with that of the Lezgian language, calling it lingua Lasga, detta ancora Laza, e Lassa. In 1823, Julius Heinrich von Klaproth published a list of 67 Laz words with German translations in his Asia Polyglotta. He identified three dialects. In 1844, Georg Rosen published in German the first monograph on Laz, Über die Sprache der Lazen. In 1887, the British diplomat Demetrius Rudolph Peacock included Laz among five languages of the western Caucasus in a paper designed for the use of English-speaking diplomats.

=== Statistics in Turkey (1935–2007) ===
Year	Laz speakers	%	notes
1935	63,253 (first language) 5,061 (second language)	0.42%	Census
1945	39,232 (first language) 4,956 (second language)	0.24%	Census
1950	70,423 (total)	0.34%	Census
1955	30,566 (first language) 19,144 (second language)	0.21%	Census
1960	21,703 (first language) 38,275 (second language)	0.22%	Census
1965	26,007 (first language) 55,158 (second language)	0.26%	Census
1980	30,000 (first language)	0.07%	Estimate
2007	20,000 (total)	0.03%	Estimate

== Geographical distribution ==
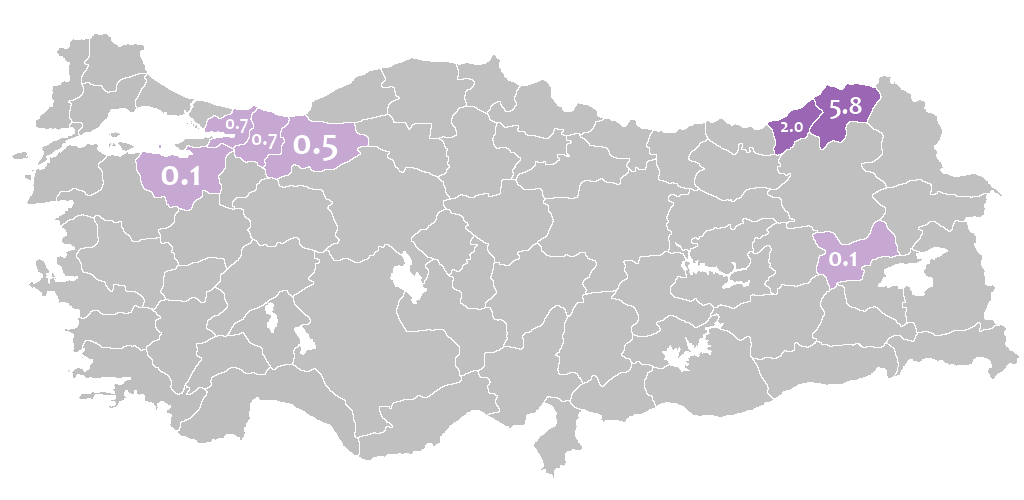
Laz-speaking population in Turkey according to the 1965 census

The Georgian language, along with its relatives Mingrelian, Laz, and Svan, comprise the Kartvelian language family. The initial breakup of Proto-Kartvelian is estimated to have been around 2500–2000 BC, with the divergence of Svan from Proto-Kartvelian (Nichols, 1998). Assyrian, Urartian, Greek, and Roman documents reveal that in early historical times (2nd–1st millennia BC), the numerous Kartvelian tribes were in the process of migrating into the Caucasus from the southwest. The northern coast and coastal mountains of Asia Minor were dominated by Kartvelian peoples at least as far west as Samsun. Their eastward migration may have been set in motion by the fall of Troy (dated by Eratosthenes to 1183 BC). It thus appears that the Kartvelians represent an intrusion into the Georgian plain from northeastern Anatolia, displacing their predecessors, the unrelated Northwest Caucasian and Vainakh peoples, into the Caucasian highlands (Tuite, 1996; Nichols, 2004).

The oldest known settlement of the Lazoi is the town of Lazos or "old Lazik", which Arrian places 680 stadia (about 80 miles) south of the Sacred Port, Novorossiisk, and 1,020 stadia (100 miles) north of Pityus, i.e., somewhere in the neighborhood of Tuapse. Kiessling sees in the Lazoi a section of the Kerketai, who in the first century AD had to migrate southwards under pressure from the Zygoi. The same author regards the Kerketai as a "Georgian" tribe. The fact is that at the time of Arrian (2nd century AD), the Lazoi were already living to the south of Um. The order of the peoples living along the coast to the east of Trebizond was as follows: Colchi (and Sanni); Machelones; Heniochi; Zydritae; Lazai, subjects of King Malassus, who owned the suzerainty of Rome; Apsilae; Abacsi; and Sanigae near Sebastopolis.

=== Social and cultural status ===
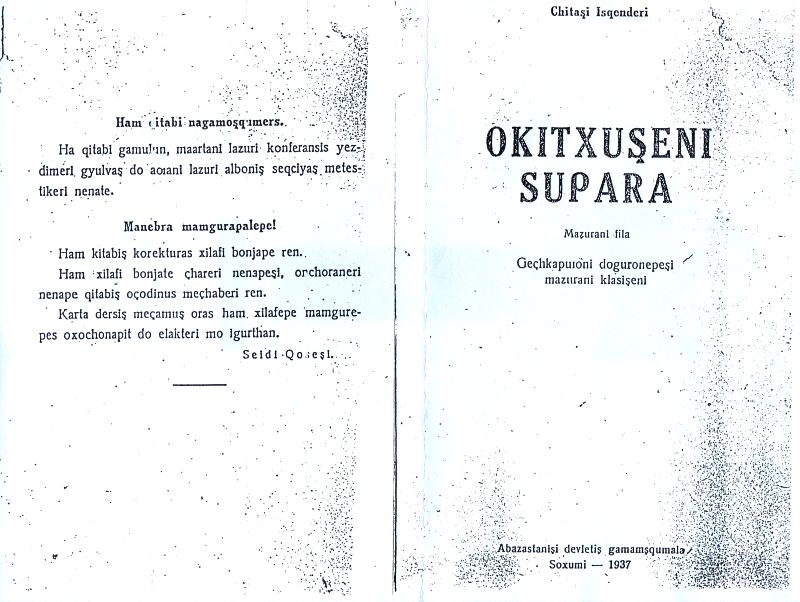
A Laz book

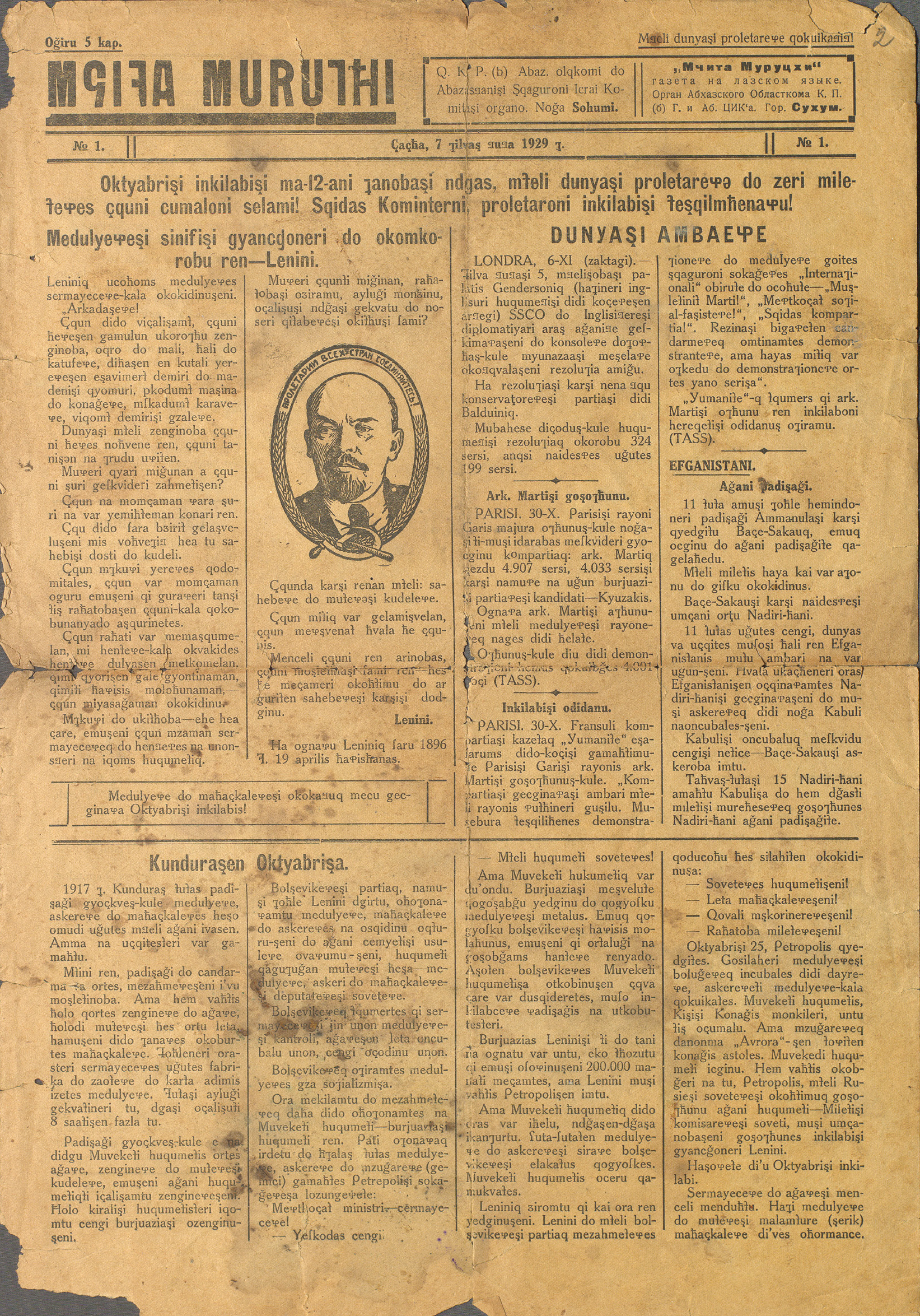
A Laz newspaper in 1929

Laz has no official status in either Turkey or Georgia, and no written standard. It is presently used only for familiar and casual interaction; for literary, business, and other purposes, Laz speakers use their country's official language (Turkish or Georgian).

Laz is unique among the Kartvelian languages in that most of its speakers live in Turkey rather than Georgia. While the differences between the various dialects are minor, their speakers feel that their level of mutual intelligibility is low. Given that there is no common standard form of Laz, speakers of its different dialects use Turkish to communicate with each other.

Between 1930 and 1938, Zan (Laz and Mingrelian) enjoyed cultural autonomy in Georgia and was used as a literary language, but an official standard form of the language was never established. Since then, all attempts to create a written tradition in Zan have failed, despite the fact that most intellectuals use it as a literary language.

In Turkey, Laz has been a written language since 1984, when a script based on the Turkish alphabet was created. Since then, this system has been used in most of the handful of publications that have appeared in Laz. Developed specifically for the Kartvelian languages, the Georgian alphabet is better suited to the sounds of Laz, but the fact that most of the language's speakers live in Turkey, where the Latin alphabet is used, has rendered the adoption of the former impossible. Nonetheless, 1991 saw the publication of a textbook called Nana-nena ('Mother tongue'), which was aimed at all Laz speakers and used both the Latin and Georgian alphabets. The first Laz–Turkish dictionary was published in 1999.

Speaking Laz was forbidden in Turkey between 1980 and 1991, because doing so was seen as a political threat to the unity of the country. During this era, some academicians lamented the existence of the Laz ethnic group. Because speaking Laz was banned in public areas, many children lost their mother tongue as a result of not communicating with their parents. Most Laz people have a heavy Turkish accent because they cannot practice their mother tongue.

== Phonology ==
Like many languages of the Caucasus, Laz has a rich consonantal system but only five vowels (a, e, i, o, u).

		Labial	Alveolar	Palatal	Velar	Uvular	Glottal
Stop	plain	p	t		k		
Stop	voiced	b	d		ɡ		
Stop	ejective	pʼ	tʼ		kʼ	qʼ	
Affricate	plain		t͡s	t͡ʃ			
Affricate	voiced		d͡z	d͡ʒ			
Affricate	ejective		t͡sʼ	t͡ʃʼ			
Fricative	plain	f	s	ʃ	x		h
Fricative	voiced	v	z	ʒ	ɣ		
Nasal		m	n				
Approximant			l	j			
Trill			r				

	Front	Back
Close	i	u
Mid	ɛ	ɔ
Open	ɑ	

== Writing system ==
Laz is written in Mkhedruli script and in an extension of the Turkish alphabet. For the Laz letters written in the Latin script, the first is a letter from the writing system introduced in Turkey in 1984 that was developed by Fahri Lazoğlu and Wolfgang Feurstein and the second is the transcription system used by Caucasianists.

Latin (Used in Turkey)		Mkhedruli (Used in Georgia)	Transliteration of Mkhedruli	IPA
A a		ა	a	/ɑ/
B b		ბ	b	/b/
C c	J̌ ǰ	ჯ	j	/d͡ʒ/
Ç ç	Č č	ჩ	ch	/t͡ʃ/
Ç̌ ç̌	Čʼ čʼ	ჭ	chʼ	/t͡ʃʼ/
D d		დ	d	/d/
E e		ე	e	/ɛ/
F f		ჶ	f	/f/
G g		გ	g	/ɡ/
Ğ ğ		ღ	gh	/ɣ/
H h		ჰ	h	/h/
I i		ი	i	/i/
J j		ჟ	zh	/ʒ/
K k		ქ	k	/k/
Ǩ ǩ	Kʼ kʼ	კ	kʼ	/kʼ/
L l		ლ	l	/l/
M m		მ	m	/m/
N n		ნ	n	/n/
O o		ო	o	/ɔ/
P p		ფ	p	/p/
P̌ p̌	Pʼ pʼ	პ	pʼ	/pʼ/
Q q		ყ	qʼ	/qʼ/
R r		რ	r	/r/
S s		ს	s	/s/
Ş ş	Š š	შ	sh	/ʃ/
T t		თ	t	/t/
Ť t͏̌	Tʼ tʼ	ტ	tʼ	/tʼ/
U u		უ	u	/u/
V v		ვ	v	/v/
X x		ხ	kh	/x/
Y y		ჲ	y	/j/
Z z		ზ	z	/z/
Ž ž	Ż ż	ძ	dz	/d͡z/
Ʒ ʒ	C c	ც	ts	/t͡s/
Ǯ ǯ	Cʼ cʼ	წ	tsʼ	/t͡sʼ/

== Grammar ==
The nouns are inflected with agglutinative suffixes to indicate grammatical function (four to eight cases, depending on the dialect) and number (singular or plural), but not by gender. The Laz verb is inflected with suffixes according to person and number, and also for grammatical tense, aspect, mood, and (in some dialects) evidentiality. Up to 50 verbal prefixes are used to indicate spatial orientation/direction. Person and number suffixes provided for the subject as well as for one or two objects involved in the action, e.g. gimpulam = "I hide it from you".

Some distinctive features of Laz among its family are:

- All nouns end with a vowel.
- More extensive verb inflection, using directional prefixes.
- Some lexical borrowings from Greek and Turkic languages.

== See also ==
- Colchis
- Laz people
- Lazistan Sanjak
- Lazistan
- Kaskian language

== Bibliography ==
- Anderson, Ralph Dewitt. (1963). A Grammar of Laz. Ann Arbor: UMI. (Doctoral dissertation, Austin: University of Texas at Austin; vi+127pp.)
- Grove, Timothy (2012). Materials for a Comprehensive History of the Caucasus, with an Emphasis on Greco-Roman Sources. A Star in the East: Materials for a Comprehensive History of the Caucasus, with an Emphasis on Greco-Roman sources (2012)
- Kojima, Gôichi (2003) Lazuri grameri Chiviyazıları, Kadıköy, İstanbul, ISBN 975-8663-55-0 (notes in English and Turkish)
- Nichols, Johanna (1998). The origin and dispersal of languages: Linguistic evidence. In N. G. Jablonski & L. C. Aiello (Eds.), The origin and diversification of language. San Francisco: California Academy of Sciences.
- Nichols, Johanna (2004). The origin of the Chechen and Ingush: A study in Alpine linguistic and ethnic geography. Anthropological Linguistics 46(2): 129–155.
- Özüm Ak, Zeynep (2018). Understanding the problems of the support of an endangered language in typography: Proposal of a typeface that supports the Laz language (PDF) (Thesis). Escola Superior de Arte e Design de Matosinhos. hdl:10400.26/22318. Archived from the original (PDF) on 8 December 2023.
- Tuite, Kevin. (1996). Highland Georgian paganism — archaism or innovation?: Review of Zurab K’ik’nadze. 1996. Kartuli mitologia, I. ǰvari da saq’mo. (Georgian mythology, I. The cross and his people [sic].). Annual of the Society for the Study of Caucasia 7: 79–91.
