= Rize Province =

Province of Turkey

Coordinates: 40°55′54″N 40°50′52″E

Rize Province Rize ili
- Province
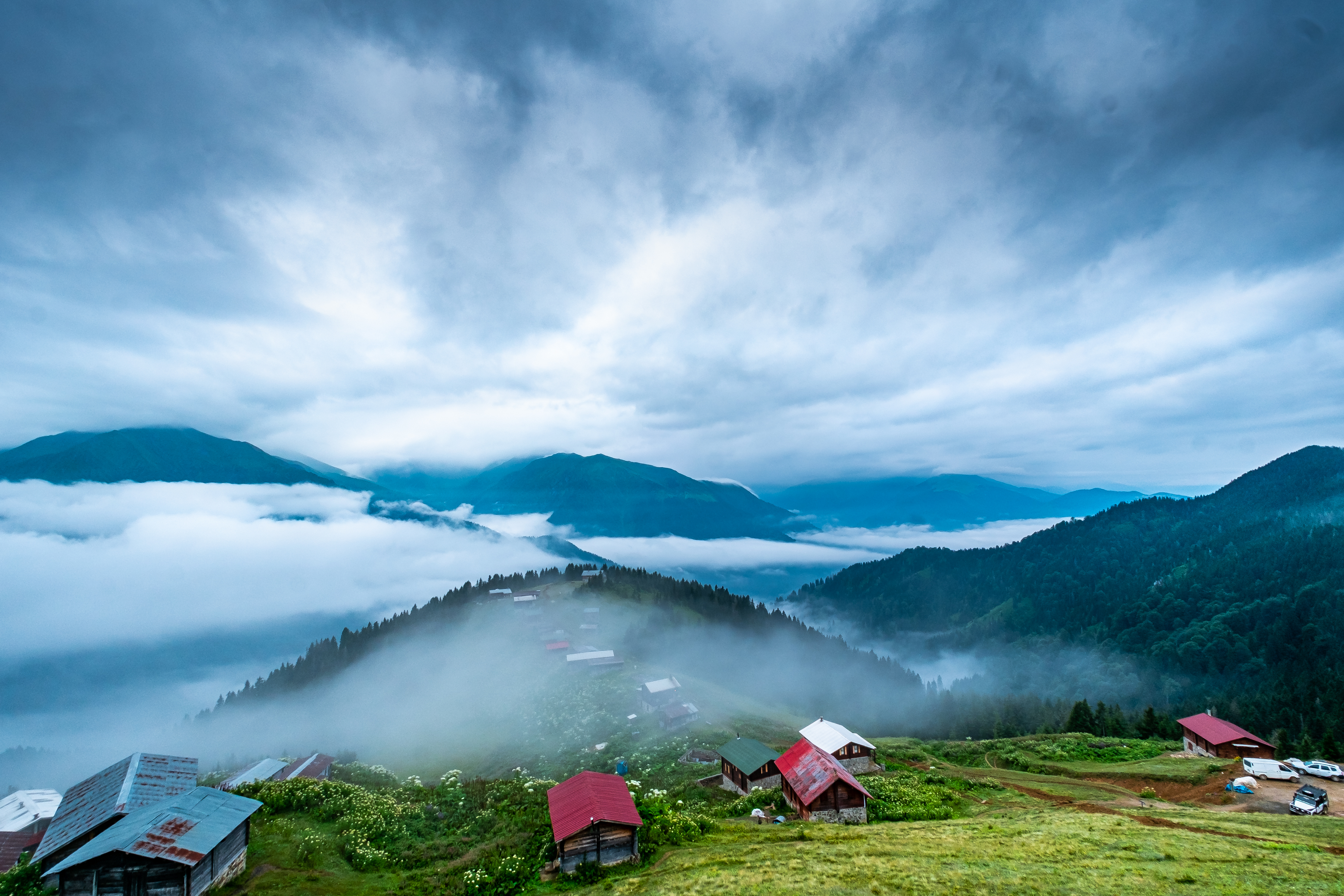
- Pokut Yayla in Rize

- Location of the province within Turkey
- Country: Turkey
- Seat: Rize

Government
  - Governor: İhsan Selim Baydaş
- Area: 3,835 km^{2} (1,481 sq mi)
- Population (2022): 344,016
  - Density: 89.70/km^{2} (232.3/sq mi)
- Time zone: UTC+3 (TRT)
- Area code: 0464
- Website: www.rize.gov.tr

Rize Province (Turkish: Rize ili) is a province of northeast Turkey, on the eastern Black Sea coast between Trabzon and Artvin. The province of Erzurum is to the south. Its area is 3,835 km^{2}, and its population is 344,016 (2022). The capital is the city of Rize. It was formerly known as Lazistan, however the designation of the term of Lazistan was officially banned in 1926.

The province is home to Turkish, Laz, Hemshin and Georgian communities.

== Etymology ==
The name comes from Greek ρίζα (riza), meaning "mountain slopes". The Georgian, Laz, and Armenian names respectively are Rize (რიზე), Rizini (რიზინი), and Rize (Ռիզե).

== History ==
=== Antiquity ===
The earliest known inhabitants of the Rize region were tribes of Asian origin who spoke agglutinative languages. The region first appears in written history in the 8th century BC, marking the beginning of its Historical Age. The Çoruh valleys and the Rize area are mentioned as “Kulki” or “Kulkha” in a cuneiform inscription commissioned by the Urartian king Sarduri II in 765 BC. This inscription was carved into a rock above Taşköprü Village, south of Lake Çıldır and north of Kars. Later Greek sources referred to the region’s people as the “Kolk” or “Kolditians.” This inscription remains the earliest known written reference to the region.

Following his victory over the Achaemenid king Darius III, Alexander the Great brought Anatolia under his control, a rule that lasted until his death in 323 BC. In the power struggles that followed, Mithridates I Ktistes proclaimed independence and established the Kingdom of Pontus, which gradually extended its influence along the Black Sea coast toward Sinop. In 180 BC, the Pontic king Pharnaces captured Rize and added it to the kingdom’s domain. The region later passed into Roman hands in AD 10, and after the Roman Empire was divided, Rize and its surrounding areas continued as part of the Byzantine Empire.

=== Medieval era ===
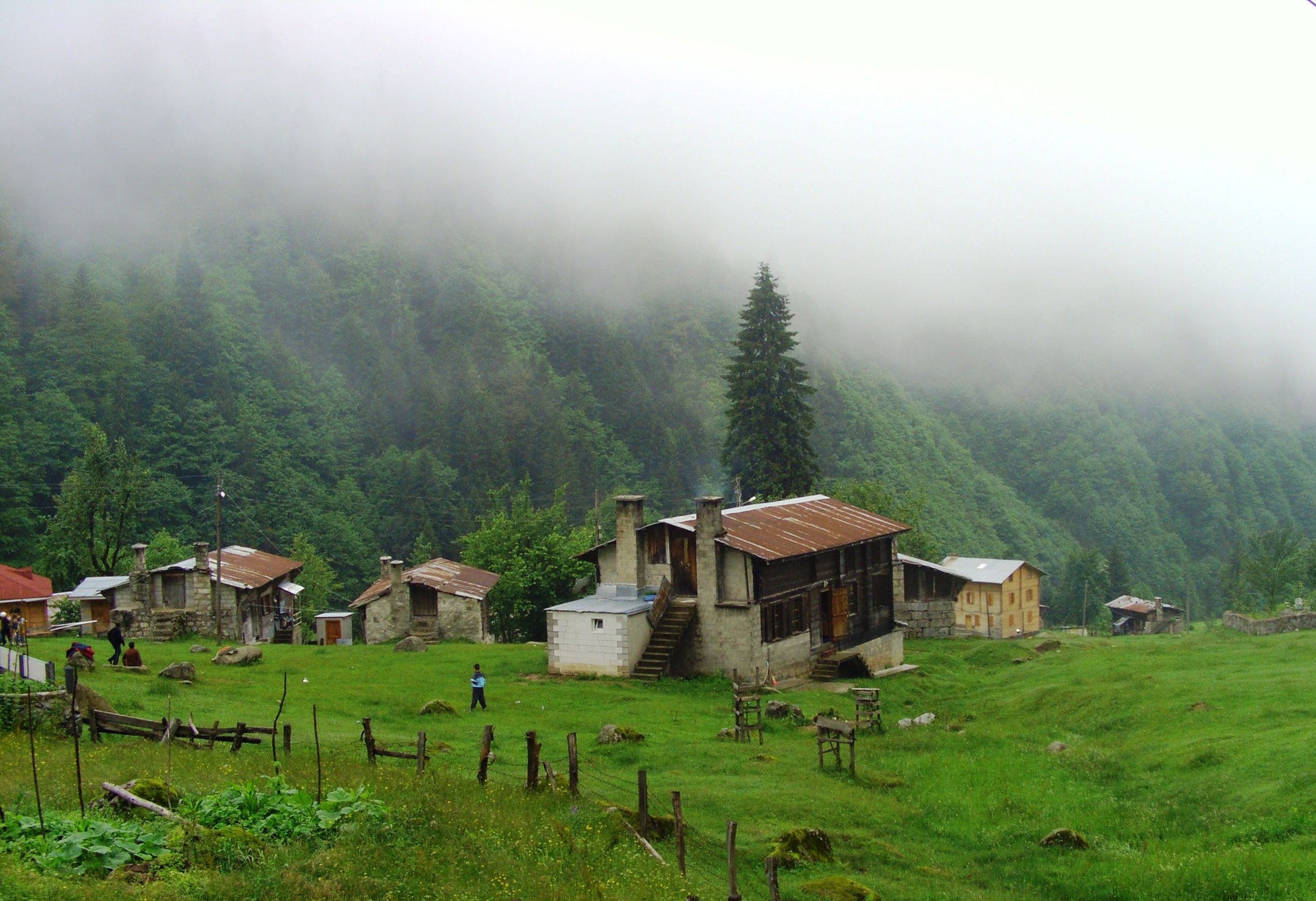
A view from Ayder plateau

During the medieval era, the region was under Byzantine control, and was mainly populated by Greeks and indigenous Lazs. During the reign of the Byzantine emperor Justinian I (c. 527–565), the tribes of the interior, called Sannoi or Tzannoi, the ancestors of modern Laz people, were subdued, Christianized and brought to central rule. Locals began to have closer contact with the Greeks and acquired various Hellenic cultural traits, including in some cases the language. Locals were under nominal Byzantine suzerainty in the theme of Chaldia, with its capital at Trebizond, governed by native semi-autonomous rulers, like the Gabras family. In 790 AD, Armenians fleeing from the Arab invasion of Armenia settled in Hemshin and established the Principality of Hamamshen. Following the invasion of the Seljuk Turks, there was a larger influx of Armenians in the area, resulting in partial Armenization of the local Tzan population.

With the Georgian intervention in Chaldia and collapse of Byzantine Empire in 1204, the Empire of Trebizond was established along the southeastern coast of the Black Sea, populated by a large Lazian-speaking population. In the eastern part of the same empire, an autonomous coastal theme of Greater Lazia was established. Byzantine authors, such as Pachymeres, and to some extent Trapezuntines such as Lazaropoulos and Bessarion, regarded the Trapezuntian Empire as being merely a Lazian border state. Though Greek in higher culture, the rural areas of Trebizond empire appear to have been predominantly Laz in ethnic composition. Laz family names, with hellenized terminations, are noticeable in the records of the mediaeval empire of Trebizond.

In 1282, the kingdom of Imereti besieged Trebizond, however after the failed attempt to take the city, the Georgians occupied several provinces, and the Trebizontine province of Lazia threw off its allegiance to the king of the 'Iberian' and 'Lazian' tribes and united itself with the Georgian Kingdom of Imereti.

=== The Ottoman era ===
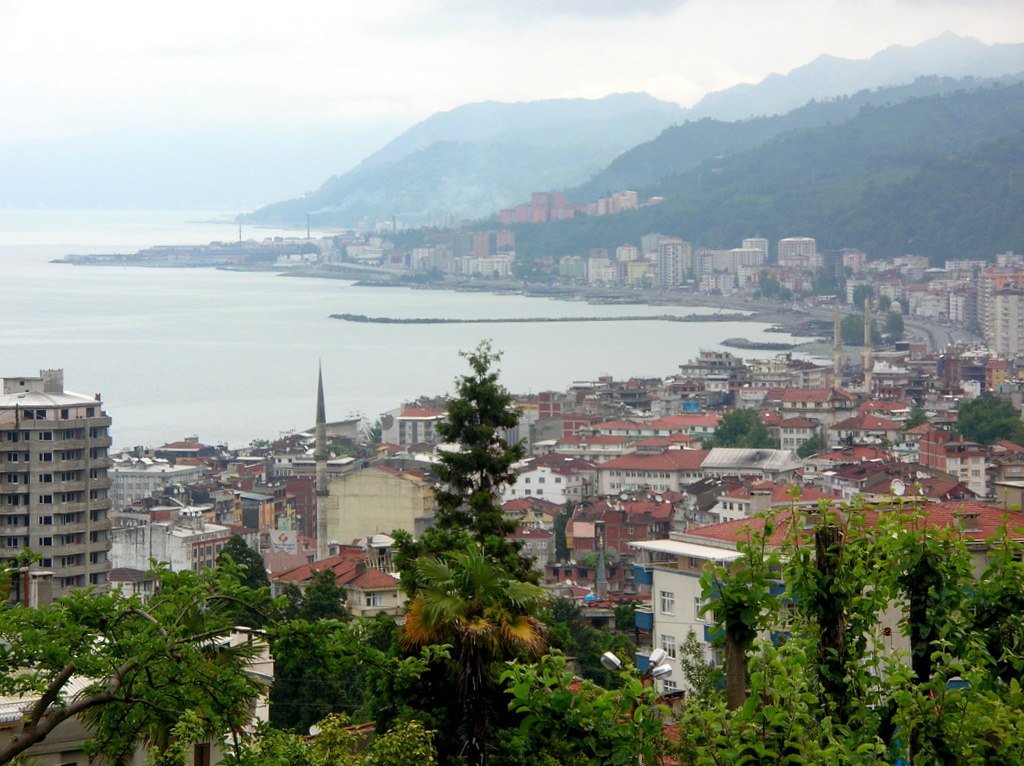
A general view of Rize city center

The Laz populated area was often contested by different Georgian principalities. Through the Battle of Murjakheti (1535), the Principality of Guria finally ensured control over the area until 1547, when it was conquered by resurgent Ottoman forces and reorganized into the Lazistan Sanjak as part of eyalet of Trabzon.

From the late-17th century onwards, the Ottoman administration built multiple bridges across the Fırtına River and its tributaries.

The province was a site of battles between Ottoman and Russian armies during the Caucasus Campaign of World War I, and was occupied by Russian forces in 1916–1918. It was returned to the Ottomans with the Treaty of Brest-Litovsk in 1918.

Since 1924, Rize has been a province of the Republic of Turkey. Until tea plantations were established in the 1940s, the province was a poor area at the far end of the country, with only the Soviet Union beyond the Iron Curtain. Many generations of people in Rize left to look for jobs in Istanbul or overseas.

=== In Turkey ===
In September 1935, the third Inspectorate General (Umumi Müfettişlik, UM) was created, to which the Rize province was included. Its establishment was based on the Law 1164 from June 1927, which was passed in order to turkefy the population. The third UM spanned across the provinces of Erzurum, Artvin, Rize, Trabzon, Kars, Gümüşhane, Erzincan and Ağrı. It was governed by an Inspector General seated in the city of Erzurum. The Inspectorate General was dissolved in 1952 during the government of the Democrat Party.

=== Life in Rize today ===
The city of Rize is a coastal town on a narrow strip of flat land between the mountains and the sea. Today, the area is wealthier, although there is a marked difference between the lifestyle of the people in the relatively wealthy city of Rize and those in the remote villages where wooden houses perch on the steep mountainside with the rain beating down. The province is known in Turkey for the production of Rize tea.

== Geography ==
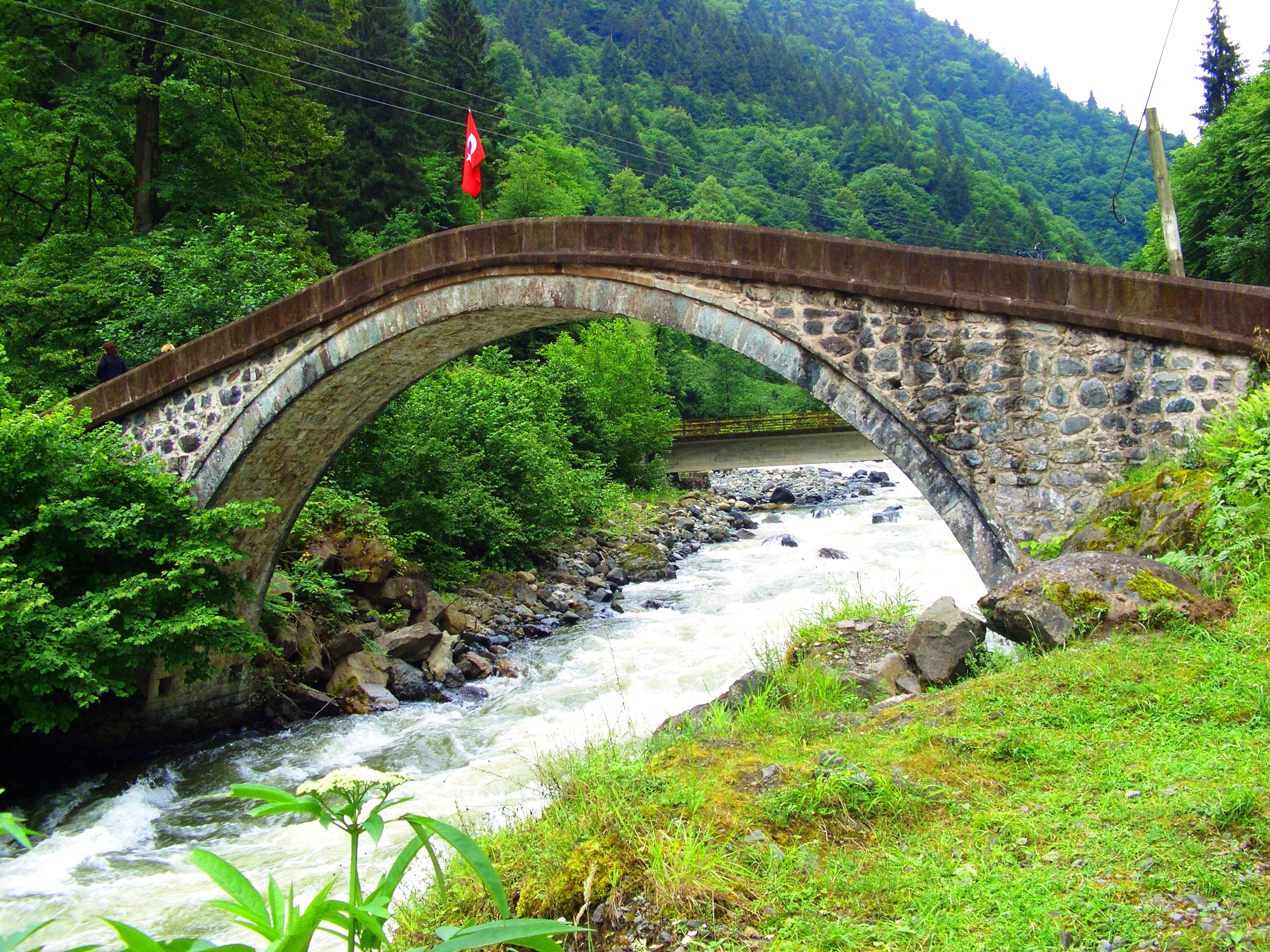
A historical bridge over Fırtına Creek

Rize is located between the Pontic Mountains and the Black Sea. It is considered to be the "wettest" corner of Turkey and is the country's main tea producing region. In addition to tea, the region is also known for growing kiwi fruit. The province is largely rural and very scenic, containing many mountain valleys and elevated yaylas (meadows). The district of Çamlıhemşin is one of Turkey's most popular venues for trekking and outdoor holidays. Roads are scarce in some of the more remote regions, so electrical powered cable cars have been installed to transport people and supplies into the mountains. Summers are cool (July average 22 °C) and winters are mild (January average 7 °C) with high levels of precipitation all year long.

The new Black Sea coast road has made Rize more accessible, but has drawn criticism for its negative effect on the region's wildlife. Since the early 2000s, Rize has seen an increase in visitors from outside the province, particularly tourist from urban areas. This increase in tourism has raised concerns among locals that the traditional way of life and the unblemished character of the natural surroundings is being endangered. The provincial governor, Enver Salihoglu (as of 2005) has stated his opposition to the expansion of the road network and has advocated a commercial focus on beekeeping, trout farming, and the growing of organic teas.

Native plants include the Cherry Laurel (Turkish: taflan or karayemiş), the fruit of which is an edible small dark plum that leaves a dark stain on the mouth and teeth. In addition, the Bilberry, which are now being actively cultivated, can be found growing the region. Rize is traversed by the northeasterly line of equal latitude and longitude.

=== Mountains ===
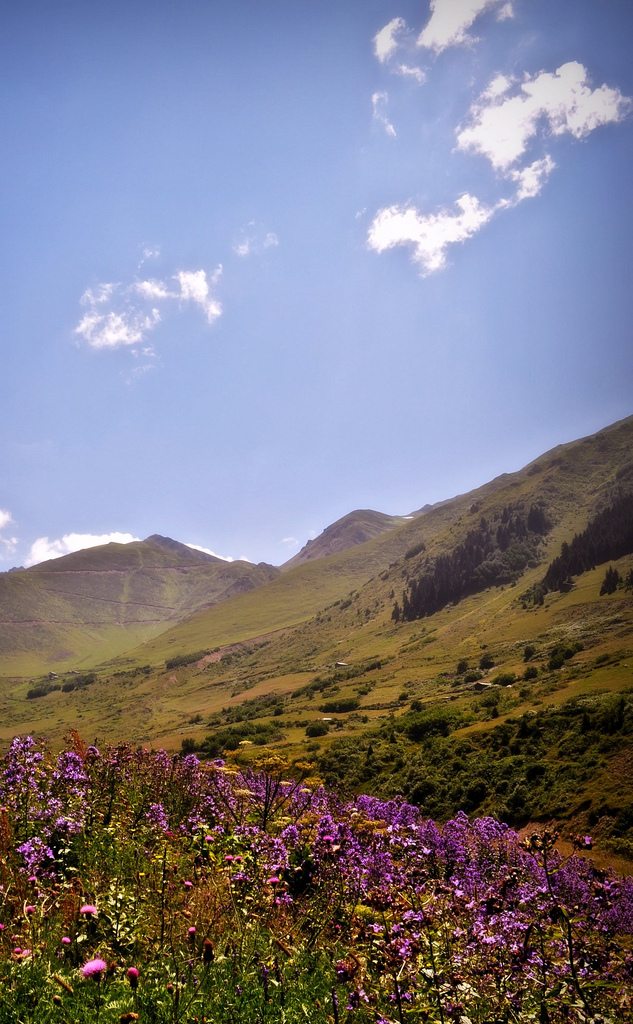
Ovit Plato is on the way to Ispir from Ikizdere, Rize, Turkey

Notable mountains

- Kaçkar (3.937 m)
- Barut (3.251 m)
- Ziglat (3.511 m)
- Verçenik (3.711 m)
- Hipot (3.560 m)

=== Rivers ===
From east to the west

- Fındıklı Deresi
- Büyükdere
- Pazar Suyu
- Karadere
- İyidere

=== Districts ===
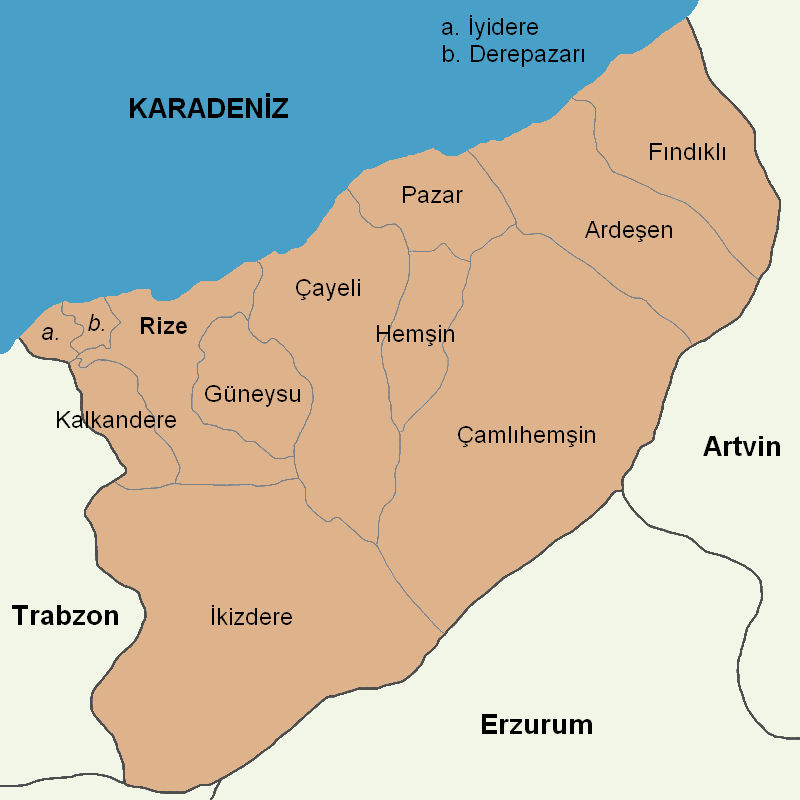

Rize province is divided into 12 districts, including the capital district Rize:

- Ardeşen
- Çamlıhemşin
- Çayeli
- Derepazarı
- Fındıklı
- Güneysu
- Hemşin
- İkizdere
- İyidere
- Kalkandere
- Pazar
- Rize

=== Geology ===
Part of the Pontic Mountains (Eastern Black Sea Mts.), Rize was formed in the Palaeozoic period. Valleys first appeared during the Cretaceous period and have since expanded due to erosion.

=== Climate ===
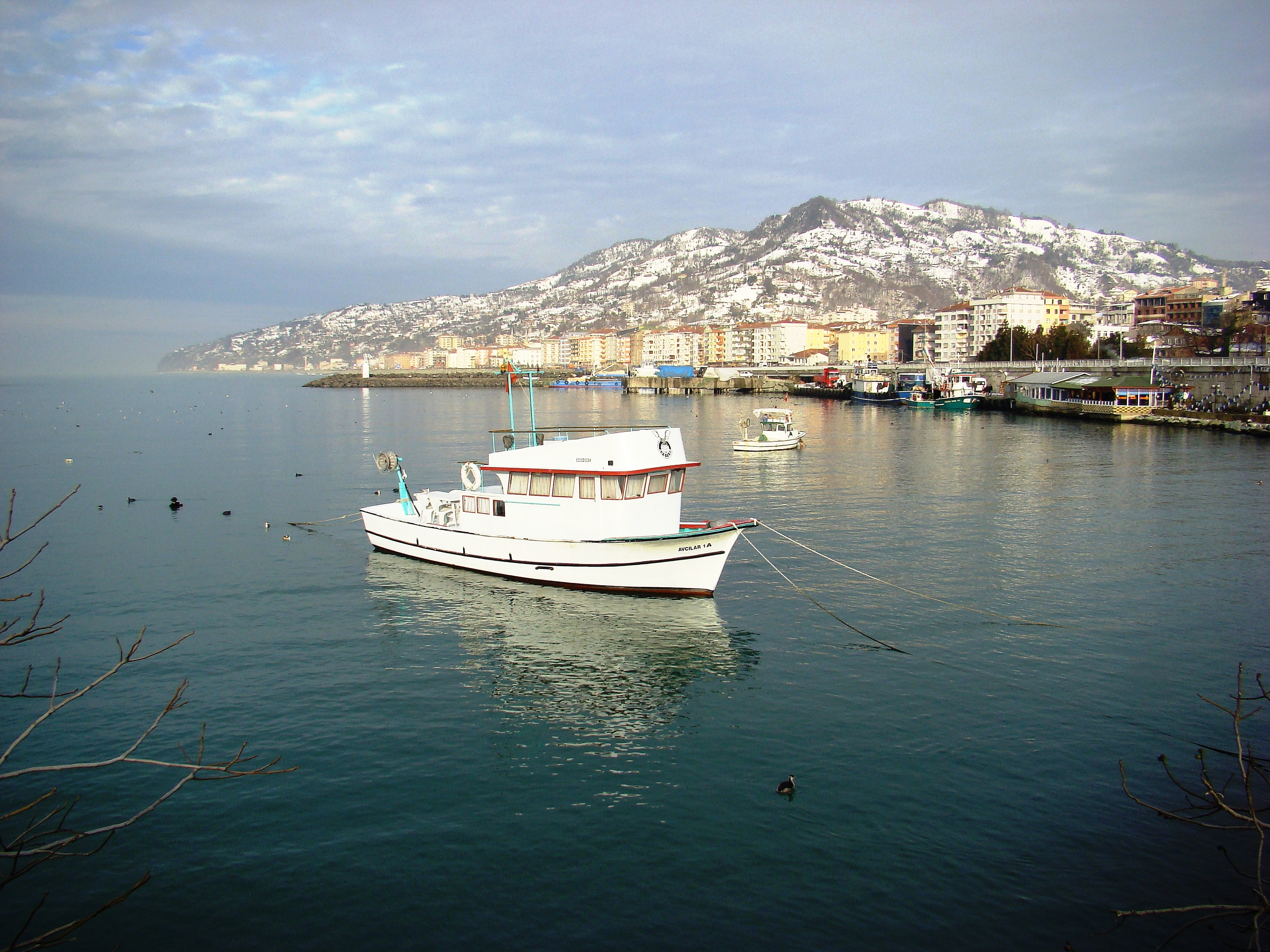
A view Çayeli district and the Black Sea

The region's climate is characterized by relatively mild to warm temperatures and evenly distributed precipitation throughout the year. The Köppen Climate Classification subtypes for this climate are Cfa (Humid Subtropical Climate) and Cfb (Oceanic Climate).

== Culture ==
=== Rize tea ===
Rize tea is a major agricultural product to the region and has changed the local economy. Rize Province is also one of the largest consumers of Rize tea too.

The province of Rize has prided itself of being the largest tea producer within Turkey. In 2021, the Rize Commerce Exchange started the construction of a seven-floor building in the shape of the traditional tulip-shaped tea glasses called ince belli, in hopes to boost local tourism.

=== Folk dances and traditional costumes ===
Folk dancers perform horon energetically when it is accompanied by kemenche. However this folk dance can also be accompanied by Tulum or kaval. Folk dancers wear traditional costumes while performing horon. Men wear shirt, vest, jacket, zipka (pants made of wool and gathered at knees) and black boots. On their jackets are silver embroideries, amulets, and hemayils with religion expressions put inside these small silver containers to br protected against evil's eye. On the other hand, women dancers wear colorful dresses and traditional hand painted head scarves including various motifs.

=== Handicrafts ===
Rize offers traditional handicrafts and handmade souvenirs to visitors. Some of them include: copper works, wicker baskets, butter churns, woven socks, shoulder bags, and spoon made of boxwood. Linen of Rize (Turkish: Rize Bezi) is a handwoven textile and is often used as part of the under layer of a dress. Kemençe is a traditional 3-stringed string instrument which is made in this province.

== Notable sites ==
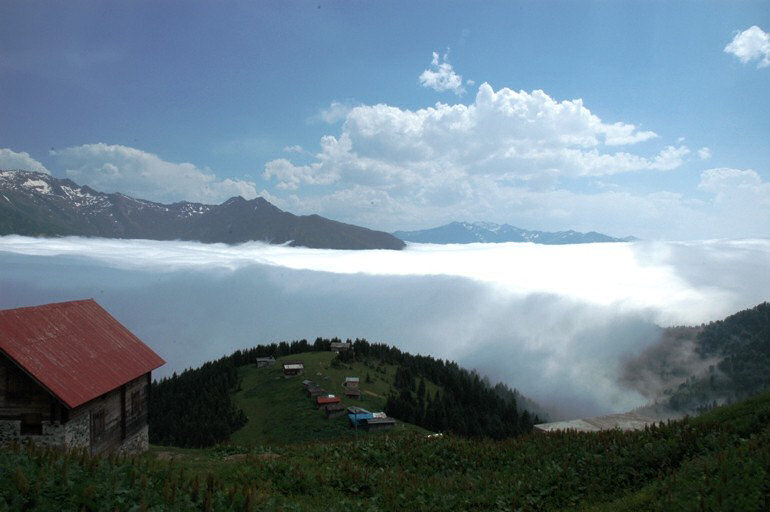
Pokut plateau, clouds above the mountains of Rize.

Sites in the province include:

- Ayder - A yayla (high meadow) area
- Amlakit Plateau
- Ovit - mountain pass
- Zilkale, a bell tower near the village of Şenköy in the district of Çamlıhemşin
- Fırtına River bridges

== See also ==
- Kaçkar Mountains
- Lazistan
