= Rize =

- Municipality
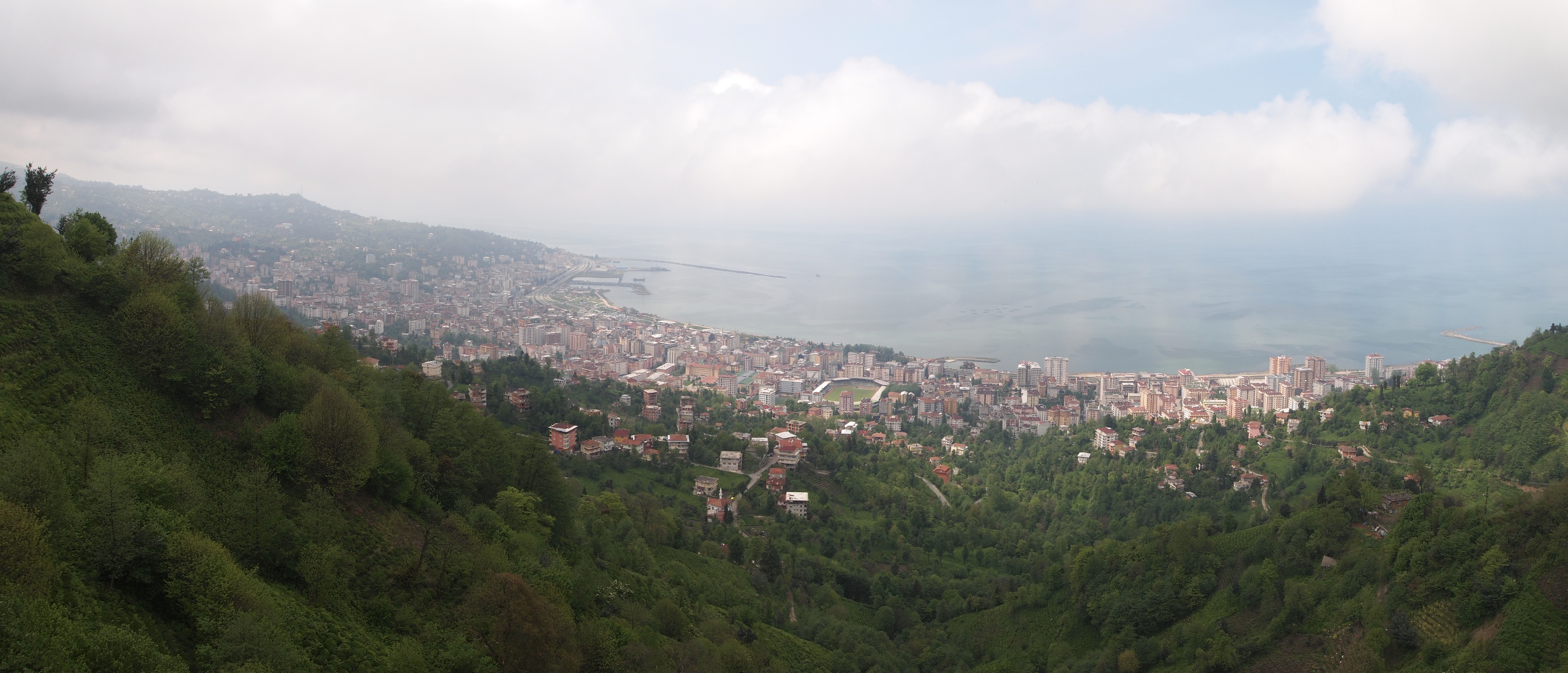
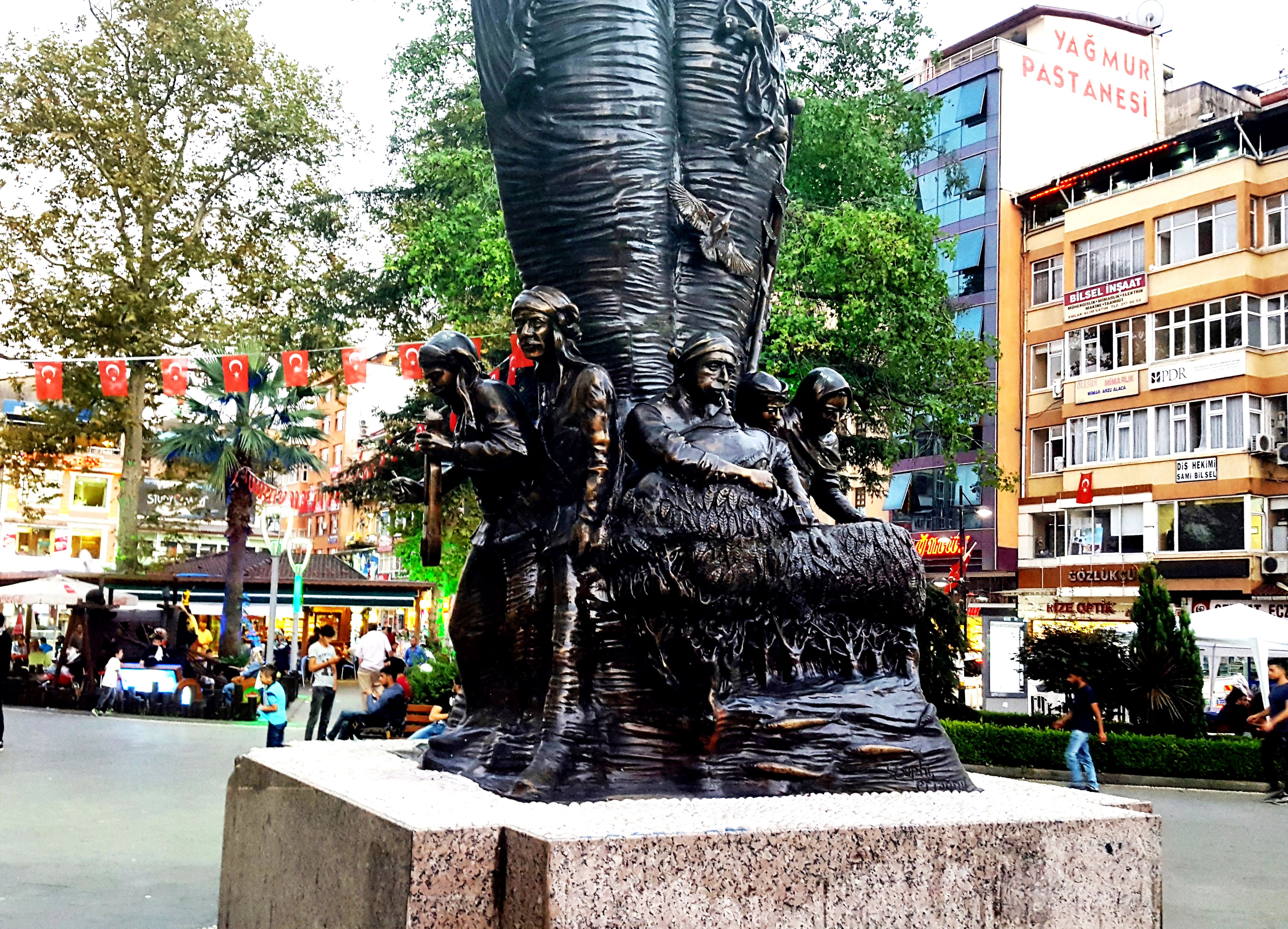
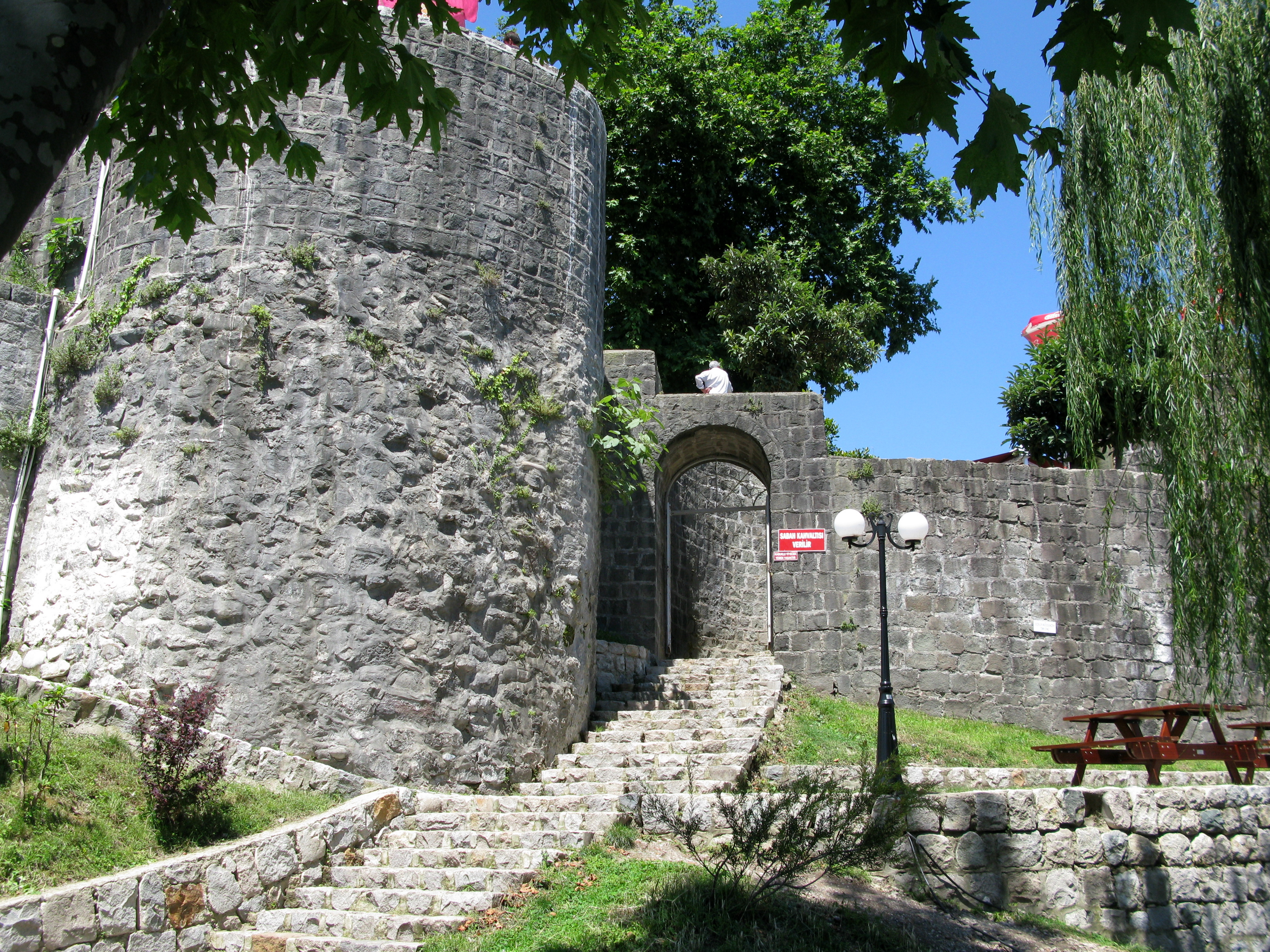
- Clockwise from top: View of Rize, Arch bridge across Firtina River, Rize Castle, Kaçkar Mountains National Park, Kiz Kulesi, Laz monument in Rize, Pokut Yaylası.

- Coat of arms

- Location within Turkey
- Coordinates: 41°01′29″N 40°31′20″E
- Country: Turkey
- Province: Rize
- District: Rize

Government
  - Mayor: Rahmi Metin (AKP)
- Area: 3,920 km^{2} (1,510 sq mi)
- Population (2021): 119,828
  - Density: 30.6/km^{2} (79.2/sq mi)
- Time zone: UTC+3 (TRT)
- Postal code: 53000
- Climate: Cfa
- Website: www.rize.bel.tr

Rize (Turkish pronunciation: [ɾi'ze]; Greek: Ριζούντα, romanized: Rizoúnta; Laz: რიზინი, romanized: Rizini; Georgian: რიზე) is a coastal city in the eastern part of the Black Sea Region of Turkey. It is the seat of Rize Province and Rize District. Its population is 119,828 (2021). Rize is a typical Turkish provincial capital with little in the way of nightlife or entertainment. Since the border with Georgia was opened in the early 1990s, the Black Sea coast road has been widened and the town is much wealthier than it used to be. Current Turkish President Recep Tayyip Erdoğan's family has its roots in Rize and the local university is named after him. The city is linked by road with Trabzon (41 miles [66 km] west), Hopa (55 miles [88 km] east on the Georgian border), and Erzurum (south). The Rize–Artvin Airport started operating in 2022.

== Name ==
The name comes from Greek ρίζα (riza) or Ριζαίον (Rizaion), meaning "mountain slopes" (ρίζα in Greek means root). In modern times, its Greek name was usually Ριζούντα (Rizunda). Its Latin forms are Rhizus and Rhizaeum, the latter of which is used in the Catholic Church's list of titular sees as the name of bishopric of the town, which was once part of the late Roman province of Pontus Polemoniacus).

Other names (17th – 19th c.): Rizeh, Riseh, Rhizium, Irizeh, Irissa; used in trade or by merchants.

== History ==
Arrian was the first writer to mention Rize. In his Periplus of the Euxine Sea, he described it as a city founded at the mouth of the river of the same name, the ancient and Byzantine ῾Ρίζιος ποταμός. Dated to 130–131AD and written as a letter to Roman Emperor Hadrian, the work records how its author, the governor of Cappadocia, made a tour of the Eastern Black Sea territories that formed part of his jurisdiction, first visiting the Roman Empire's Eastern Anatolian frontier garrisons before pushing on to the Black Sea coast in the Trabzon (Trebizond) region. The city of Rize formed part of the historic Georgian province of Chaneti (Georgian: ჭანეთი).

From 1547, Chaneti province was incorporated into the Ottoman Empire and became a part of the sancak of Lazistan. The city was claimed by the short-lived Democratic Republic of Georgia between 1918 and 1920. On the basis of the 1921 Treaty of Kars, Soviet Russia granted Rize to Turkey along with the other territories of Artvin, Ardahan, and Hopa (Georgian: ხუფათი).

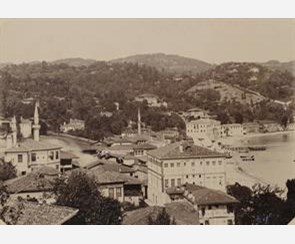
Rize in 1890s

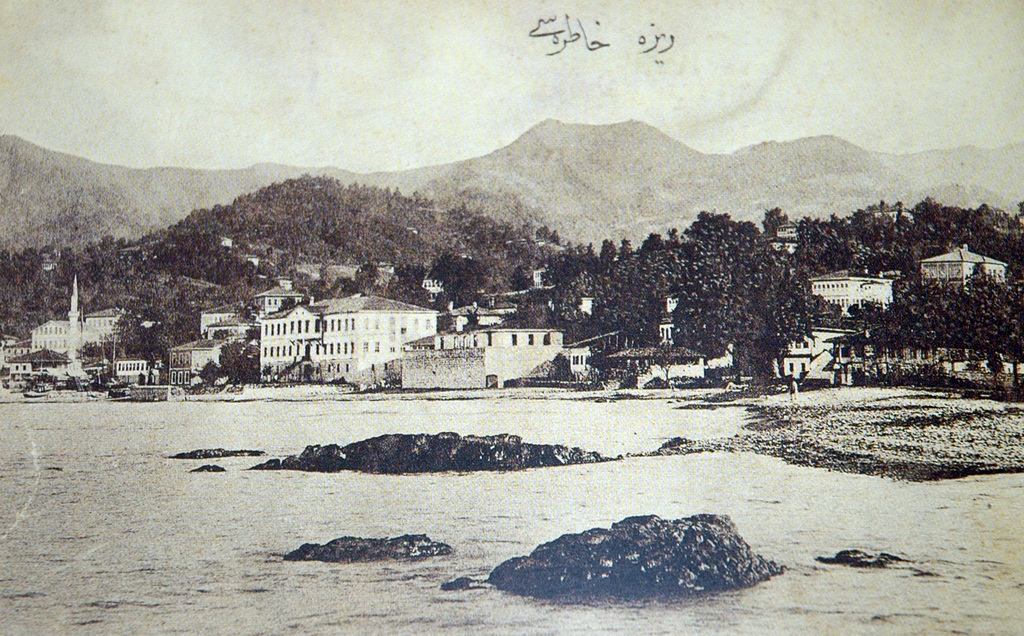
Rize, 1910s, Ottoman-era postcard

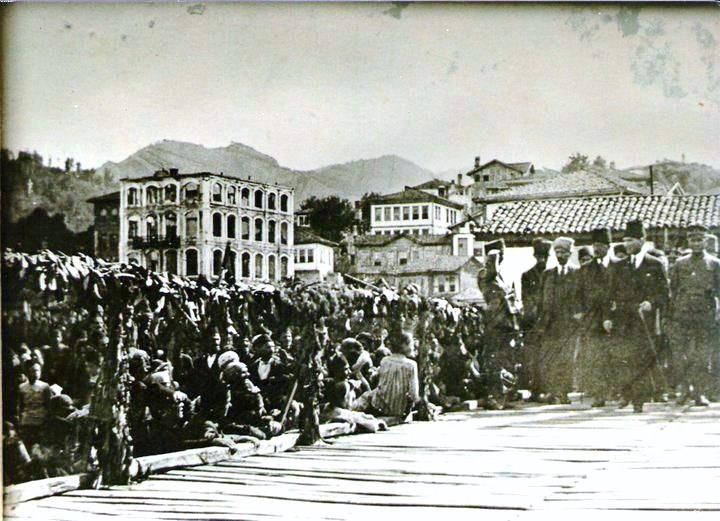
Mustafa Kemal Paşa in Rize, 1920s

== Geography ==
The city is built around a small bay on the Black Sea coast, on a narrow strip of flat land between the sea and the mountains behind. The coastal strip is being expanded with landfill and the city is expanding up the steep hillsides away from the coast.

Rize is probably best known for its black tea which was introduced to the region in the 1940s and 1950s, changing the destiny of a region which was until then desperately poor. The local tea research institute was founded in 1958 and other tea gardens can be seen all around the town. Tea is even planted in local gardens. Rize is a centre for processing and shipping locally grown Rize Tea. More recently kiwifruit plants have also been grown in Rize. Fishing remains another important local source of income.

Tourism to destinations in and around Rize is growing in importance.

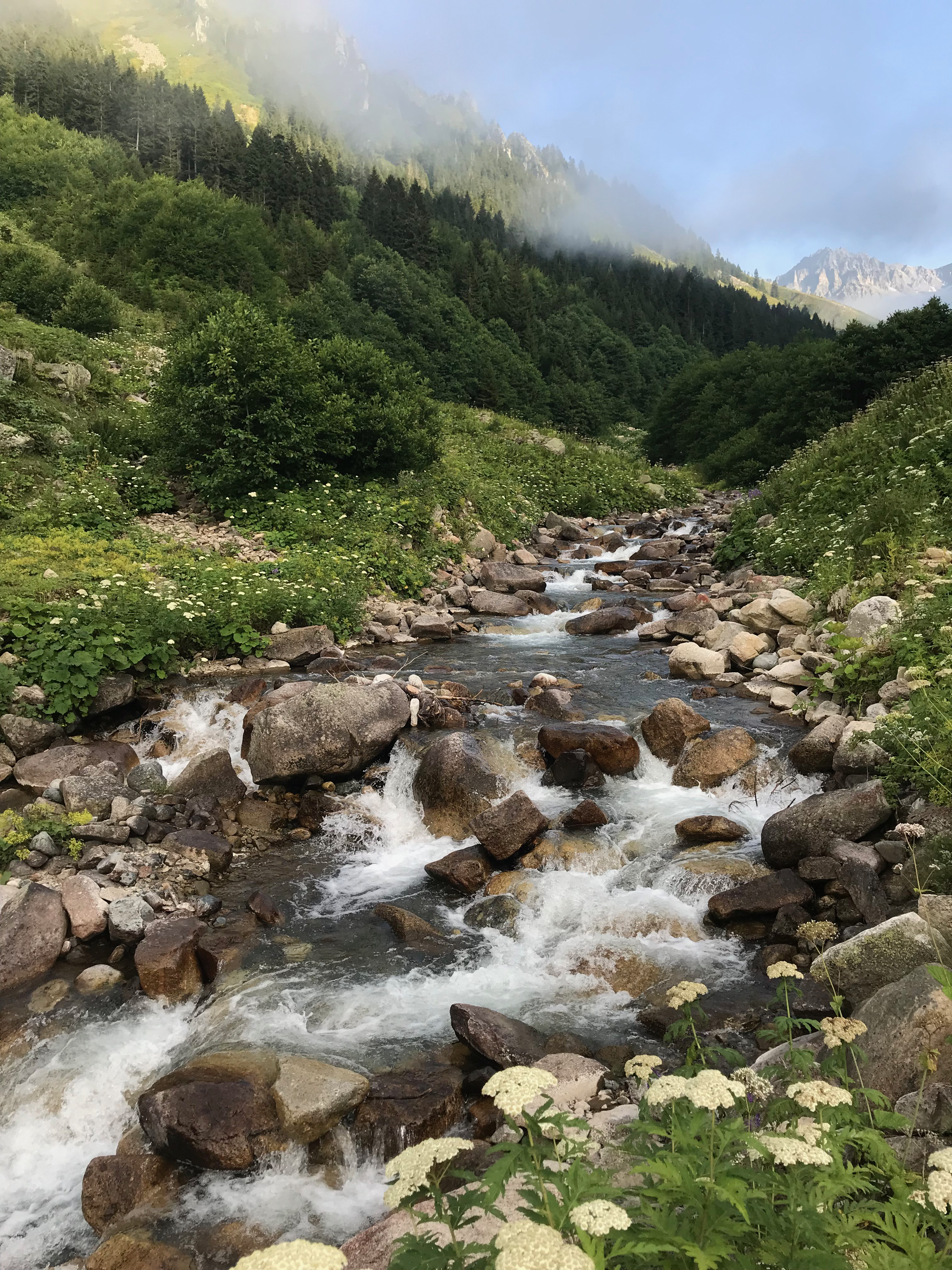
Kaçkar Mountains National Park

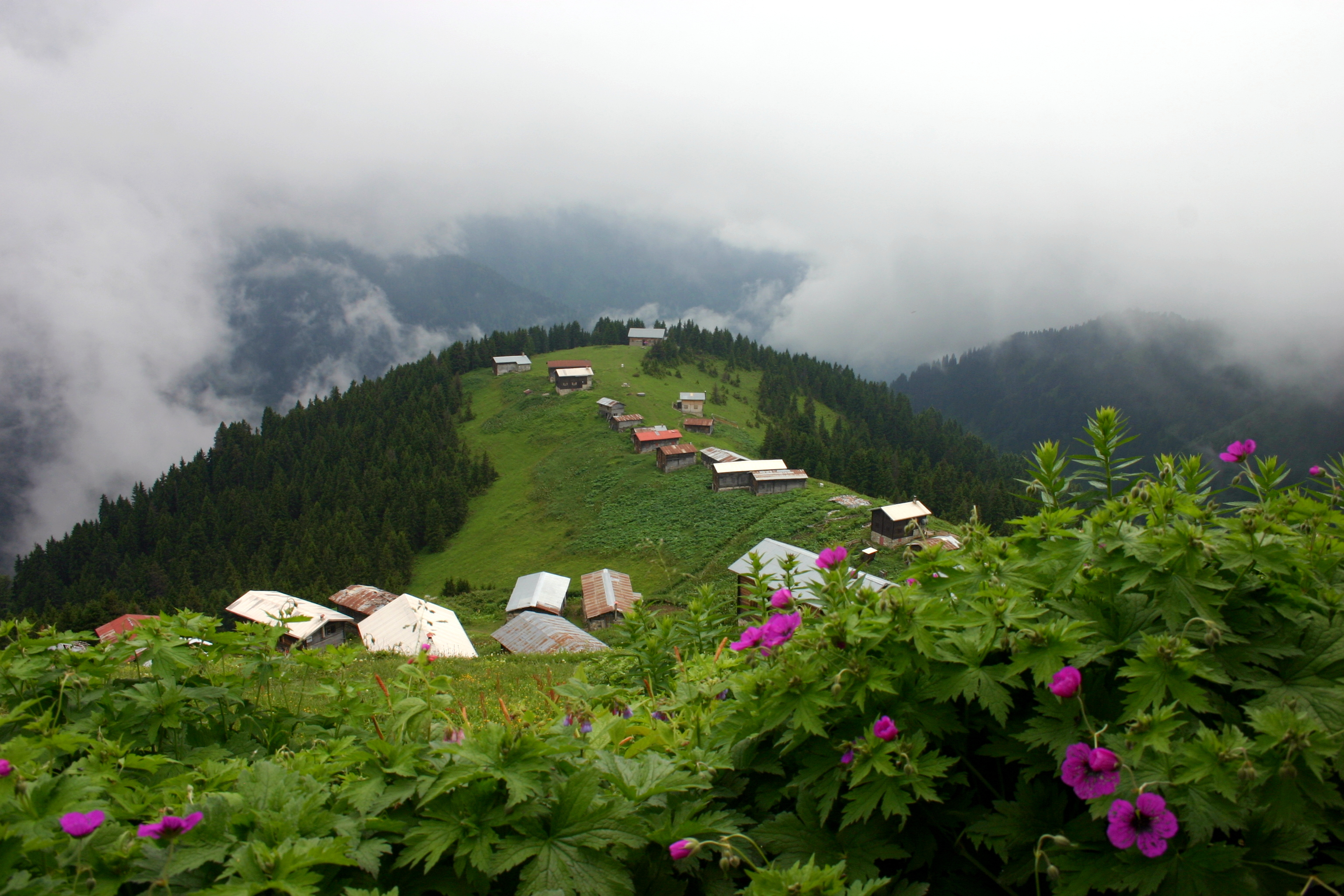
Pokut Yayla is a popular tourism destination

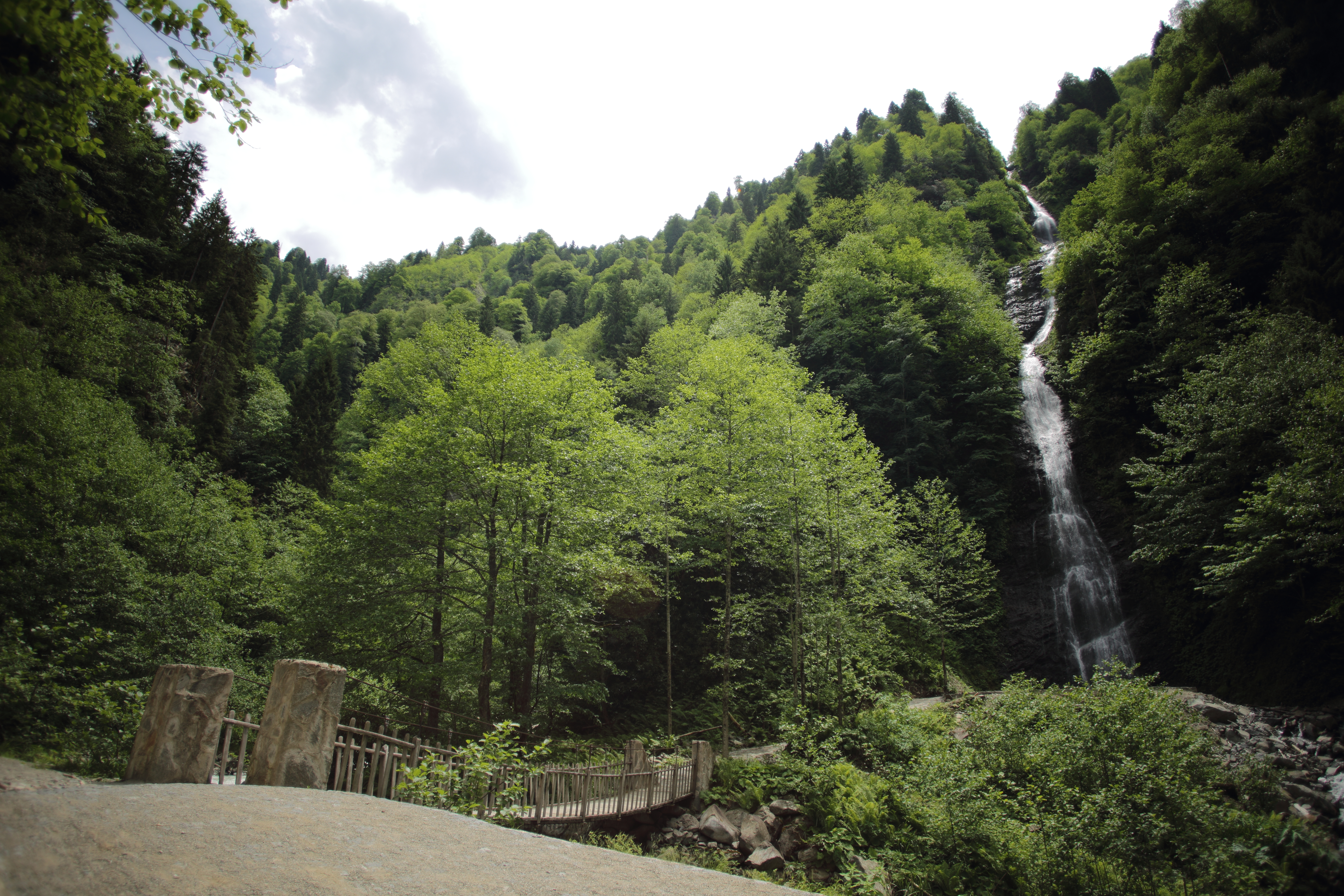
Tar Creek Waterfall

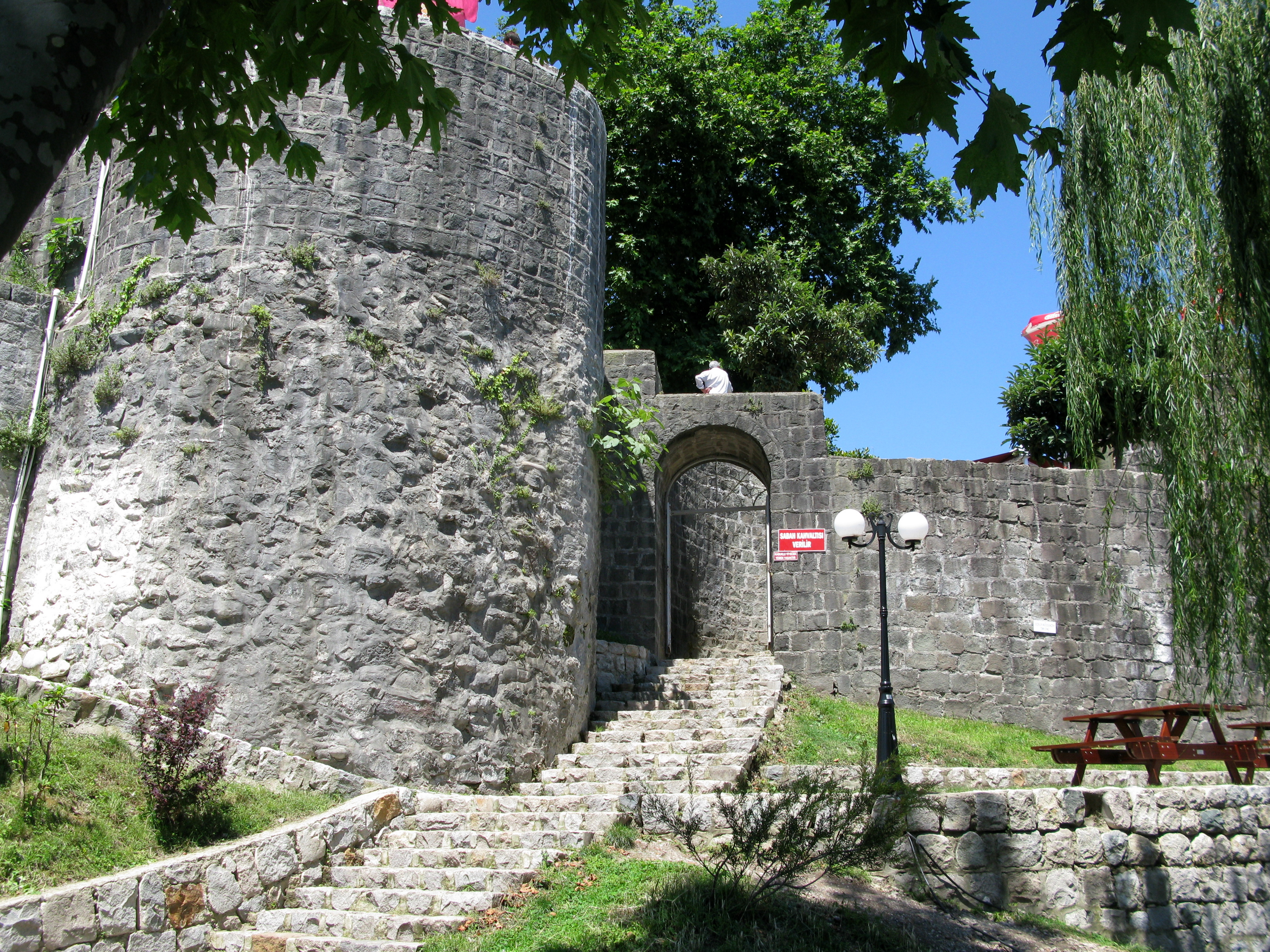
Entrance to Rize Castle

== Climate ==
Rize has a humid subtropical climate (Köppen: Cfa, Trewartha: Cf). However, as any mountainous region of Turkey, it is rich in climatic variety. The climate turns oceanic (Cfb) on the hillsides, continental (Dfb/Dc) and subarctic (Dfc/Eo) on the mountain slopes and in the yaylas, the highlands and highland plateaus. When the Köppen climate classification was being created, the city centre had a borderline oceanic-humid subtropical climate, falling just under the 22 °C (72 °F) threshold for the hottest month of the year, yet climate change and global warming have contributed to the city being classified as humid subtropical in recent decades.

The city's climate is defined by mild temperate conditions, with warm summers, cool winters and heavy rainfall year-round with a maximum in late autumn (October to December). The city has relatively few sunshine hours, lower than many stereotypically cloudy locations in Western Europe. Snowfall is somewhat common between the months of December and March, snowing for a week or two, and it can be heavy once it snows (this is due to the "lake-effect snow"). The heaviest recorded snowfall in the city center was 187 cm (73.6 inches), recorded on 6 January 1942. The water temperature, typical for the Black Sea coast, is never too warm or cold, fluctuating between 8 and 20 °C (46 and 68 °F) throughout the year.

Climate data for Rize (1991–2020, extremes 1928–2023)
Month	Jan	Feb	Mar	Apr	May	Jun	Jul	Aug	Sep	Oct	Nov	Dec	Year
Record high °C (°F)	26.6 (79.9)	28.1 (82.6)	32.6 (90.7)	35.8 (96.4)	38.2 (100.8)	36.1 (97.0)	35.4 (95.7)	35.6 (96.1)	35.0 (95.0)	33.8 (92.8)	30.4 (86.7)	26.7 (80.1)	38.2 (100.8)
Mean daily maximum °C (°F)	11.0 (51.8)	11.1 (52.0)	12.9 (55.2)	15.9 (60.6)	20.2 (68.4)	24.9 (76.8)	27.4 (81.3)	28.1 (82.6)	25.4 (77.7)	21.4 (70.5)	16.7 (62.1)	13.0 (55.4)	19.0 (66.2)
Daily mean °C (°F)	6.9 (44.4)	6.8 (44.2)	8.7 (47.7)	11.8 (53.2)	16.6 (61.9)	21.2 (70.2)	23.8 (74.8)	24.5 (76.1)	21.2 (70.2)	17.2 (63.0)	12.1 (53.8)	8.7 (47.7)	15.0 (59.0)
Mean daily minimum °C (°F)	3.9 (39.0)	3.7 (38.7)	5.4 (41.7)	8.5 (47.3)	13.2 (55.8)	17.5 (63.5)	20.5 (68.9)	21.2 (70.2)	17.7 (63.9)	13.9 (57.0)	8.8 (47.8)	5.6 (42.1)	11.7 (53.1)
Record low °C (°F)	−6.5 (20.3)	−6.6 (20.1)	−7 (19)	−2.8 (27.0)	4.0 (39.2)	7.8 (46.0)	12.0 (53.6)	13.4 (56.1)	4.6 (40.3)	2.5 (36.5)	−2.6 (27.3)	−4 (25)	−7.0 (19.4)
Average precipitation mm (inches)	223.1 (8.78)	170.5 (6.71)	154.0 (6.06)	90.5 (3.56)	96.6 (3.80)	148.4 (5.84)	163.4 (6.43)	192.5 (7.58)	265.1 (10.44)	307.3 (12.10)	246.0 (9.69)	252.1 (9.93)	2,309.5 (90.93)
Average precipitation days	15.33	14.5	16.8	14.83	15.13	14.83	13.7	14.63	14.8	15.4	14.13	15.5	179.58
Average relative humidity (%)	76.1	75.0	75.4	76.8	78.1	77.2	77.3	78.3	79.1	80.6	78.4	76.7	77.4
Mean monthly sunshine hours	62.0	84.8	114.7	144.0	179.8	195.0	176.7	161.2	156.0	124.0	87.0	58.9	1,544.1
Mean daily sunshine hours	2.0	3.0	3.7	4.8	5.8	6.5	5.7	5.2	5.2	4.0	2.9	1.9	4.2
Source 1: Turkish State Meteorological Service
Source 2: NOAA (humidity)

== Economy and produce ==
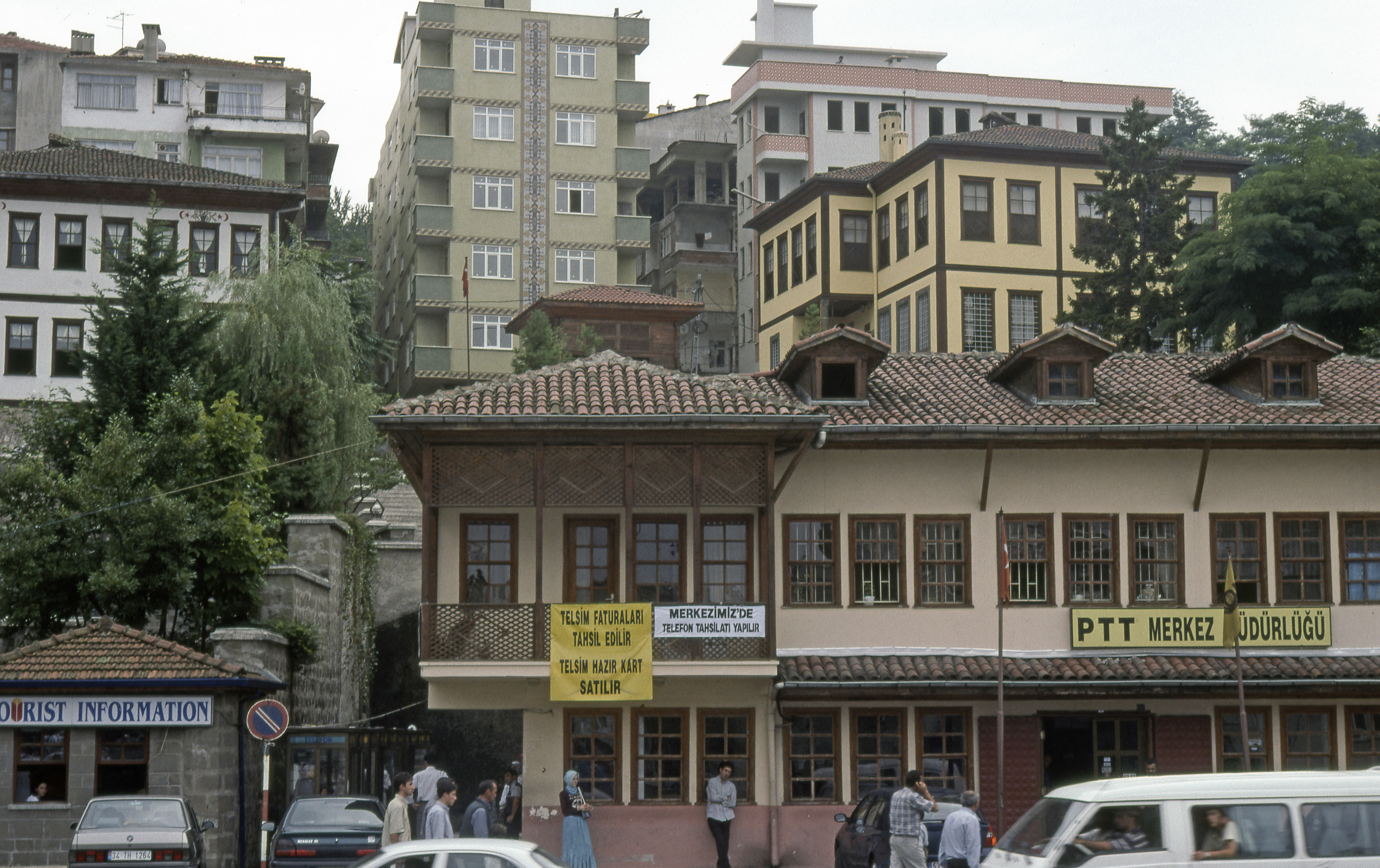
Former PTT Offices

Historically, Rize grew oranges. However, weather destroyed the crops in the early 20th century, and the industry declined. The area also produced small amounts of manganese.

Rize's economic structure is primarily based on its geographic location since it is in a very mountainous location, making industrial development impractical. Given the lack of rail transit, most goods have to travel by truck or ship, which makes exporting and importing difficult. Rize's primary trading partner is Trabzon, the most developed city of the northeast Black Sea region. Rize's main exports are agriculturally based; tea and kiwifruit are among its most popular commodities. In particular the state-owned tea company Çaykur is based in Rize.

== Education ==
Rize University was founded in 2006. Its name was changed to Recep Tayyip Erdoğan University in 2011.

== Culture ==
Rize Castle is a partly ruined medieval castle to the southwest of the city centre.

Rize Ziraat Botanical Garden, founded in 1924, is two kilometers to the southwest.

== Sports ==
Rize's sports venues include Rize Atatürk Stadium, Yeni Rize Şehir Stadı and Rize Sports Complex consisting of Rize Sports Hall and Rize Indoor Swimming Pool.

The football team of Çaykur Rizespor play in the Süper Lig. Pazarspor football team compete in the TFF Third League.

== Rize Municipality Mayors ==
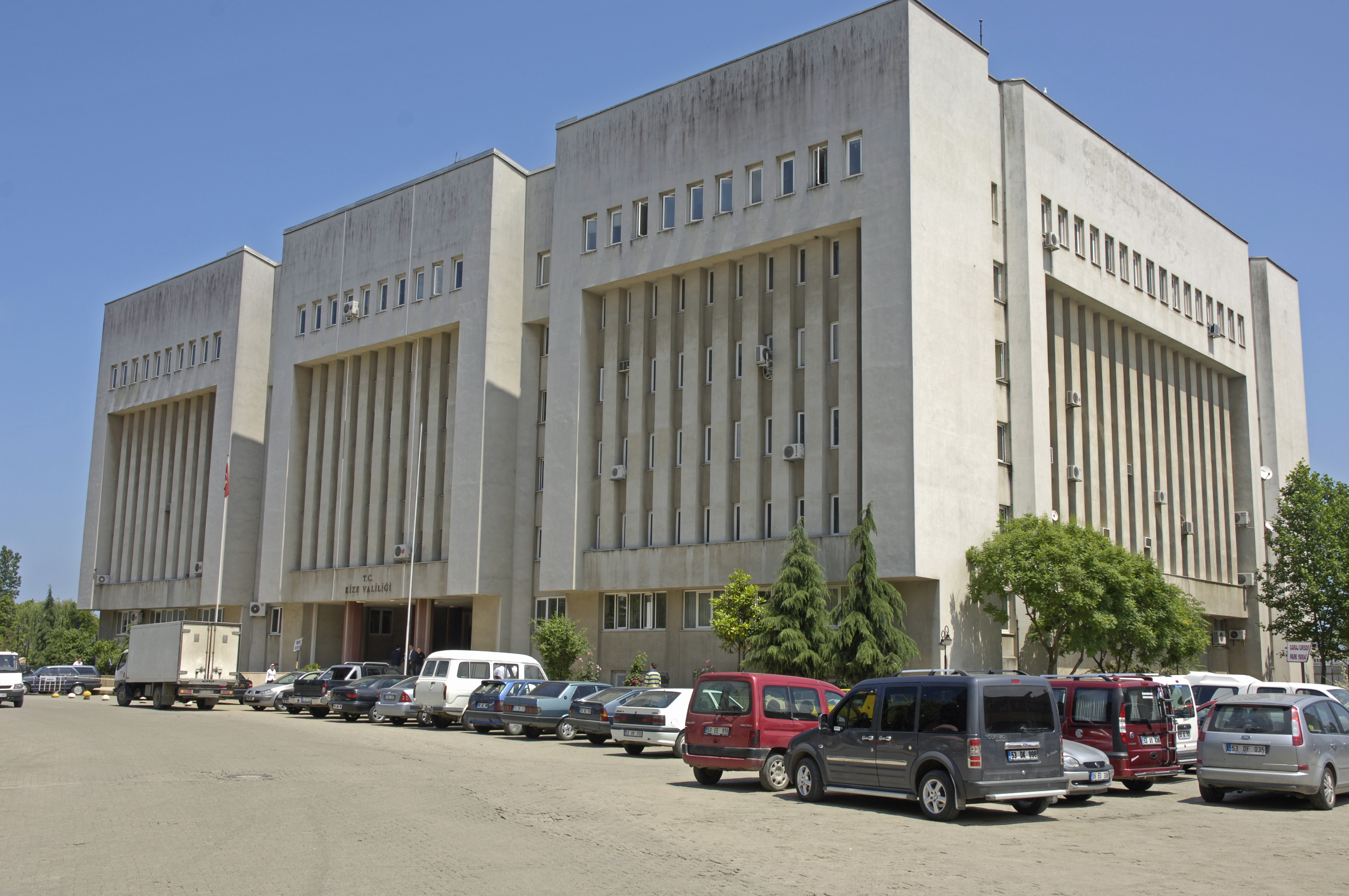
Rize Municipality Building

- Ethem Şevki Kepenek (1950-1954) DP
- Ekrem Orhon (1965-1981) AP
- Şevki Yılmaz (1994-1995) RP
- Hızır Hop (1995-2004) ANAP
- Halil Bakirci (2004-2014) AKP
- Reşat Kasap (2014-2019) AKP
- Rahmi Metin (2019-present) AKP

== Notable people ==
- Recep Tayyip Erdoğan (born 1954), Turkish politician, 25th Prime Minister of Turkey (2003–2014), and 12th President of Turkey (2014–present)
- Sinem Kobal television and film actress
- Macit Karaahmetoğlu german politician
- Köksal Toptan politician
- Temel Kotil he was the CEO of Turkish Airlines

== Population ==
Population of Rize Province
Year	Population
1975	36,044
1980	43,407
1985	50,221
1990	52,031
1997	73,420
2000	78,144
2009	96,503
2021	119,828
2024	346,977
