= List of countries by tea consumption per capita =

Wikipedia list

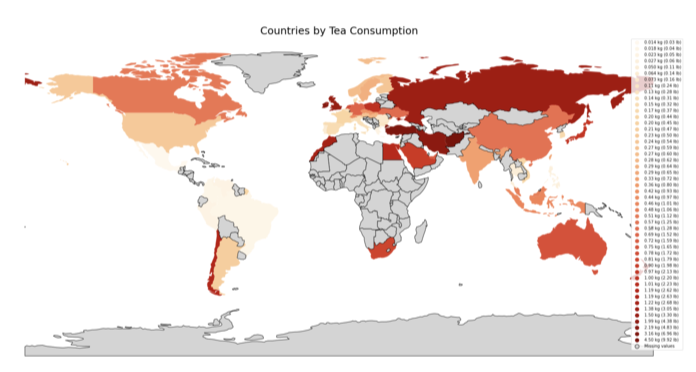
Tea consumption per country

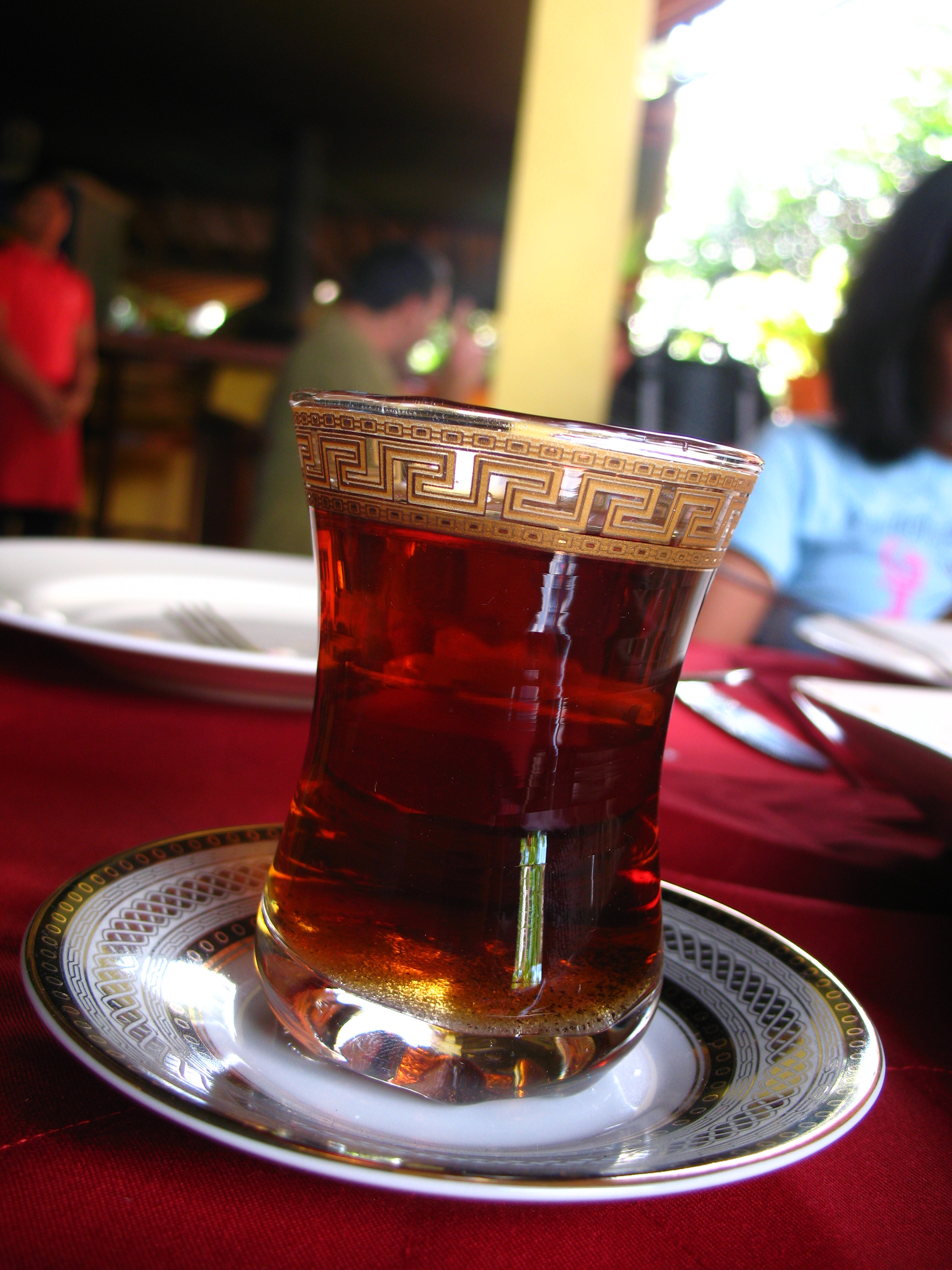
Rize çayı, the traditional Turkish black tea. As of 2025, Turkey still leads the global consumption.

This is a list of countries ordered by annual per capita consumption of tea, as of 2016.

Rank	Country/region	Tea consumption
1	Turkey	3.16 kg (6.96 lb)
2	Ireland	2.36 kg (5.21 lb)
3	Azerbaijan	2.10 kg (4.63 lb)
4	United Kingdom	1.82 kg (4.01 lb)
5	Pakistan	1.50 kg (3.30 lb)
6	Iran	1.50 kg (3.30 lb)
7	Russia	1.38 kg (3.05 lb)
8	Morocco	1.22 kg (2.68 lb)
9	New Zealand	1.19 kg (2.63 lb)
10	Chile	1.19 kg (2.62 lb)
11	Egypt	1.01 kg (2.23 lb)
12	Poland	1.00 kg (2.20 lb)
13	Japan	0.97 kg (2.13 lb)
14	Saudi Arabia	0.90 kg (1.98 lb)
15	South Africa	0.81 kg (1.79 lb)
16	Netherlands	0.78 kg (1.72 lb)
17	Australia	0.75 kg (1.65 lb)
18	United Arab Emirates	0.72 kg (1.59 lb)
19	Germany	0.69 kg (1.52 lb)
20	Hong Kong	0.65 kg (1.43 lb)
21	Ukraine	0.58 kg (1.28 lb)
22	China	0.57 kg (1.25 lb)
23	Canada	0.51 kg (1.12 lb)
24	Malaysia	0.48 kg (1.06 lb)
25	Indonesia	0.46 kg (1.01 lb)
26	Switzerland	0.44 kg (0.97 lb)
27	Czech Republic	0.42 kg (0.93 lb)
28	Singapore	0.37 kg (0.81 lb)
29	Slovakia	0.36 kg (0.80 lb)
30	India	0.33 kg (0.72 lb)
31	Taiwan	0.29 kg (0.65 lb)
32	Sweden	0.29 kg (0.64 lb)
33	Hungary	0.28 kg (0.62 lb)
34	Norway	0.27 kg (0.60 lb)
35	Austria	0.27 kg (0.59 lb)
36	Finland	0.24 kg (0.54 lb)
37	United States	0.23 kg (0.50 lb)
38	Argentina	0.21 kg (0.47 lb)
39	Israel	0.20 kg (0.45 lb)
40	France	0.20 kg (0.44 lb)
41	Vietnam	0.20 kg (0.44 lb)
42	South Korea	0.17 kg (0.37 lb)
43	Spain	0.15 kg (0.32 lb)
44	Denmark	0.15 kg (0.32 lb)
45	Italy	0.14 kg (0.31 lb)
46	Belgium	0.13 kg (0.28 lb)
47	Bulgaria	0.11 kg (0.24 lb)
48	Romania	0.073 kg (0.16 lb)
49	Portugal	0.064 kg (0.14 lb)
50	Thailand	0.050 kg (0.11 lb)
51	Philippines	0.027 kg (0.06 lb)
52	Greece	0.023 kg (0.05 lb)
53	Venezuela	0.023 kg (0.05 lb)
54	Peru	0.023 kg (0.05 lb)
55	Colombia	0.018 kg (0.04 lb)

== Gallery of tea varieties ==
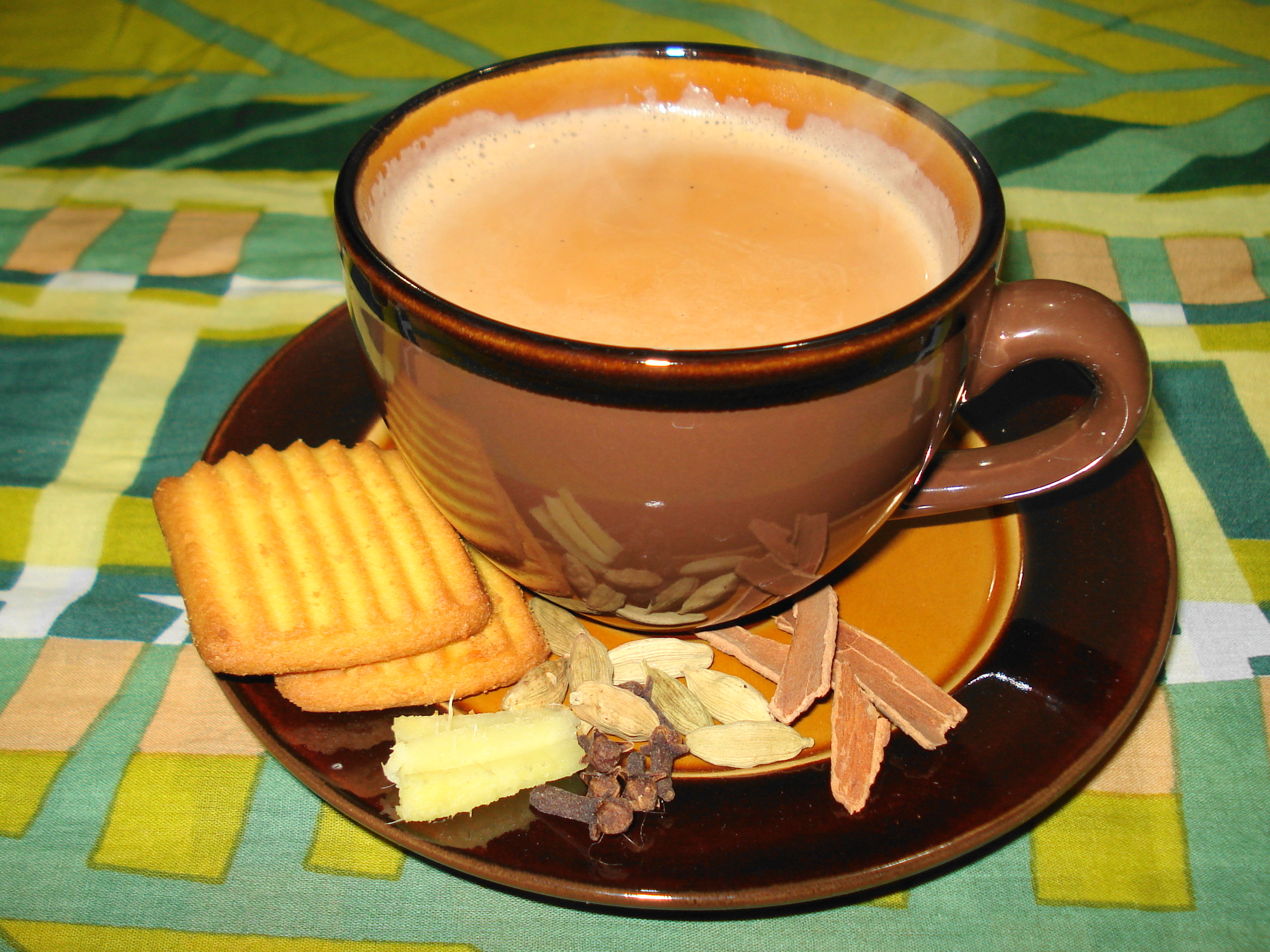
Masala chai from the Indian subcontinent

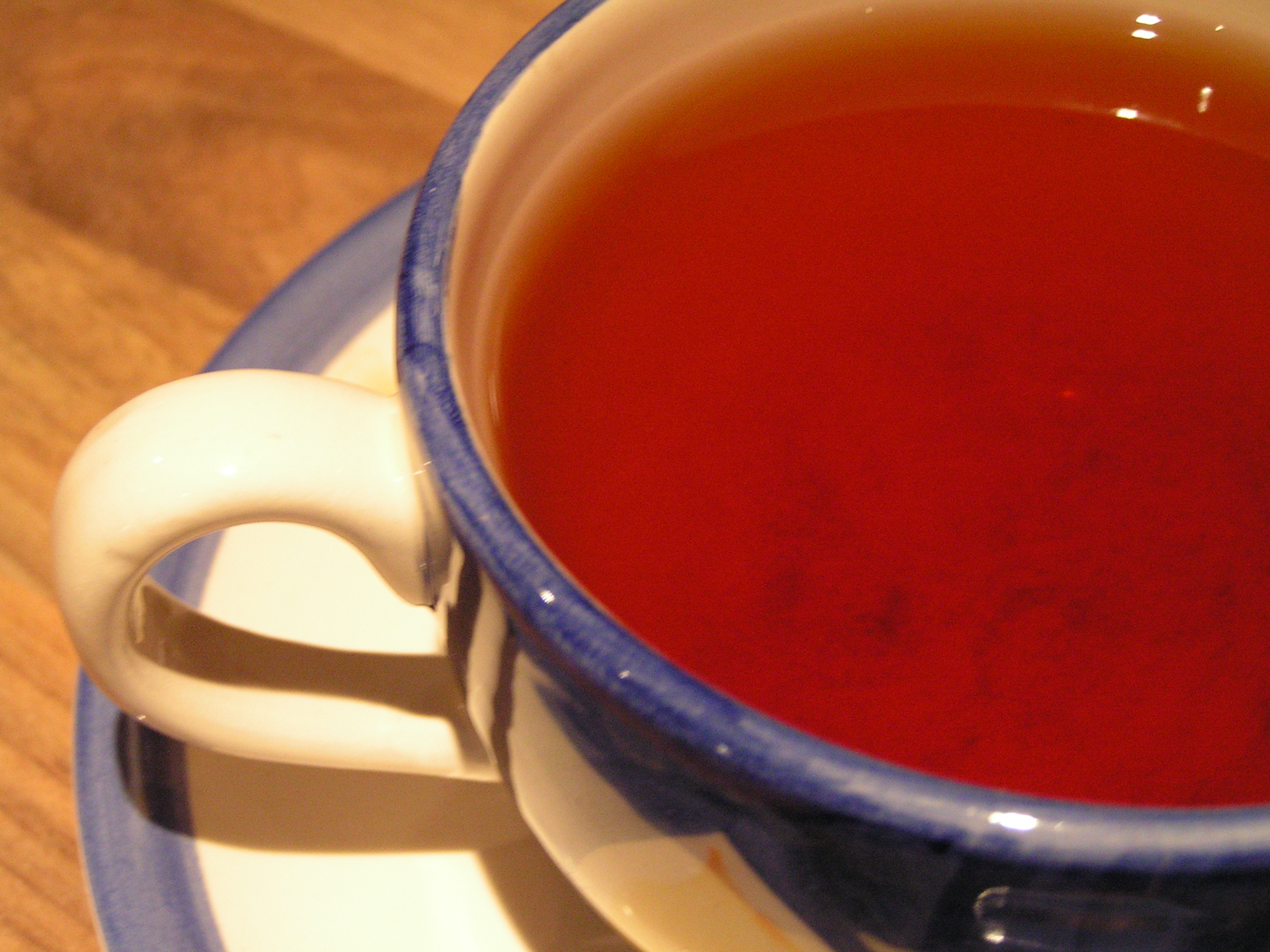
A cup of Earl Grey tea

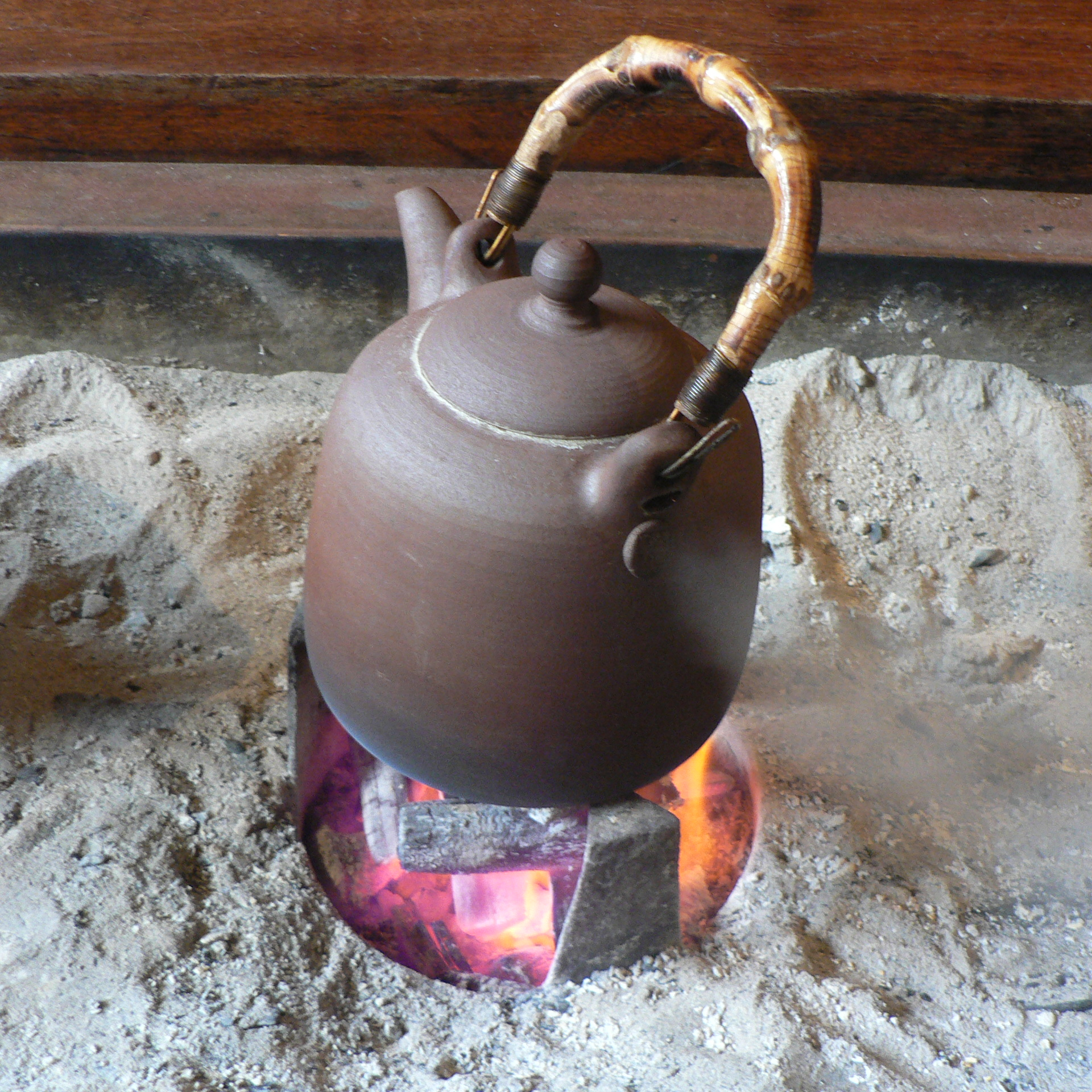
Tea kettle over hot coals

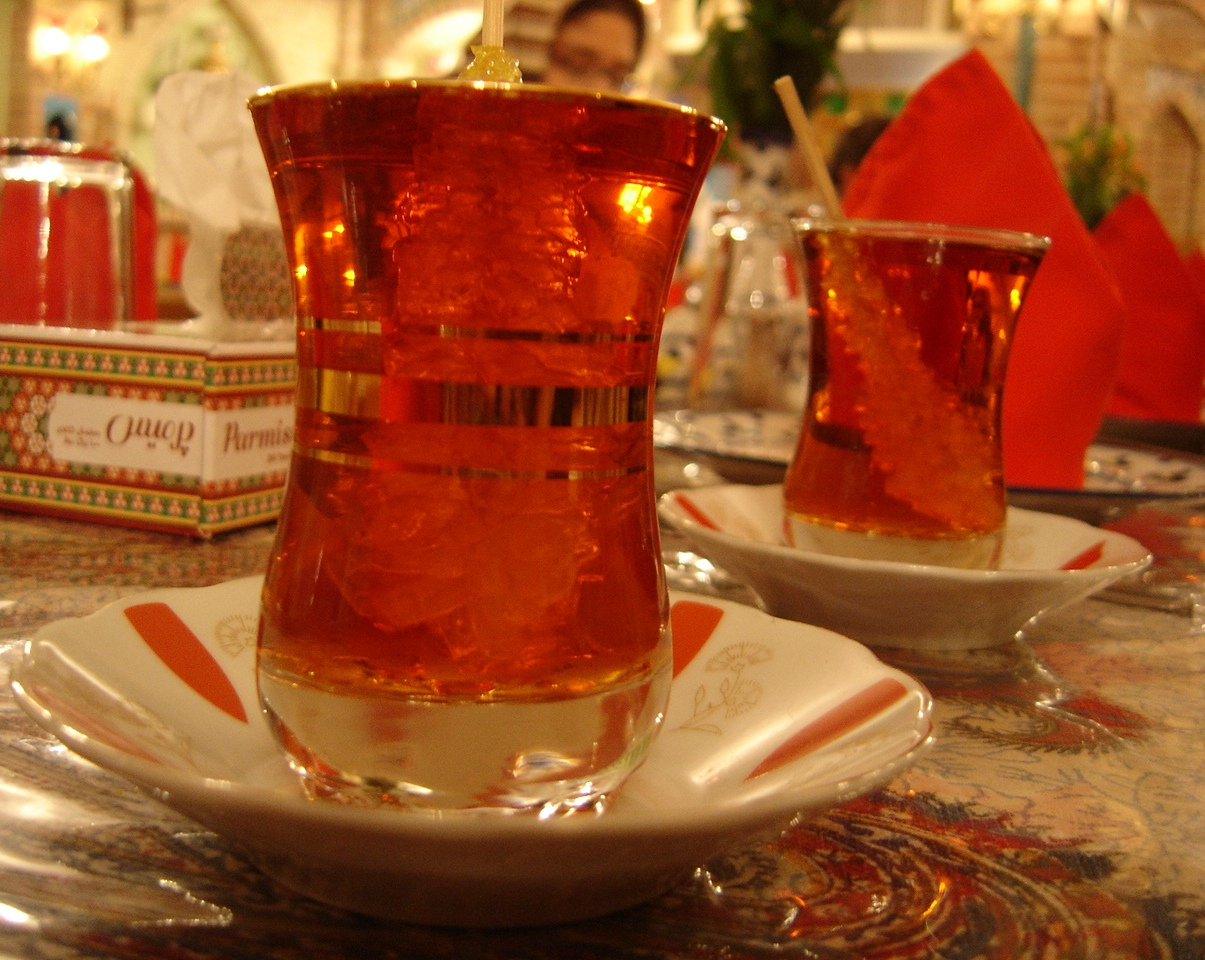
Chai-o Nabat (Persian tea with rock sugar) in Tehran

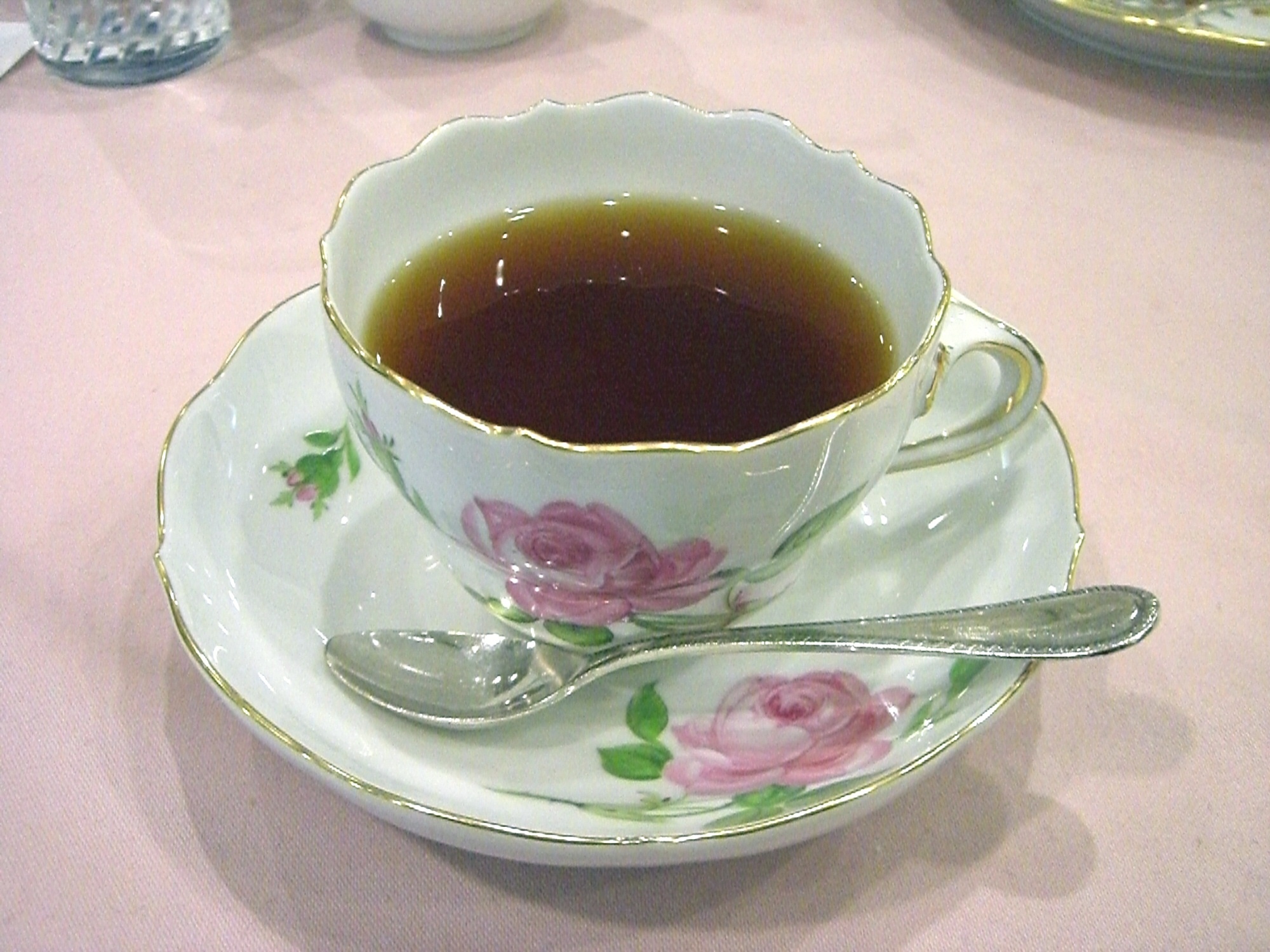
Black tea in a Meissen pink-rose tea cup

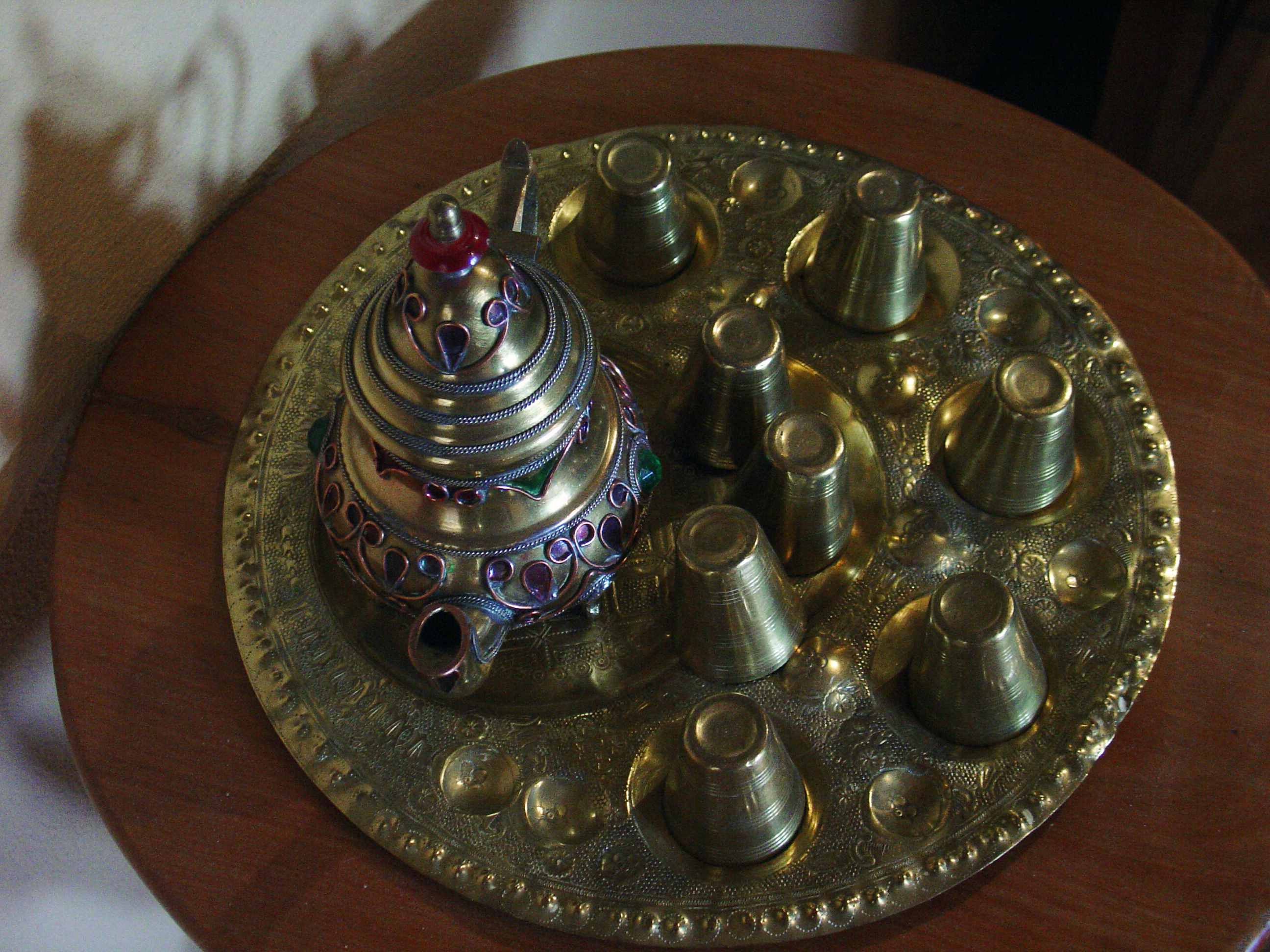
A Moroccan tea set

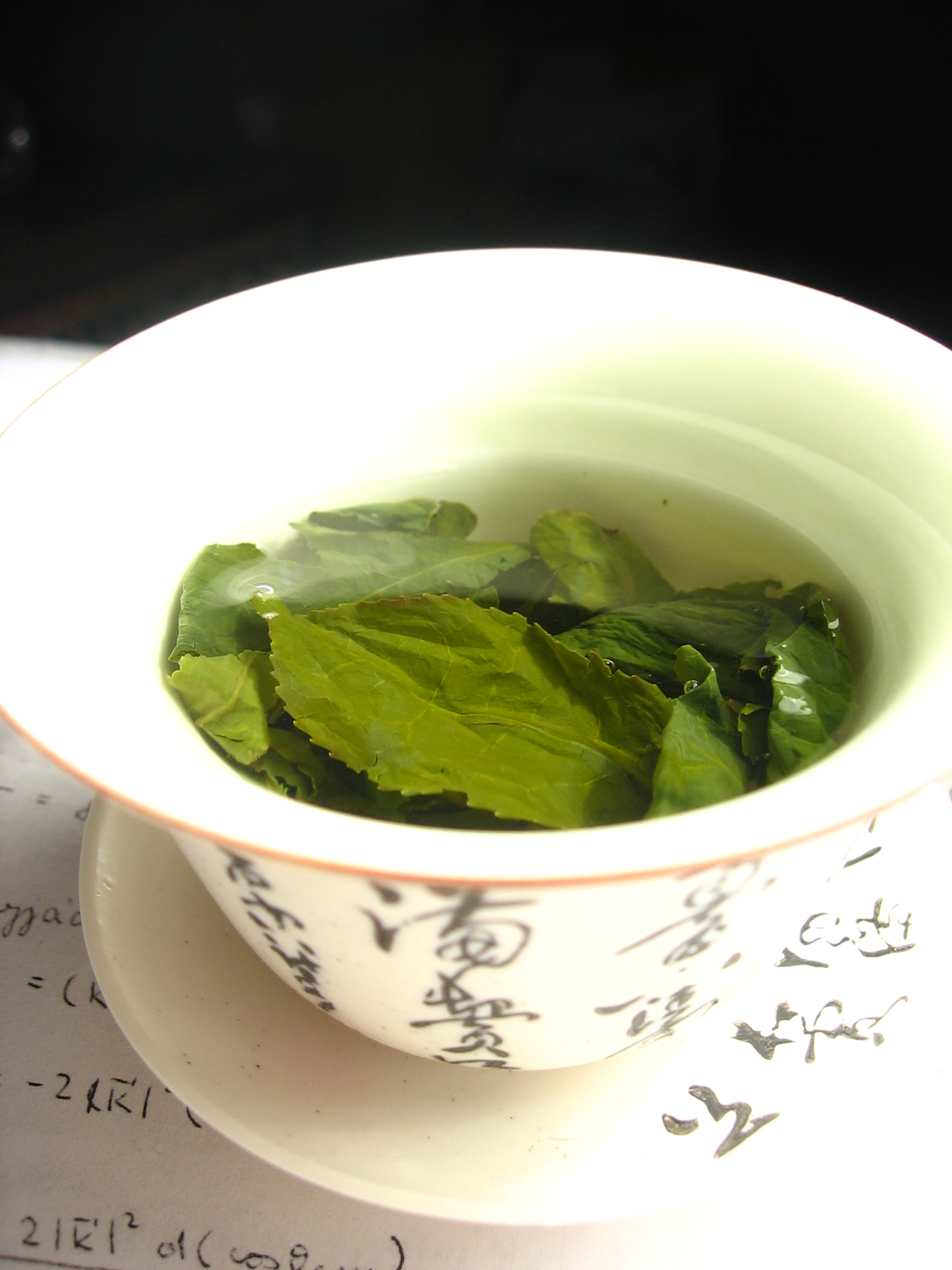
Green tea steeping in a gaiwan

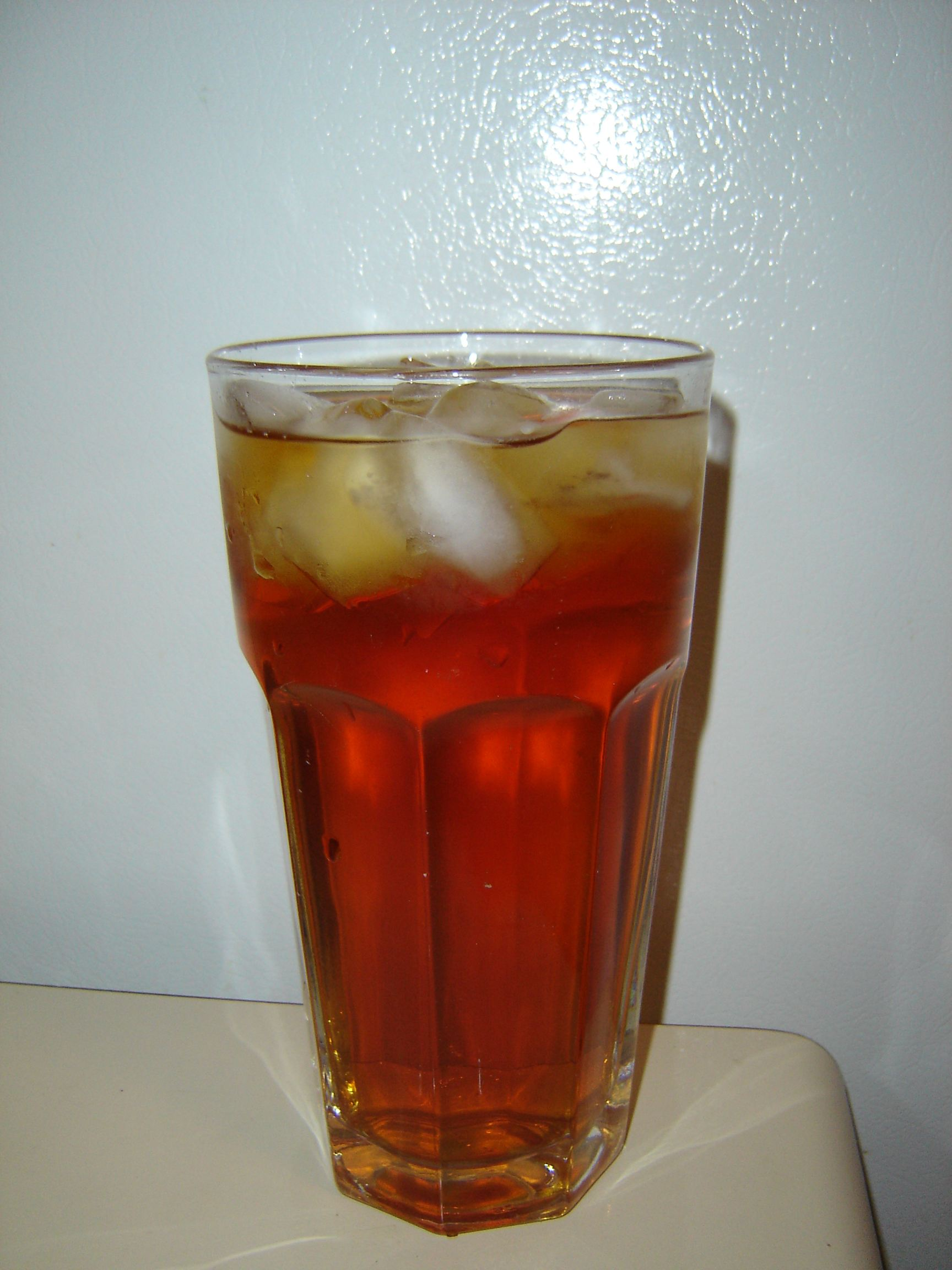
A glass of iced tea

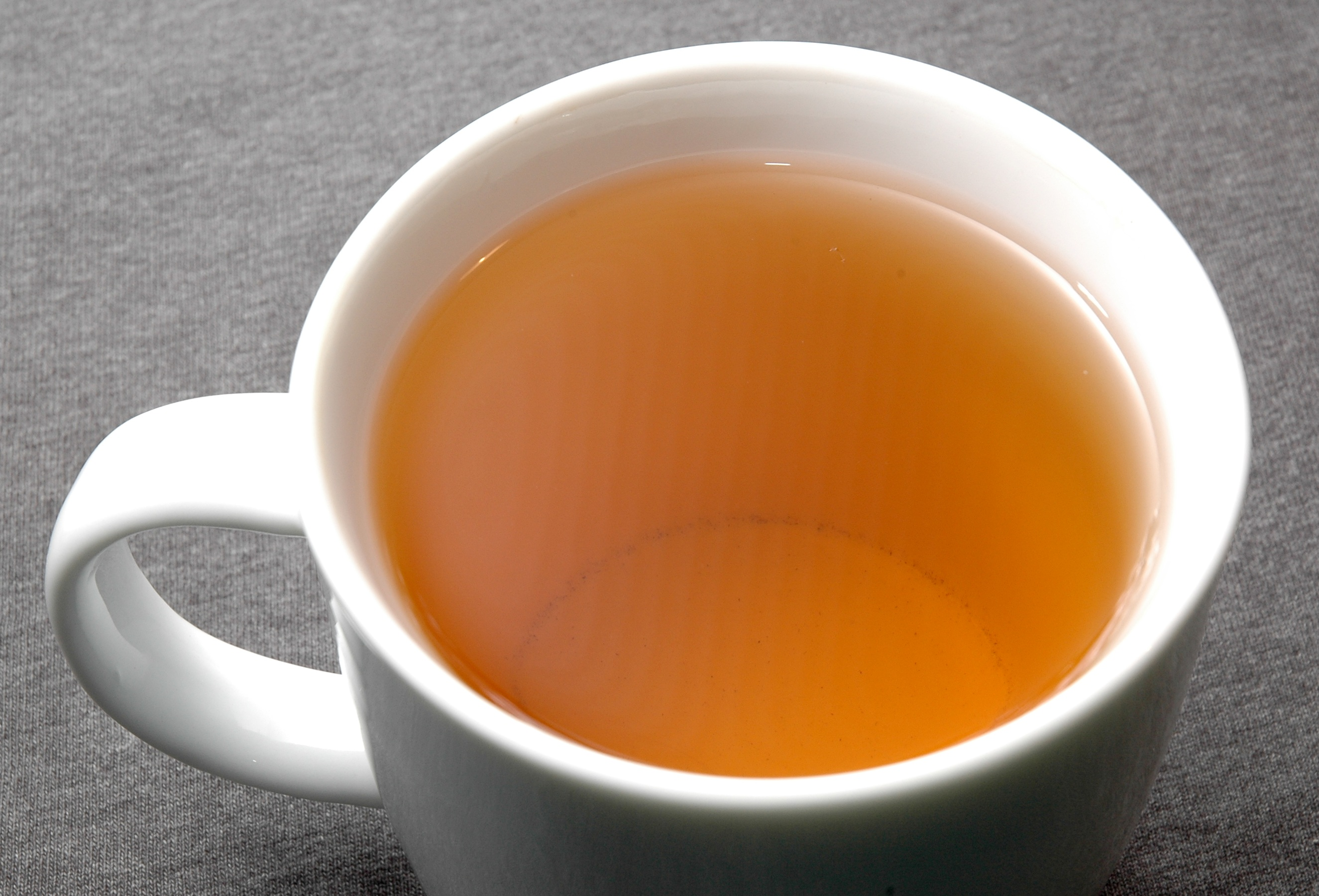
First flush Darjeeling tea in cup

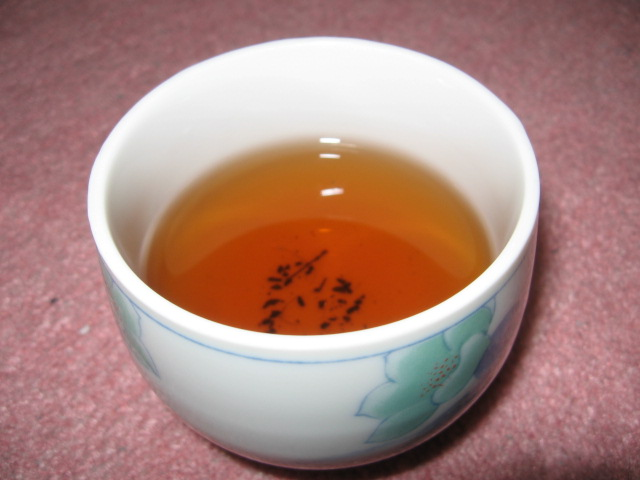
A cup of Japanese hojicha

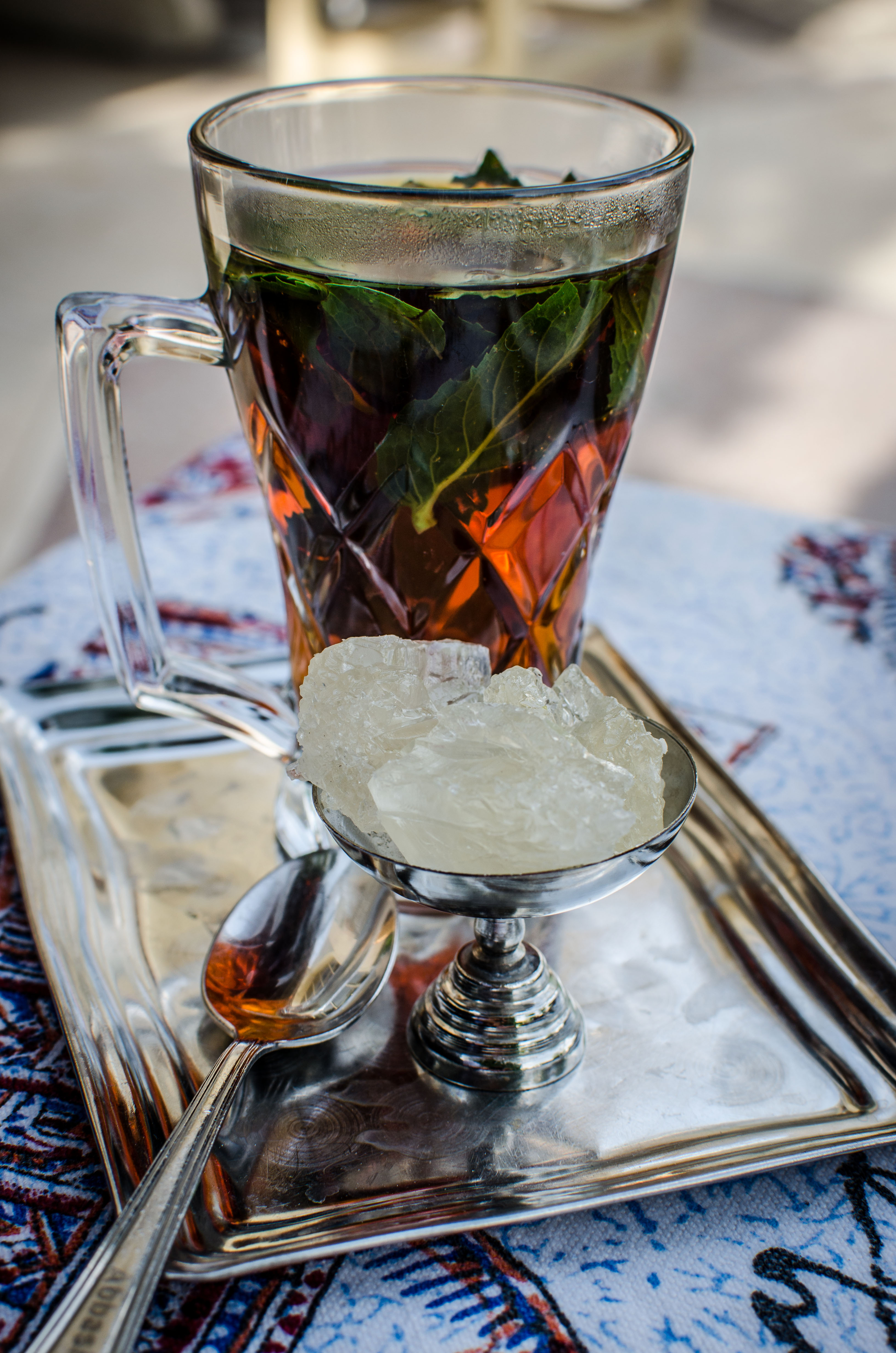
Mint tea in Isfahan

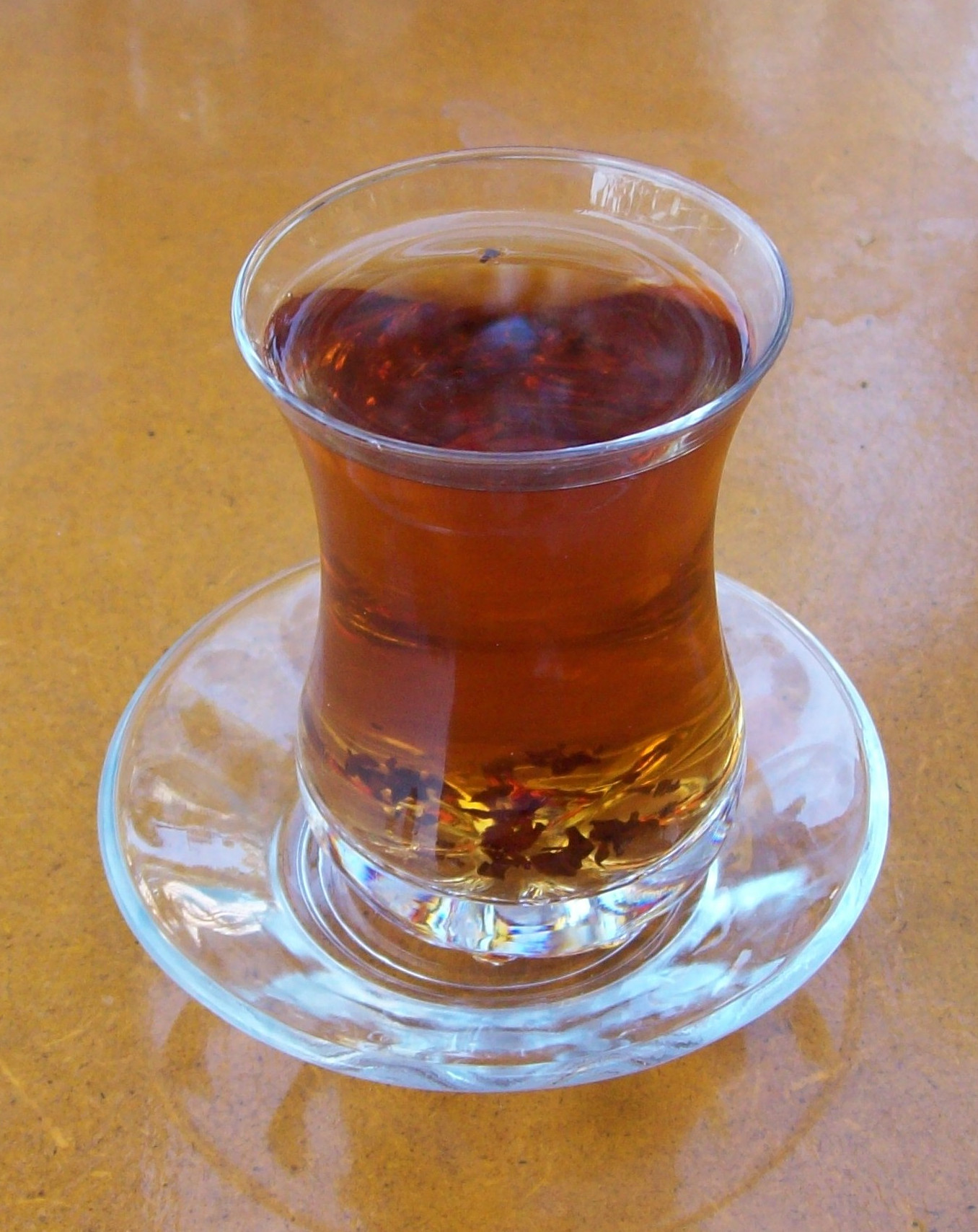
Tea in Azerbaijani armudu (pear-shaped) glass

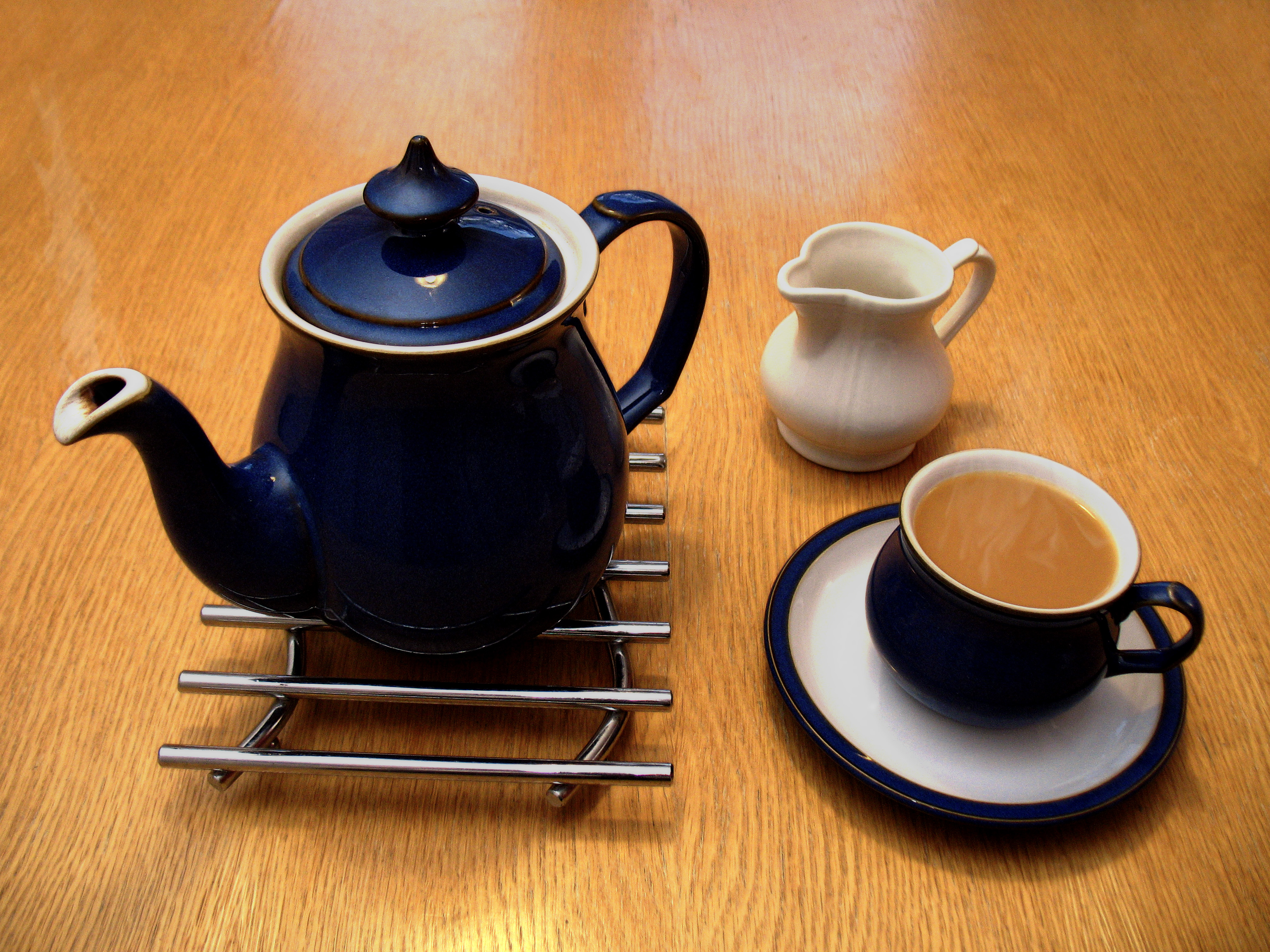
British teapot with a milk jug and full teacup

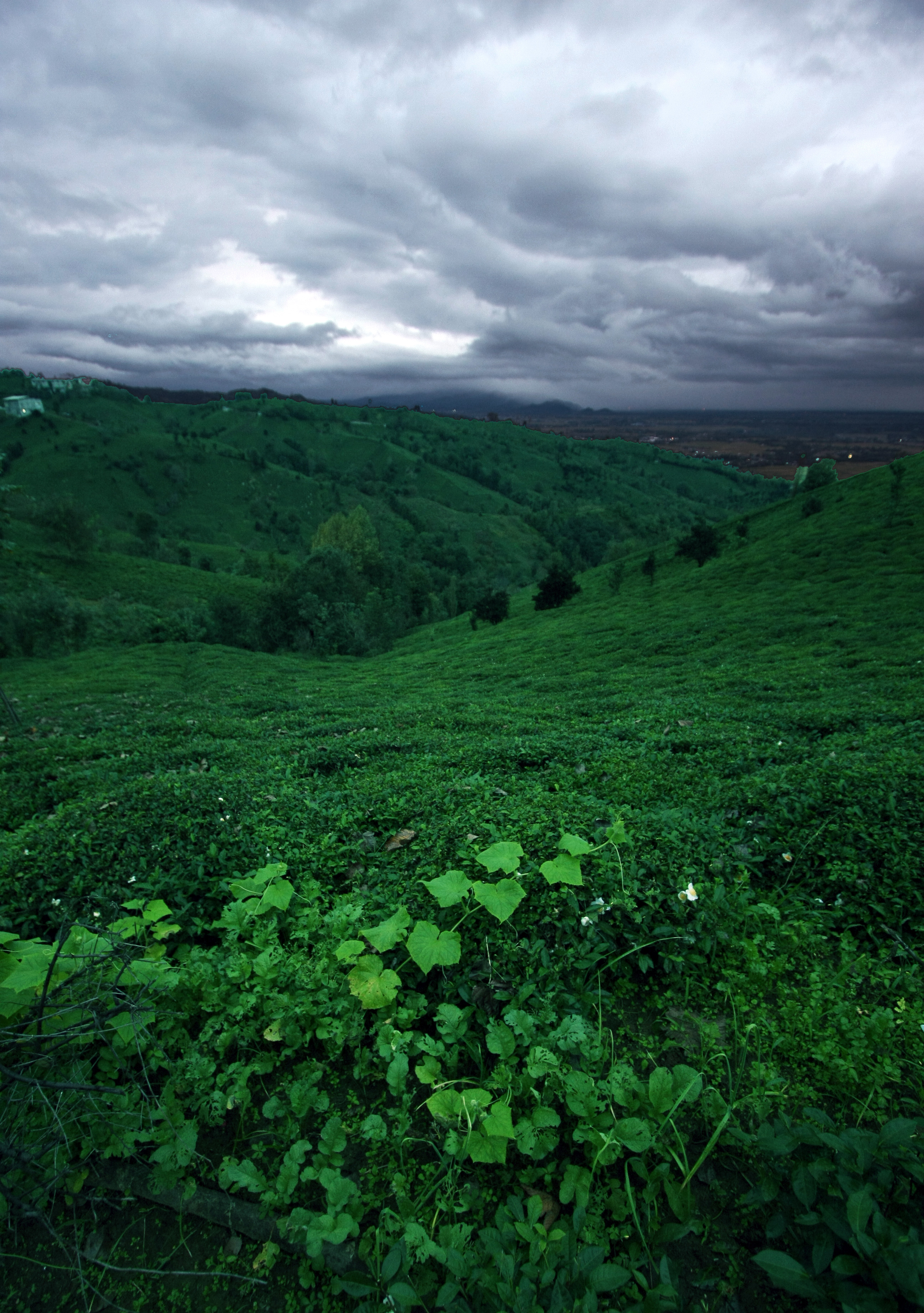
Tea plantation in Gilan, Iran

== See also ==
- List of countries by alcohol consumption per capita
- List of countries by milk consumption per capita
