= Tea in Turkey =

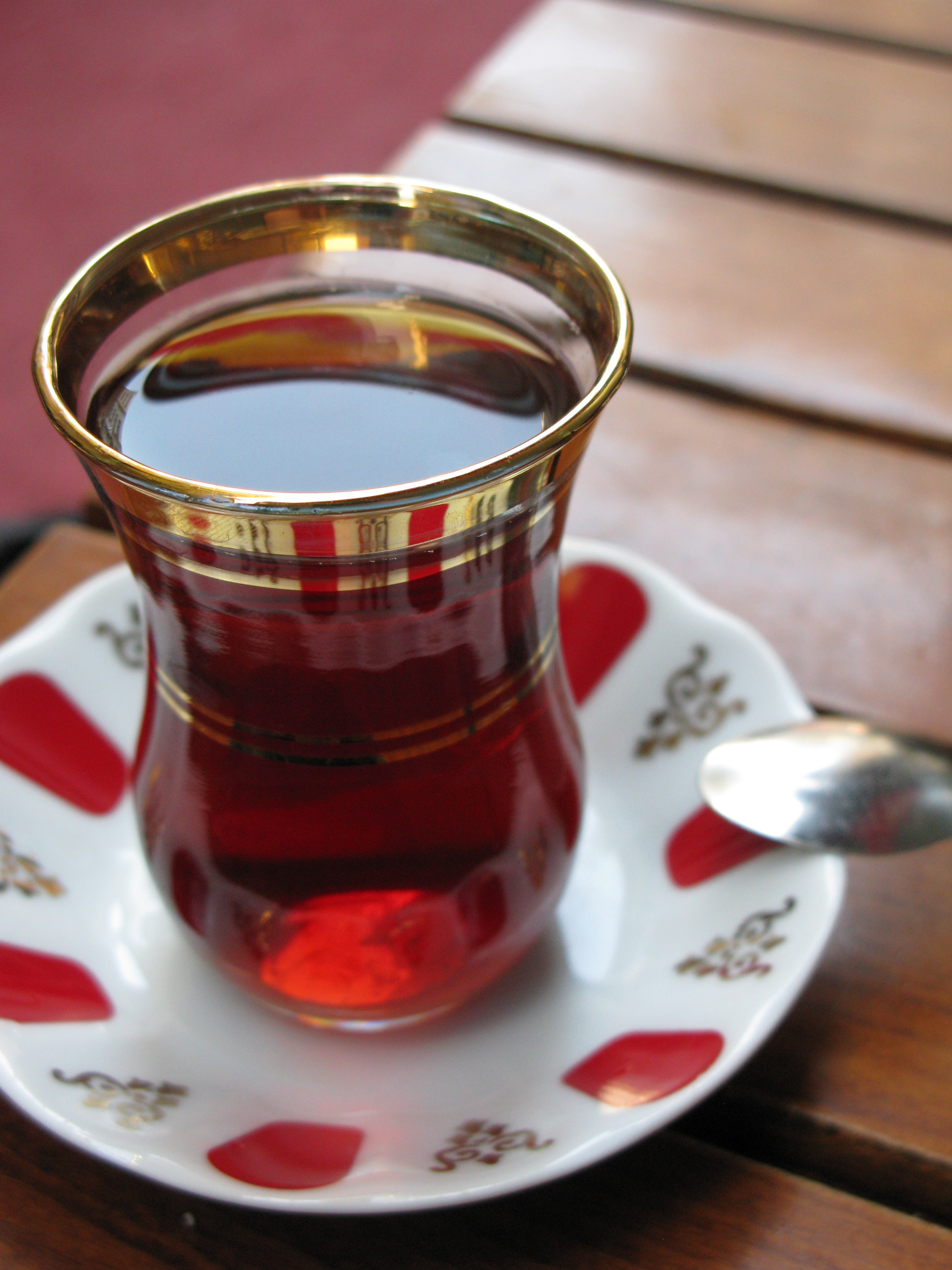
Turkish tea served in the customary way, in a tulip-shaped glass called ince belli.

Tea (Turkish: çay pronounced [tʃaj]) is a popular drink throughout Turkey and the Turkish diaspora. Turkey has the highest per-capita tea consumption in the world with an annual total consumption of over 3 kilograms per person. Turkey is a major exporter of tea, ranking fifth among the top exporting countries. Tea plays a big role in social gatherings that take place in tea houses and gardens. It is also used as a herbal medicine. Turkish tea culture extends to Northern Cyprus and some countries in the Balkan Peninsula. Turkish tea has a long and expansive history that shaped its harvesting even before the founding of the modern Turkish Republic. Since its introduction to Turkey, tea has become a large part of Turkish culture.

== Domestic production ==
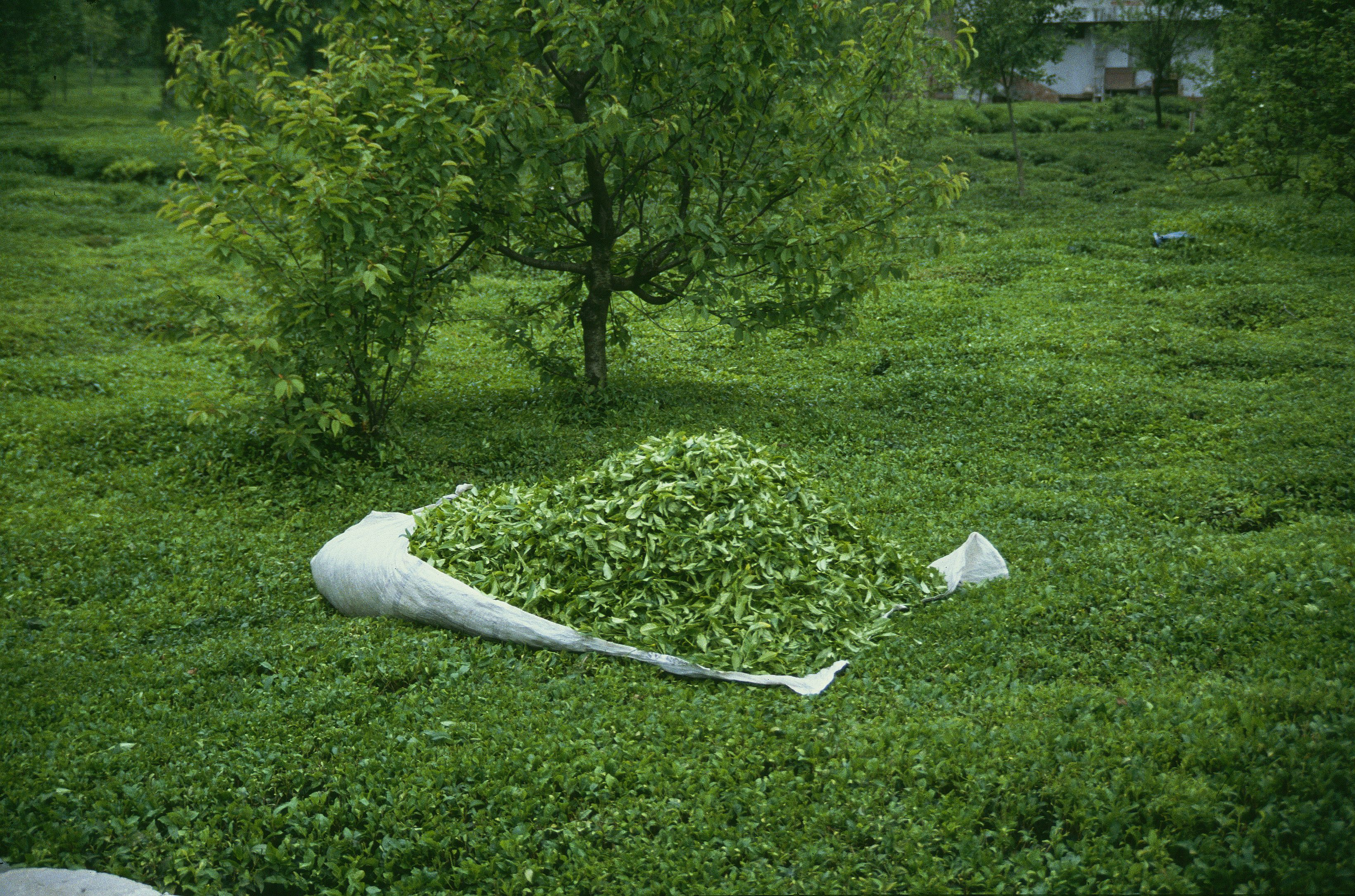
Tea harvest

Since the mid-20th century, most of the tea produced in Turkey has been Rize tea, a terroir from Rize Province on the Eastern Black Sea coast. Rize has a mild climate with high precipitation and fertile soil.

In 2019, Turkey produced 1.45 million tonnes of tea (4% of the world's tea), and was one of the largest tea markets in the world, with 1.26 million tonnes consumed in Turkey and the rest exported. Turks drink the most tea per person at 3.16 kg each a year, or almost four glasses a day. Turkey has high import tariffs on tea, roughly 145%, which help maintain the domestic market for locally produced teas.

However, by 2023, production had fallen to just over 500,000 tonnes due to high temperatures and irregular rainfall.

== History ==
=== Pre-history of tea in Turkey ===
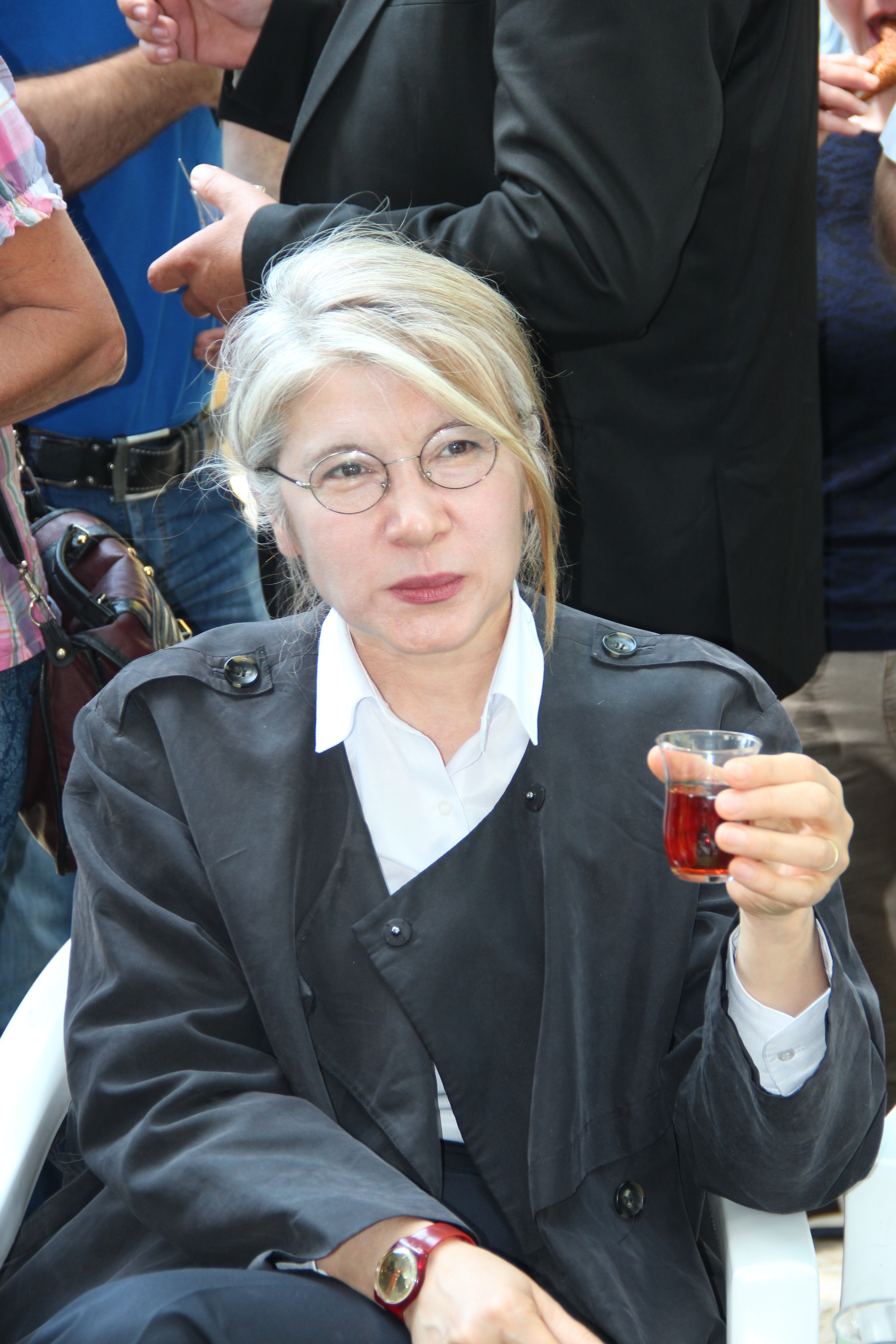
Former Turkish MP Emine Ülker Tarhan drinking Turkish tea

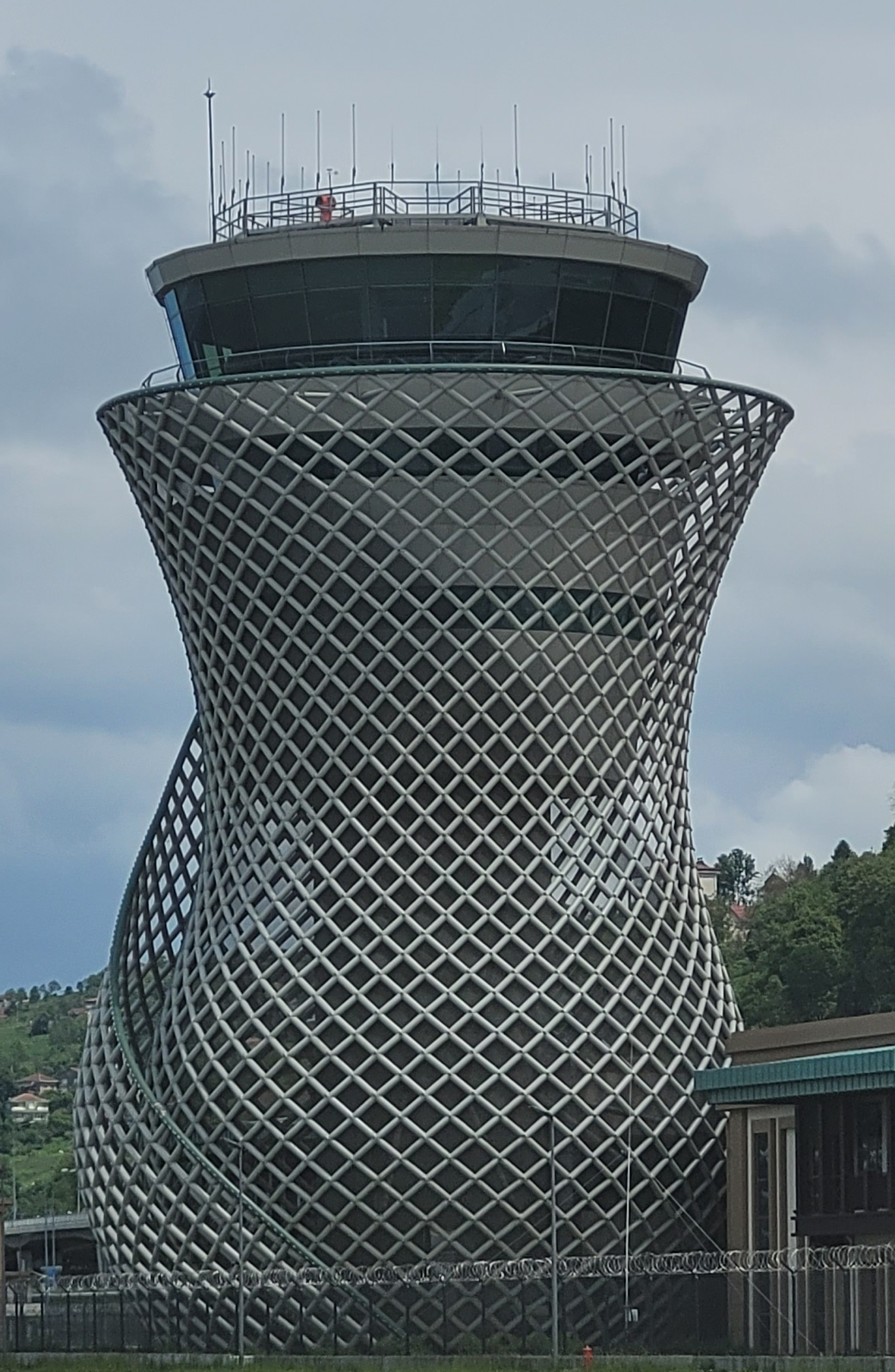
Rize Artvin Airport air traffic control tower inspired by the traditional Turkish tea glass

In the latter part of the 19th century, the nearby city of Batum, in what was then known as the Caucasus Viceroyalty (now known as Batumi, Georgia), was cultivating tea with great success. This commercial growing region in Georgia was established by Russians who imported tea seedlings from China. Following this success, the Russians looked towards Turkey to expand the crop.

Under the direction of the state and leaders, the Department of Agriculture selected the city of Bursa in order to evaluate the feasibility of tea cultivation by importing seedlings from Japan and China in 1888. There were issues with the growing of tea crops in Bursa as the land was found to be unsuitable for this crop.

=== 1900s ===
Tea drinking was initially encouraged as an alternative to coffee after the dissolution of the Ottoman Empire. Coffee had become expensive and, at times, unavailable in the aftermath of World War I. Upon the loss of Yemen Vilayet, where coffee was traditionally cultivated, coffee became an expensive import. Early tea cultivation experiments started in Rize Province in 1912, as an initiative by the Head of the Chamber of Agriculture, Hulusi Bey.

In 1918, botanist Ali Riza Erten was given government instruction to try tea cultivation in other regions of Turkey (including Rize Province, Artvin Province, Ardahan Province, and in Batumi in Georgia). He took detailed notes on the ecological factors that made for successful tea crops in Batumi and tried to find similar features in Turkey in his paper titled, Şimali Şarki Anadolu ve Kafkasyada Tetkikatı Ziraiye (Agricultural Investigations in North Eastern Anatolia and the Caucasus). Erten eventually narrowed production down to the provinces of Rize, Artvin and Ardahan. However, during this time Turkey and its neighboring countries were in turmoil, and tea cultivation was not a priority. Much of this research by Erten on tea cultivation was not used for another 10 years.

By 1924, the government established the Central Tea Nursery (Turkish: Merkez Çay Fidanlığı) to distribute approximately 50,000 seedlings in the province of Rize. Research was conducted after Turkish tea plantations were formed to understand topics such as specific pruning techniques, plant fertilization needs, the shorter required timing for processing tea leaves. Many of the early tea farmers of this region stopped producing the crop as a result of a lack of knowledge and initial profitability. There were many failed attempts to scale these efforts.

From 1939 to 1945, the earliest large-scale crops were created and stabilized. Rize Province soon emerged as Turkey's main tea-producing region, with tea becoming one of the most important agricultural products in the country. Attesting to its importance, some towns in the Black Sea region changed their names so as to include the word çay (tea), such as the towns of Kadahor and Mapavri, which became, respectively, Çaykara and Çayeli.

By the mid-20th century, tea became the beverage of choice in Turkey.

During the 1950s, the central authorities in government recognized the tea sector's transformative potential for the Black Sea province. In order to boost this new sector and improve the living conditions of this province with traditionally below-par circumstances, the government strongly supported this industry. Ironically, Adnan Menderes and his Democrat Party—which stressed the importance of a free-market economy—used protectionism to help shore up the tea sector. The Democrat Party's central agenda was the modernization of Turkey. As the tea sector became more prosperous, so did the North Anatolian province with the construction of highways, schools, hospitals, and important infrastructure.

Party competition in the 1970s curbed tea production as well as the modernization process. This struggle between politicians increased the inflation rates, which caused a decline in commodity prices, such as that of tea. The decline in prices and a growing resentment towards the government led to many growers forgoing the quality controls placed by the Tea Corporation. The Tea Corporation was the state-owned monopoly that was the primary buyer of tea leaves. To ensure a satisfactory quality for exporting tea, the Corporation laid out standards for tea harvesting. The inspectors of the Corporation, many of whom were also producers themselves, often overlooked these regulations as they were aware of the significance of the declining incomes. The drop in the quality of tea was noticeable to the Turkish people at large.

The 1980 coup, which brought a strong central government, also shifted tea production and its regulations heavily. Producers were instructed to follow the quality standards set by the Tea Corporation. Instructions such as plucking only by hand and limiting daily quotas resulted in a drop in production. The 1983 elections brought the Motherland Party. Soon after, the Tea Corporation's monopoly over the tea sector was lifted. Private companies were now able to enter the tea sector. The entrance of the private sector into the tea industry was welcomed by the producers, as many small-scale private companies disregarded the quality controls in comparison to the Corporation. Even with the entrance of new companies into the sector, the Tea Corporation remained dominant. The enthusiasm regarding the entrance of the private sector into the industry was not long-lived. Many companies either went bankrupt or were slow to pay their harvesters. Workers went back to selling to the Corporation as they found it to be more trustworthy—especially regarding payments.

After the 1991 elections, in which the Motherland Party was voted out of office, the new government sought to use the Tea Corporation to its benefit. The new coalition government added more jobs to the tea sector to increase its support.

== Economics ==
In 2018, Germany was the top importer of Turkish tea. Between January and August, Turkey generated a profit of approximately 770,000 U.S. dollars from exporting tea to Germany. Turkey exported nearly 1,500 tonnes of its domestic tea in 2018. The amount of tea exported in 2018 was valued at 5.7 million U.S. dollars. As of 2017, Turkey ranks as the fifth-largest exporter of tea in the world.

=== Impact of COVID-19 ===
As a result of the COVID-19 pandemic, the Black Sea province witnessed a change in the demographics of the workers during the tea-harvesting season. The 40,000 workers, traditionally from the Caucasus, such as fro, Georgia and Azerbaijan, who were anticipating harvesting tea, were not let in the country due to the pandemic. This void was filled by African immigrants, primarily from Gambia and Senegal, who had been residing in Turkey with a visa.

The government “eased domestic travel restrictions” for harvesters of tea to travel to the Rize province. The harvesters were mandated to quarantine for 14 days before beginning work.

== Politics of tea ==
During the summer of 2021, widespread wildfires occurred in Turkey that left many displaced, homeless, and injured. As part of the response to the fires, the president, Recep Tayyip Erdogan, and his party threw teabags from a moving vehicle in one of the affected provinces. The government faced criticism due to the way it handled this crisis.

== Tea drinking ritual ==
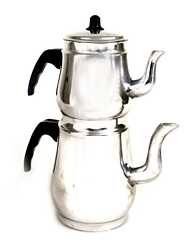
Aluminium çaydanlık

Turkish tea is typically prepared using two stacked teapots called "çaydanlık" specifically designed for tea preparation. Water is brought to a boil in the larger, lower teapot and then some of the water is used to fill the smaller teapot on top and steep (infuse) several spoonfuls of loose tea leaves, producing tea with a strong flavor. When served, the remaining water is used to dilute the tea on an individual basis, giving each consumer the choice between strong (Turkish: koyu, literally "dark") and weak (Turkish: açık, literally "light").

Tea is drunk from small, tulip-shaped glasses called ince belli (literally "slim-waisted"), which allows the tea to be enjoyed hot as well as showing its crimson color. Istanbul is home to a prosperous glass-blowing industry where these traditional tea glasses are produced. Around 400 million of these tea glasses are sold each year in Turkey. They are usually held by the rim to prevent the drinker's fingertips from being scorched, as the tea is served boiling hot.

Traditionally, tea is served with small cubes of beet sugar. It is almost never taken with milk or lemon. Sweet or savory biscuits called kurabiye are usually served with tea during teatime (usually between three and five in the afternoon), though tea-drinking is not limited to these hours.

Tea is an important part of Turkish culture and is the most commonly consumed hot drink, despite the country's long history of coffee consumption. Offering tea to guests is part of Turkish hospitality. Tea is most often consumed in households, shops, and kıraathane (social gatherings of men).

=== Tea houses and gardens ===
Aside from the traditional kiraathane (tea houses primarily for men), tea gardens are also settings in which social gatherings with tea take place. Backgammon is a common game that is often played in these tea gardens. They have proven to be an attraction for tourists in destinations such as Sultan Ahmet and Taksim in Istanbul. With the growing young population, Turkey is seeing a shift towards café culture in places like Karaköy where coffee is predominantly consumed. However, this increase in the consumption of coffee does not negate the fact that black Turkish tea is still the drink of choice for Turks.

== Turkish herbal teas ==
In Turkey, herbal teas are generally used as herbal medication. Many of the herbal medicinal treatments have not been proven by science but have existed in folk medicine. In Turkey, herbal teas destined for the treatment of most ailments can be found in local herbal shops, called aktar.

The most popular herbal teas consumed by foreign tourists are apple (elma çayı), rose hip (kuşburnu çayı), and linden flower (ıhlamur çayı).

=== Apple tea ===
Apple tea (elma çayı) has been used in Turkey to treat digestive problems, balance blood sugar, boost the immune system, improve coughs with its expectorant properties, and improve eye health.

=== Yarrow tea ===
Yarrow tea has been medicinally used in Turkey as an anti-inflammatory and anti-microbial treatment. Modern medical studies have been conducted on Yarrow tea to determine the health benefits. A 2014 study by Demirel, et al. concluded that yarrow (specifically the species Achillea biebersteinii Afan.) is a "promising alternative for the treatment of endometriosis".

=== Sage teas ===
Sage tea (Turkish: ada çayı; literally 'island tea') is popular in the Mediterranean coastal region. Whereas in English "sage" usually refers to the species Salvia officinalis, throughout Turkey various species of the plant genera Salvia, Sideritis, and very rarely Stachys, are usually known and consumed as "sage tea". Sideritis (also known as ironwort, mountain tea, or shepherd's tea; Turkish: dağ çayı) is used medicinally and grows at high elevations. Sideritis is often served with honey, lemon, or cinnamon.

== See also ==
- Samovar
- Ayran
- Turkish coffee
- Salep
- Boza
