= Rize Castle =

- Rize Kalesi
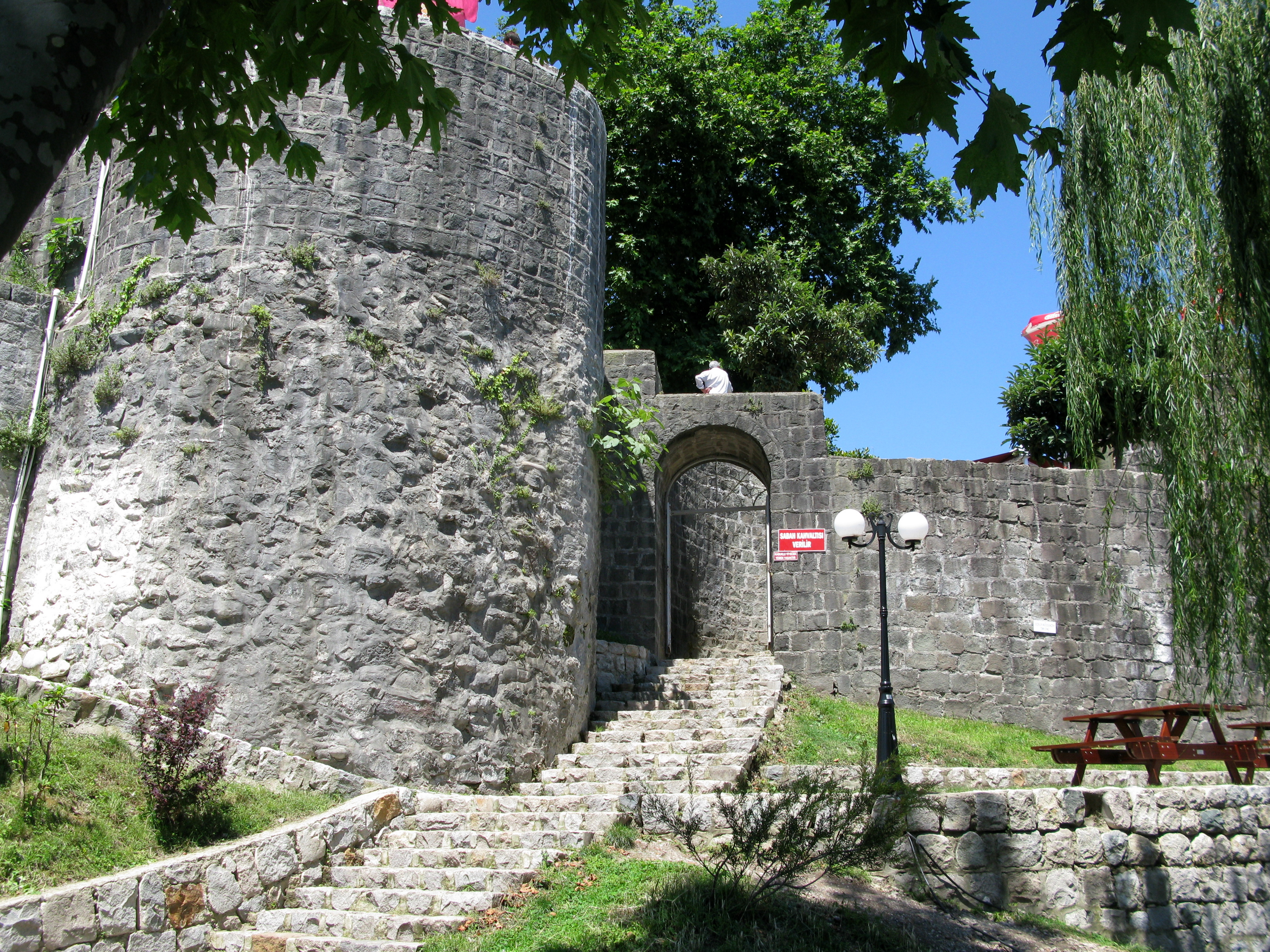
- A gate of Rize Castle

- Location within Turkey

General information
- Type: Castle
- Location: Rize, Turkey
- Coordinates: 41.02788°N 40.51010°E
- Completed: 6th and 13th century

Rize Castle (Turkish: Rize Kalesi) is a partly-ruined medieval castle located in Rize, northeastern Turkey.

Rize Castle is situated on a hill southwest of the city center, and offers a panoramic view of the city.

The castle consists of a citadel and the lower castle. It is believed that the citadel was built during the reign of Byzantine emperor Justinian I (r. 527–565), and the lower castle dates back to the 13th century.

It covers an area of 480 m^{2} (5,200 sq ft). The fortification's walls, built in ashlar and mortar, are 2–20 m (6.6–65.6 ft) high and 2–3 m (6.6–9.8 ft) thick. Between the cylinder-formed bastions, there are overhung support towers in various forms such as square, rectangular and round.

Today, some of the ruined castle walls are buried under reinforced concrete buildings and streets. The castle walls in the southern part were restored in 1989. The Ministry of Culture and Tourism launched a project for the restoration of Rize Castle in 2011.
