= Çaykur =

Turkish state-owned tea-producing company

- Company type: Public
- Industry: Tea producer
- Founded: 1983; 43 years ago
- Headquarters: Rize, Turkey
- Key people: CEO: İmdat Sütlüoğlu
- Revenue: ▲ ₺14.900 billion (2023)
- Operating income: ▲ ₺1.390 billion (2023)
- Net income: ▲ ₺69.2 million (2023)
- Total assets: ▲ ₺18.231 billion (2023)
- Total equity: ▲ ₺10.810 billion (2023)
- Owner: Turkey Wealth Fund
- Number of employees: 26,500 (2016)
- Website: www.caykur.gov.tr

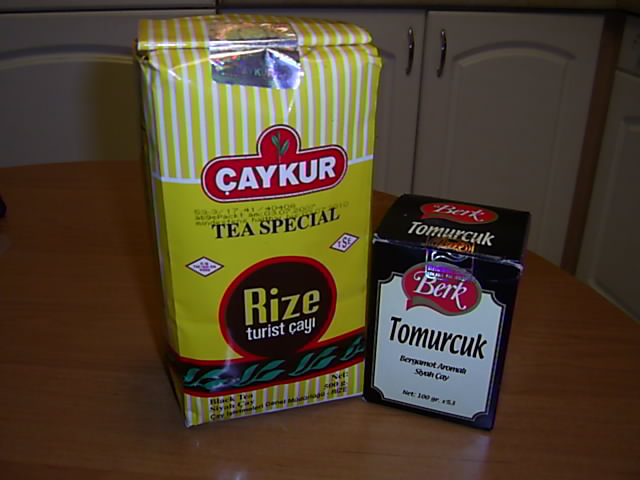
The pack on the left is Çaykur "tourist" Rize tea

Çaykur is a Turkish state-owned tea-producing company. Their portfolio includes ice tea, green tea, organic and black tea. Çaykur has 45 tea processing factories, and one packaging factory. The general manager of Çaykur is Yusuf Ziya Alim.

Tea production was also supported by the Republic of Turkey in the following years. The first tea crop was harvested in 1938 and the first tea factory was established in 1947. Since 1963, domestic production has replaced imports in meeting Turkey's tea consumption. Tea production activities were carried out by the State Agricultural Enterprises until 1948, and in cooperation with the General Directorate of Tekel and the Ministry of Agriculture between 1949 and 1973.

On 4 February 2017, all state-owned stakes were handed over to the Turkey Wealth Fund.

The firm is a sponsor of Çaykur Rizespor football club.
