= Rize Ziraat Botanical Garden =

Botanical garden

Coordinates: 41°01′15″N 40°30′38″E

Rize Ziraat Botanical Garden, also known as Rize Botanical Park or Rize Ziraat Tea Garden, is a botanical garden located 2 kilometers southwest of Rize, Turkey. In addition to plants native to Rize, the botanical garden features species from different parts of Turkey that have adapted to Rize's climate.

== History ==
The botanical garden was established on land formerly known as Garal Mountain. It was founded in 1924 as a tea and citrus nursery under the supervision of Zihni Derin and gardener Emil Vlakov, whom Derin brought from Batumi. The garden was initially built on 15 decares of land. The first plants cultivated in the garden included tea saplings, mandarin orange, lemon, orange, grapefruit, citron, and bamboo. Additionally, ornamental flowers such as mimosa, imported by Zihni Derin from Batumi, were introduced to the garden. The successful cultivation of tea plants in this garden confirmed Rize's suitability for tea production.

== Facilities ==
The facility covers an area of 250 square meters and includes a tea factory where visitors can observe tea processing, a viewing terrace, a children's park, a traditional nayla (storage structure), the Atatürk Tea and Horticultural Research Institute, a 200-square-meter tea sales shop, and a restaurant called Çayla. Additionally, the site includes a 500-square-meter parking area. Renovations in 2022 introduced stone walls made of Rize's distinctive black stones, a bust of Zihni Derin, and old-style fountains from Rize.

== Transportation ==
The botanical garden is accessible via Zihni Derin Street. Municipal buses and minibuses provide transportation to the facility.
