= Rize tea =

Black tea variety from Turkey

Rize Tea
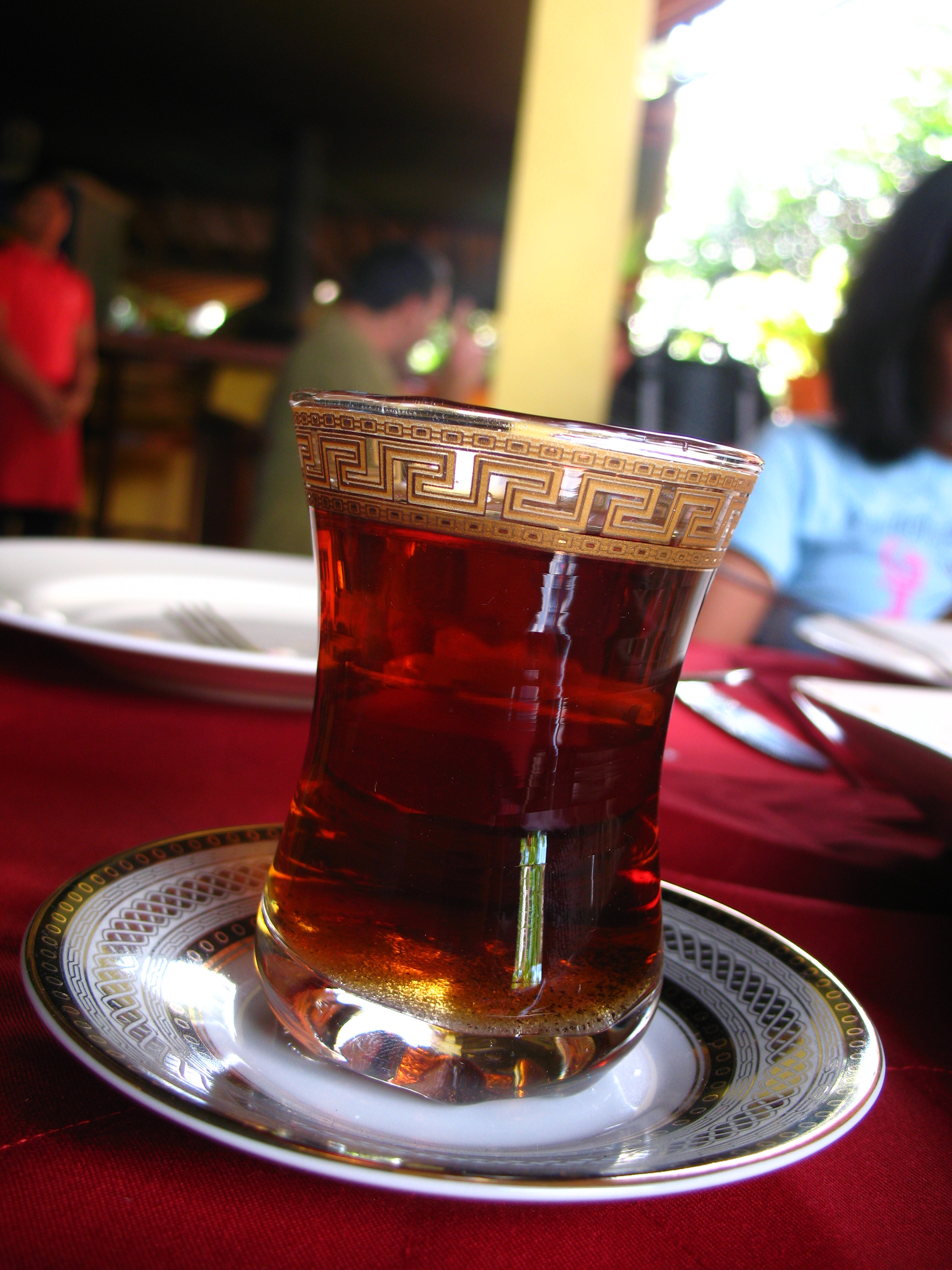
- Type: Black
- Other names: Rize çayı, Çay
- Origin: Rize Province, Turkey
- Quick description: Turkish tea produced in the eastern Black Sea province of Rize

Rize tea (Turkish: Rize çayı) is the black tea used for Turkish tea. Produced in Rize Province of Turkey which has a mild climate with high precipitation and fertile soil, when brewed it is mahogany in color.

In addition to being consumed at home, it is served in Turkish cafés by a çaycı, in small, narrow-waisted glasses. It can be taken strong (Turkish: demli or dark) or weak (Turkish: açık or light), and is traditionally served with sugar crystals (Turkish: toz şeker) or a couple of sugar lumps (Turkish: kesme şeker), although it is frequently consumed without any sugar, depending on personal preference.

== History ==
Rize Province is located between the Pontic Mountains and the Black Sea, and is considered to be the "wettest" corner of Turkey; this environment provides a specific ecosystem for tea growing. The land contains many mountain valleys and has been prized for its biodiversity.

Tea was experimentally farmed in the Rize Province, starting in 1912 as an initiative by the Head of the Chamber of Agriculture, Hulusi Bey. But it was not until around 1945, that Turkish tea plantations in Rize Province were producing sizable crops. There are other regions of tea growing within Turkey, with Rize Province being one of the largest and more successful. By 1947, the first local tea factory was created and by 1958, the first regional tea research institute was created in Rize Province.

== Labor ==
The success of tea crops in Rize brought work and wealth to a once impoverished area, as well as a large population change. Modern day harvesting of Rize tea crops has been done by migrant laborers, especially people from the Caucasian countries of Georgia and Azerbaijan. In 2021, the tea plantations were expecting 40,000 foreign workers during the harvest season however due to the COVID-19 pandemic travel restrictions, African laborers came to the region to work instead (specifically from Gambia, Senegal, Sudan and Zambia).

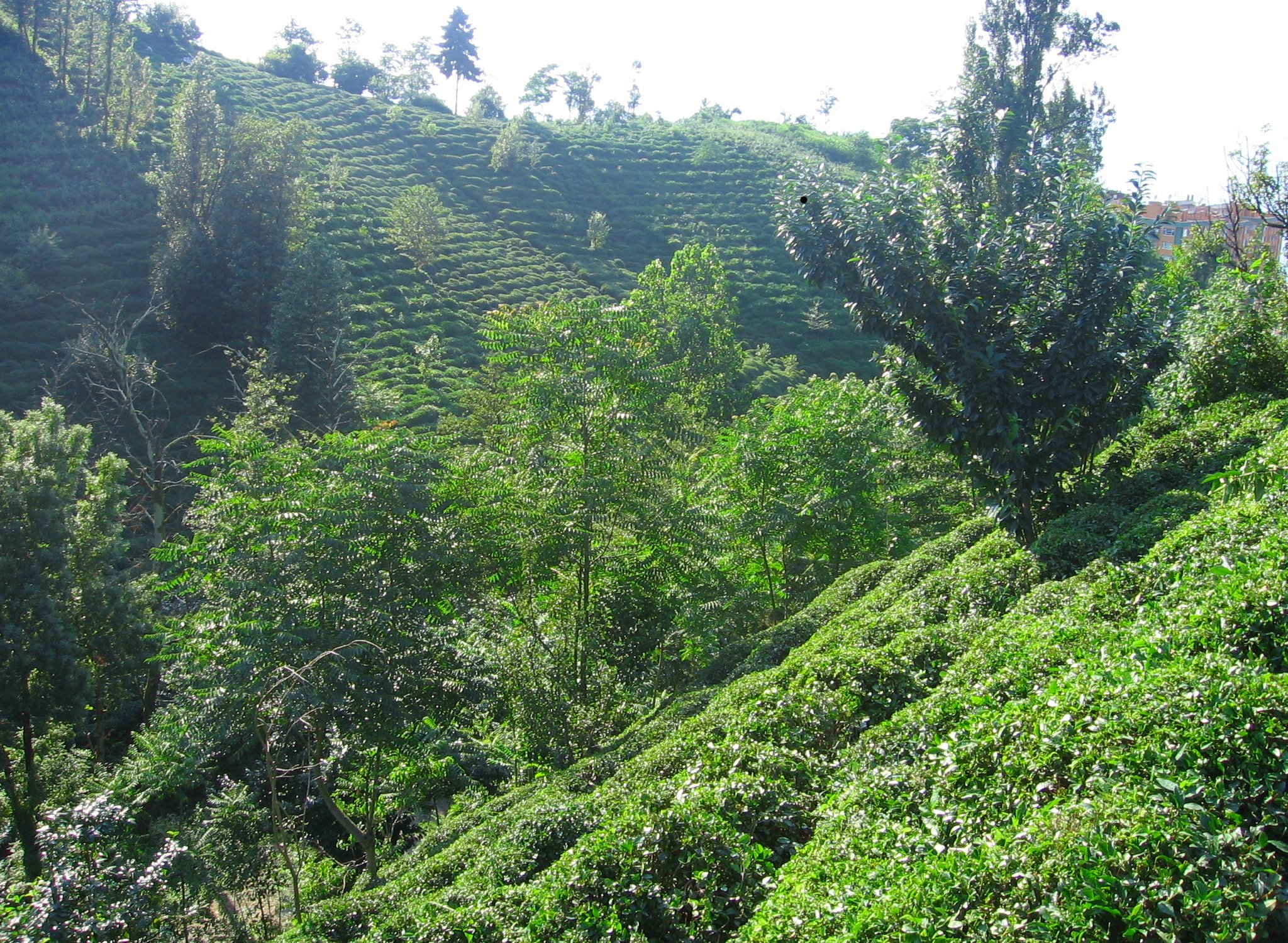
Tea plantation in Rize

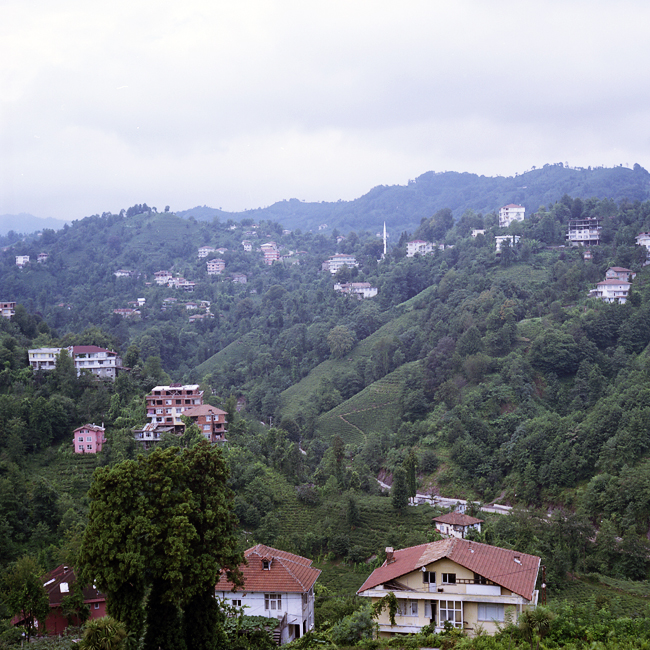
Tea plantation in Rize
