= Arılı, Fındıklı =

Arılı Tsaleni Pitsxala (Laz language)
- Village
- Location in Turkey
- Coordinates: 41.2094°N 41.1688°E
- Country: Turkey
- Province: Rize
- District: Fındıklı
- Elevation: 252 m (827 ft)
- Population (2021): 336
- Time zone: UTC+3 (TRT)

Arılı is a village in the Fındıklı District, Rize Province, in Black Sea Region of Turkey. Its population is 336 (2021).

== History ==
According to list of villages in Laz language book (2009), name of the village is Tsaleni Pitsxala, which means "upper Pitsxala". Most villagers are ethnically Laz.

== Geography ==
The village is located 9 kilometres (5.6 mi) away from Fındıklı.
