= Karaali, Fındıklı =

Karaali Karalishiavla (Laz language)
- Village
- Country: Turkey
- Province: Rize
- District: Fındıklı
- Elevation: 252 m (827 ft)
- Population (2021): 40
- Time zone: UTC+3 (TRT)

Karaali is a village in the Fındıklı District, Rize Province, in Black Sea Region of Turkey. Its population is 40 (2021).

== History ==
According to list of villages in Laz language book (2009), name of the village is Karalishiavla, which means "Karali village". Karaali was part of Meyvalı village.

== Geography ==
The village lies to the 10 kilometres (6.2 mi) away from Fındıklı.
