= Gürsu, Fındıklı =

Gürsu Jileni Pitsxala (Laz language)
- Village
- Country: Turkey
- Province: Rize
- District: Fındıklı
- Elevation: 304 m (997 ft)
- Population (2021): 119
- Time zone: UTC+3 (TRT)

Gürsu is a village in the Fındıklı District, Rize Province, in Black Sea Region of Turkey. Its population is 119 (2021).

== History ==
According to list of villages in Laz language book (2009), name of the village is Jileni Pitsxala. The name of the village means "upper Pitsxala". Most villagers are ethnically Laz.

== Geography ==
The village is located 11 kilometres (6.8 mi) away from Fındıklı.
