= Altıparmak =

Altıparmak is a Turkish surname. Notable people with the surname include:

- Batur Altıparmak (born 1971), Turkish footballer
- Burak Altıparmak (born 1990), German footballer
- Gökhan Altıparmak (born 2001), Turkish footballer
- Kerem Altiparmak, Turkish professor and activist
- Mehmet Altıparmak (born 1969), Turkish footballer and manager
- Ogün Altıparmak (1938–2025), Turkish footballer
