= Konaktepe, Ardeşen =

Konaktepe Nobaghule (Laz language)
- Neighbourhood
- Location in Turkey
- Coordinates: 41°12′52″N 41°03′25″E
- Country: Turkey
- Province: Rize
- District: Ardeşen
- Municipality: Ardeşen
- Population (2021): 616
- Time zone: UTC+3 (TRT)

Konaktepe is a neighbourhood of the town Ardeşen, Ardeşen District, Rize Province, northeastern Turkey. Its population is 616 (2021).

== History ==
According to list of villages in Laz language book (2009), name of the neighbourhood is Nobaghule. Most inhabitants of the neighbourhood are ethnically Laz.
