= Çağlayan, Fındıklı =

Çağlayan Ab-ı Ulya (Laz language)
- Village
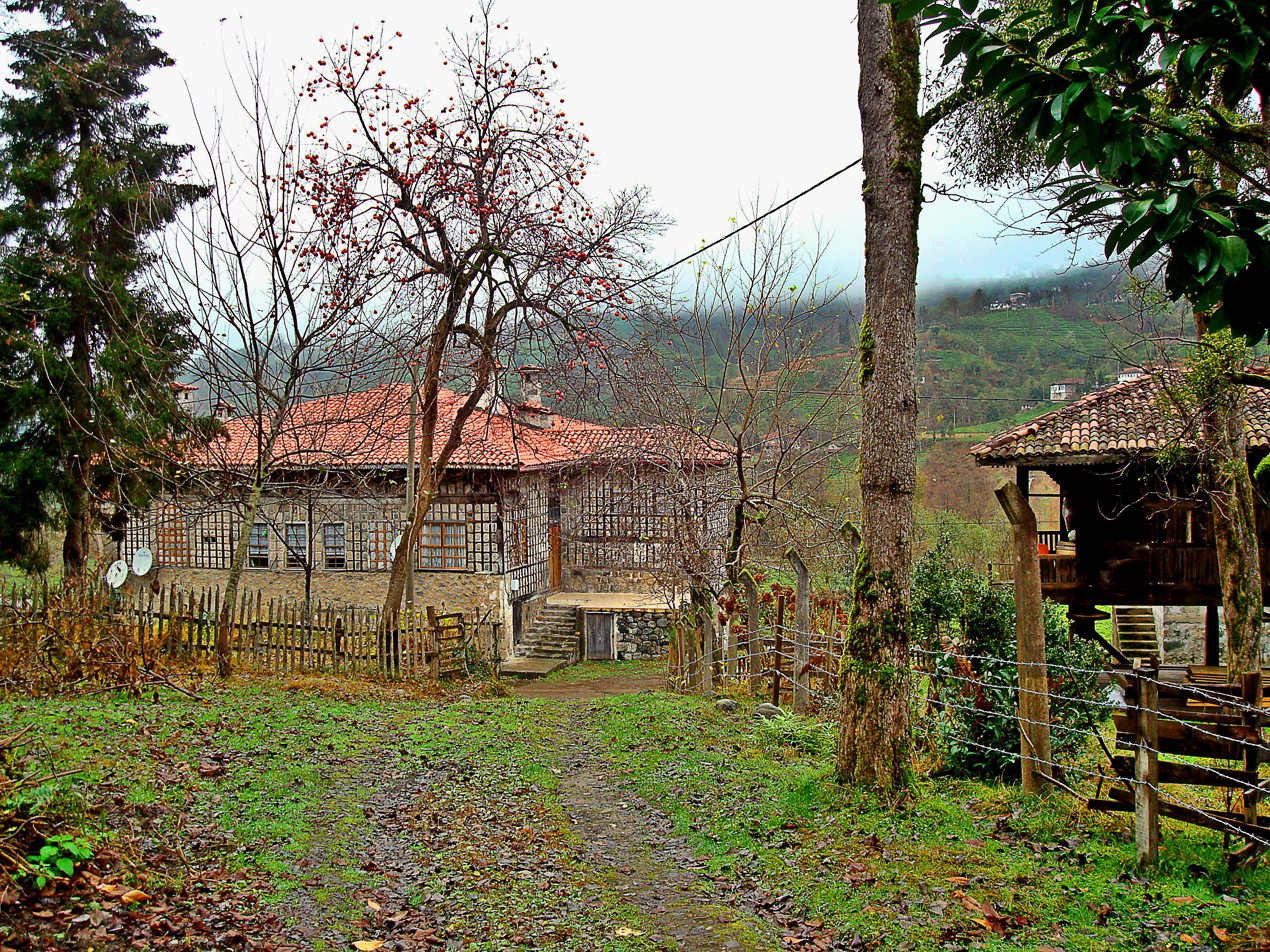
- Village Abu (tr.: Çağlayan), Vitze district (Fındıklı ilçesi), Rize, Lazistan

- Location within Turkey
- Coordinates: 41.2591°N 41.2036°E
- Country: Turkey
- Province: Rize
- District: Fındıklı
- Elevation: 252 m (827 ft)
- Population (2021): 515
- Time zone: UTC+3 (TRT)

Çağlayan is a village in the Fındıklı District, Rize Province, in Black Sea Region of Turkey. Its population is 515 (2021).

== History ==
According to list of villages in Laz language book (2009), name of the village is Ab-ı Ulya, which means "upper stream". Most villagers are ethnically Laz.

== Geography ==
The village is located 6 kilometres (3.7 mi) away from Fındıklı.
