= Yeniköy, Ardeşen =

Yeniköy Maxatoba (Laz language)
- Village
- Country: Turkey
- Province: Rize
- District: Ardeşen
- Elevation: 521 m (1,709 ft)
- Population (2021): 168
- Time zone: UTC+3 (TRT)

Yeniköy is a village in the Ardeşen District, Rize Province, in Black Sea Region of Turkey. Its population is 168 (2021).

== History ==
According to list of villages in Laz language book (2009), name of the village is Maxatoba, which means "north lake". Most villagers are ethnically Laz.

== Geography ==
The village is located 14 kilometres (8.7 mi) away from Ardeşen.
