= Zeytinlik, Ardeşen =

Zeytinlik Mamalaavla (Laz language)
- Village
- Location in Turkey
- Coordinates: 41°10′32″N 40°59′1″E
- Country: Turkey
- Province: Rize
- District: Ardeşen
- Elevation: 252 m (827 ft)
- Population (2021): 159
- Time zone: UTC+3 (TRT)

Zeytinlik is a village in the Ardeşen District, Rize Province, in Black Sea Region of Turkey. Its population is 159 (2021).

== Geography ==
The village is located 3 kilometres (1.9 mi) away from Ardeşen.
