= Elmalık, Ardeşen =

Elmalık Kvanch'areri (Laz language)
- Neighbourhood
- Country: Turkey
- Province: Rize
- District: Ardeşen
- Municipality: Ardeşen
- Population (2021): 708
- Time zone: UTC+3 (TRT)

Elmalık is a neighbourhood of the town Ardeşen, Ardeşen District, Rize Province, northeastern Turkey. Its population is 708 (2021).

== History ==
According to list of villages in Laz language book (2009), name of the neighbourhood is Kvanch'areri, which means "inscribed stone". Most inhabitants of the neighbourhood are ethnically Laz.
