= Ihlamurlu =

Ihlamurlu Ghayna (Laz language)
- Village
- Country: Turkey
- Province: Rize
- District: Fındıklı
- Elevation: 327 m (1,073 ft)
- Population (2021): 390
- Time zone: UTC+3 (TRT)

Ihlamurlu is a village in the Fındıklı District, Rize Province, in Black Sea Region of Turkey. Its population is 390 (2021).

== History ==
According to list of villages in Laz language book (2009), name of the village is Ghayna. Most villagers are ethnically Laz.

== Geography ==
The village is located 12 kilometres (7.5 mi) away from Fındıklı.
