= Çıraklar, Ardeşen =

Çıraklar Bakoz (Laz language)
- Village
- Country: Turkey
- Province: Rize
- District: Ardeşen
- Elevation: 252 m (827 ft)
- Population (2021): 72
- Time zone: UTC+3 (TRT)

Çıraklar is a village in the Ardeşen District, Rize Province, in Black Sea Region of Turkey. Its population is 72 (2021).

== History ==
According to list of villages in Laz language book (2009), name of the village is Bakoz. Most villagers are ethnically Laz.

== Geography ==
The village is located 11 kilometres (6.8 mi) away from Ardeşen.
