= Yamaçdere =

Yamaçdere Bakoz (Laz language)
- Village
- Location in Turkey
- Coordinates: 41°09′14″N 40°59′19″E
- Country: Turkey
- Province: Rize
- District: Ardeşen
- Elevation: 267 m (876 ft)
- Population (2021): 327
- Time zone: UTC+3 (TRT)

Yamaçdere is a village in the Ardeşen District, Rize Province, in Black Sea Region of Turkey. Its population is 327 (2021).

== History ==
According to list of villages in Laz language book (2009), name of the village is Bakozi or Bak'va. Most villagers are ethnically Laz.

== Geography ==
The village is located 9 kilometres (5.6 mi) away from Ardeşen.
