= Arıcılar, Ardeşen =

Arıcılar Caboyıt
- Village
- Location in Turkey
- Coordinates: 41°07′39″N 41°10′07″E
- Country: Turkey
- Province: Rize
- District: Ardeşen
- Population (2023): 107
- Time zone: UTC+3 (TRT)

Arıcılar is a village in the Ardeşen District, Rize Province, in Black Sea Region of Turkey. Its population is 107 (2023).

== History ==
According to list of villages in Laz language book (2009), name of the village is Caboyıt. Most villagers are ethnically Laz.

== Geography ==
The village is located 28 kilometres (17 mi) away from Ardeşen.
