= Çınarlı, Fındıklı =

Çınarlı Churchava (Laz language)
- Village
- Location in Turkey
- Coordinates: 41.2383°N 41.1744°E
- Country: Turkey
- Province: Rize
- District: Fındıklı
- Elevation: 508 m (1,667 ft)
- Population (2021): 200
- Time zone: UTC+3 (TRT)

Çınarlı is a village in the Fındıklı District, Rize Province, in Black Sea Region of Turkey. Its population is 200 (2021).

== History ==
According to list of villages in Laz language book (2009), name of the village is Churchava. Most villagers are ethnically Laz.

== Geography ==
The village is located 5 kilometres (3.1 mi) away from Fındıklı.
