= Yeniyol, Ardeşen =

Yeniyol Oce (Laz language)
- Village
- Country: Turkey
- Province: Rize
- District: Ardeşen
- Elevation: 508 m (1,667 ft)
- Population (2021): 409
- Time zone: UTC+3 (TRT)

Yeniyol is a village in the Ardeşen District, Rize Province, in Black Sea Region of Turkey. Its population is 409 (2021).

== History ==
According to list of villages in Laz language book (2009), name of the village is Oce. Most villagers are ethnically Hemshin.

== Geography ==
The village is located 15 kilometres (9.3 mi) away from Ardeşen.
