= Liman, Fındıklı =

Liman Torotsi (Laz language)
- Neighbourhood
- Country: Turkey
- Province: Rize
- District: Fındıklı
- Municipality: Fındıklı
- Population (2021): 430
- Time zone: UTC+3 (TRT)

Liman is a neighbourhood of the town Fındıklı, Fındıklı District, Rize Province, northeastern Turkey. Its population is 430 (2021).

== History ==
According to list of villages in Laz language book (2009), name of the neighbourhood is Torotsi. Most inhabitants of the neighbourhood are ethnically Laz.
