= Beyazkaya =

Beyazkaya Agheni (Laz language)
- Village
- Location in Turkey
- Coordinates: 41°09′21″N 40°58′47″E
- Country: Turkey
- Province: Rize
- District: Ardeşen
- Elevation: 252 m (827 ft)
- Population (2021): 257
- Time zone: UTC+3 (TRT)

Beyazkaya is a village in the Ardeşen District, Rize Province, in Black Sea Region of Turkey, and its population is 257 (2021).

== History ==
According to list of villages in Laz language book (2009), name of the village is Agheni, which means "new village". Most villagers are ethnically Laz.

== Geography ==
The village is located 5 kilometres (3.1 mi) away from Ardeşen.
