= Deremezra, Ardeşen =

Deremezra Oghvare
- Village
- Country: Turkey
- Province: Rize
- District: Ardeşen
- Population (2022): 142
- Time zone: UTC+3 (TRT)

Deremezra is a village in the Ardeşen District, Rize Province, in Black Sea Region of Turkey. Its population is 142 (2022).

== History ==
According to list of villages in Laz language book (2009), name of the village is Oghvare. Most villagers are ethnically Laz.

== Geography ==
The village is located 19 kilometres (12 mi) away from Ardeşen.
