= Aslandere =

Aslandere Çikuleti (Laz language)
- Village
- Location in Turkey
- Coordinates: 41°15′13″N 41°14′46″E
- Country: Turkey
- Province: Rize
- District: Fındıklı
- Elevation: 355 m (1,165 ft)
- Population (2021): 264
- Time zone: UTC+3 (TRT)

Aslandere is a village in the Fındıklı District, Rize Province, in Black Sea Region of Turkey. Its population is 264 (2021).

== History ==
According to list of villages in Laz language book (2009), name of the village is Çikuleti. Most villagers are ethnically Laz or Hemshin.

== Geography ==
The village is located 10 kilometres (6.2 mi) away from Fındıklı. The village has a road which passes from Gürcüdüzü plateau.
