= Kirazlık, Ardeşen =

Kirazlık Celaiskur (Laz language)
- Village
- Country: Turkey
- Province: Rize
- District: Ardeşen
- Elevation: 537 m (1,762 ft)
- Population (2021): 118
- Time zone: UTC+3 (TRT)

Kirazlık is a village in the Ardeşen District, Rize Province, in Black Sea Region of Turkey. Its population is 118 (2021).

== History ==
According to list of villages in Laz language book (2009), name of the village is Celaiskur. Most villagers are ethnically Laz.

== Geography ==
The village is located 17 kilometres (11 mi) away from Ardeşen.
