= Eskiarmutluk =

Eskiarmutluk Chumayida (Laz language)
- Village
- Location in Turkey
- Coordinates: 41°07′56″N 41°09′38″E
- Country: Turkey
- Province: Rize
- District: Ardeşen
- Elevation: 764 m (2,507 ft)
- Population (2021): 60
- Time zone: UTC+3 (TRT)

Eskiarmutluk is a village in the Ardeşen District, Rize Province, in Black Sea Region of Turkey. Its population is 60 (2021).

== History ==
According to list of villages in Laz language book (2009), name of the village is Ch'umayida. Most villagers are ethnically Laz.

== Geography ==
The village is located 30 kilometres (19 mi) away from Ardeşen.
