= Cennet (disambiguation) =

Cennet (Arabic: جَنّة) may refer to:

- Cennet, Turkish for "paradise"
- Cennet'in Gözyaşları, Turkish drama television series
- Cennet and Cehennem, two large sinkholes in the Taurus Mountains, in Mersin Province, Turkey
- Cennet, Fındıklı, village in the Fındıklı, Rize Province, in Black Sea Region of Turkey
- Meryem Cennet Çal (born 2000), German-Turkish women's footballer
