= Gündoğan, Ardeşen =

Gündoğan Mutafi or Muttafi (Laz language)
- Village
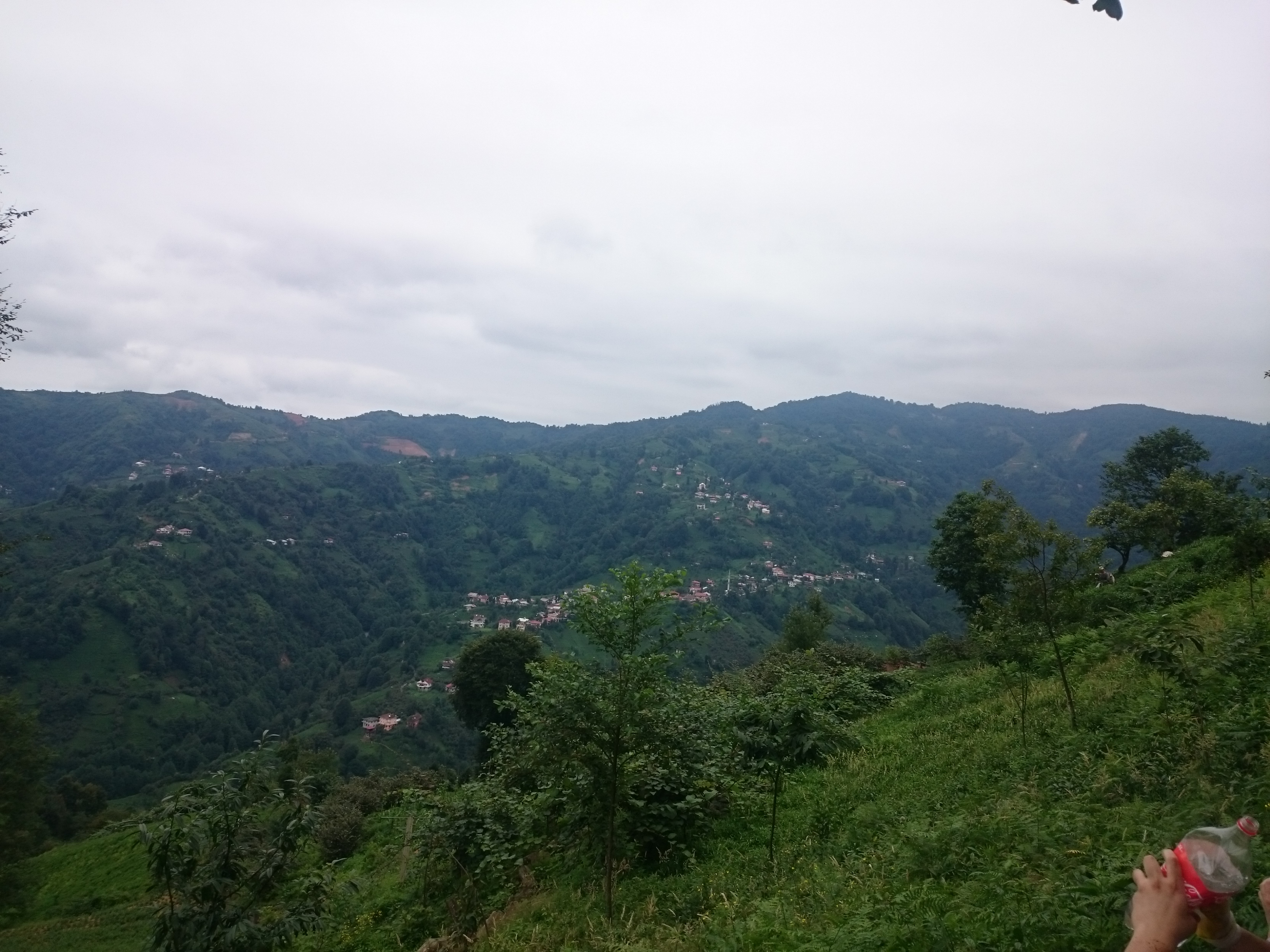

- Location within Turkey
- Coordinates: 41.1738°N 41.085°E
- Country: Turkey
- Province: Rize
- District: Ardeşen
- Elevation: 508 m (1,667 ft)
- Population (2021): 160
- Time zone: UTC+3 (TRT)

Gündoğan is a village in the Ardeşen District, Rize Province, in Black Sea Region of Turkey. Its population is 160 (2021).

== History ==
According to list of villages in Laz language book (2009), name of the village is Mutafi. According to Avarız source from 1681, name of the village is Yovanvati. Most villagers are ethnically Laz.

== Geography ==
The village is located 14 kilometres (8.7 mi) away from Ardeşen.
