= Doğanay, Fındıklı =

Doğanay Hemsheti (Laz language)
- Village
- Country: Turkey
- Province: Rize
- District: Fındıklı
- Elevation: 298 m (978 ft)
- Population (2021): 60
- Time zone: UTC+3 (TRT)

Doğanay is a village in the Fındıklı District, Rize Province, in Black Sea Region of Turkey. Its population is 60 (2021).

== History ==
According to list of villages in Laz language book (2009), name of the village is Hemsheti, which means "Hemshin hometown" in Laz language. Most villagers are ethnically Hemshin.

== Geography ==
The village is located 10 kilometres (6.2 mi) away from Fındıklı.
