= Avcılar, Fındıklı =

Avcılar Andravati (Laz language)
- Village
- Location in Turkey
- Coordinates: 41.23°N 41.1777°E
- Country: Turkey
- Province: Rize
- District: Fındıklı
- Elevation: 320 m (1,050 ft)
- Population (2021): 209
- Time zone: UTC+3 (TRT)

Avcılar is a village in the Fındıklı District, Rize Province, in Black Sea Region of Turkey. Its population is 209 (2021).

== History ==
According to list of villages in Laz language book (2009), the name of the village is Andravati. Most villagers are ethnically Laz.

== Geography ==
The village is located 7 kilometres (4.3 mi) away from Fındıklı.
