= Küçükköy, Ardeşen =

Küçükköy Tsxuleti or Suxuleti (Laz language)
- Village
- Country: Turkey
- Province: Rize
- District: Ardeşen
- Population (2021): 115
- Time zone: UTC+3 (TRT)

Küçükköy is a village in the Ardeşen District, Rize Province, in Black Sea Region of Turkey. Its population is 115 (2021).

== History ==
According to list of villages in Laz language book (2009), name of the village is Tsxuleti, which means "with pear". Most villagers are ethnically Laz.

== Geography ==
The village is located 13 kilometres (8.1 mi) away from Ardeşen.
