= Düzköy, Fındıklı =

Düzköy
- Village
- Location in Turkey
- Coordinates: 41°9′46″N 41°9′46″E
- Country: Turkey
- Province: Rize
- District: Fındıklı
- Population (2021): 42
- Time zone: UTC+3 (TRT)

Düzköy is a village in the Fındıklı District, Rize Province, in Black Sea Region of Turkey. Its population is 42 (2021). In 2017 the village passed from the Ardeşen District to the Fındıklı District.
