= Şehitlik, Ardeşen =

Şehitlik Dobira (Laz language)
- Village
- Country: Turkey
- Province: Rize
- District: Ardeşen
- Elevation: 569 m (1,867 ft)
- Population (2022): 283
- Time zone: UTC+3 (TRT)

Şehitlik is a village in the Ardeşen District, Rize Province, in Black Sea Region of Turkey. Its population is 283 (2022).

== History ==
According to list of villages in Laz language book (2009), name of the village is Dobira, which means "good land". Most villagers are ethnically Laz.

== Geography ==
The village is located 14 kilometres (8.7 mi) away from Ardeşen.

== Population ==
Historical population
Year	Pop.	±% p.a.
1997	192	—
2007	288	+4.14%
2012	274	−0.99%
2017	268	−0.44%
2022	283	+1.10%
Source: 1997 census and TÜIK (2007-2022)
