= Şendere, Ardeşen =

Şendere Sidere
- Village
- Location in Turkey
- Coordinates: 41°08′21″N 41°09′01″E
- Country: Turkey
- Province: Rize
- District: Ardeşen
- Elevation: 793 m (2,602 ft)
- Population (2022): 42
- Time zone: UTC+3 (TRT)

Şendere is a village in the Ardeşen District, Rize Province, in Black Sea Region of Turkey. Its population is 42 (2022).

== History ==
According to list of villages in Laz language book (2009), the name of the village is Sidere. Most villagers are ethnically Laz.

== Geography ==
The village is located 25 kilometres (16 mi) away from Ardeşen.
