= Armağan, Ardeşen =

Armağan Salonç'uri or Salinçoy (Laz language)
- Village
- Location in Turkey
- Coordinates: 41.1680°N 41.0433°E
- Country: Turkey
- Province: Rize
- District: Ardeşen
- Elevation: 508 m (1,667 ft)
- Population (2021): 487
- Time zone: UTC+3 (TRT)

Armağan is a village in the Ardeşen District, Rize Province, in Black Sea Region of Turkey. Its population is 487 (2021).

== History ==
According to list of villages in Laz language book (2009), name of the village is Salonç'uri or Salinçoy, which means "the lower peasant". Most villagers are ethnically Laz.

== Geography ==
The village is located 8 kilometres (5.0 mi) away from Ardeşen.
