= Şenyamaç, Ardeşen =

Şenyamaç Kanteva (Laz language)
- Village
- Location in Turkey
- Coordinates: 41°08′28″N 41°01′22″E
- Country: Turkey
- Province: Rize
- District: Ardeşen
- Elevation: 252 m (827 ft)
- Population (2021): 197
- Time zone: UTC+3 (TRT)

Şenyamaç is a village in the Ardeşen District, Rize Province, in Black Sea Region of Turkey. Its population is 197 (2021).

== History ==
According to list of villages in Laz language book (2009), name of the village is Kanteva. Most villagers are ethnically Laz.

== Geography ==
The village is located 10 kilometres (6.2 mi) away from Ardeşen.
