= Yaylacılar, Fındıklı =

Yaylacılar Xemshilati (Laz language)
- Village
- Country: Turkey
- Province: Rize
- District: Fındıklı
- Elevation: 605 m (1,985 ft)
- Population (2021): 115
- Time zone: UTC+3 (TRT)

Yaylacılar is a village in the Fındıklı District, Rize Province, in Black Sea Region of Turkey. Its population is 115 (2021).

== History ==
According to list of villages in Laz language book (2009), name of the village is Xemshilati, which means "Hemshin village" in Laz language. Most villagers are ethnically Hemshin.

== Geography ==
The village is located 15 kilometres (9.3 mi) away from Fındıklı.
