= Serindere, Ardeşen =

Serindere Kaskuri (Laz language)
- Village
- Location in Turkey
- Coordinates: 41.1772°N 41.0683°E
- Country: Turkey
- Province: Rize
- District: Ardeşen
- Elevation: 514 m (1,686 ft)
- Population (2021): 101
- Time zone: UTC+3 (TRT)

Serindere is a village in the Ardeşen District of Rize Province, in the Black Sea Region of Turkey. Its population is 101 ( as of 2021).

== History ==
According to the list of villages in Laz language book (2009), name of the village is Kyaskuri or Chaskuri, which means "cold stream" in Laz language. Most villagers are ethnically Hemshin.

== Geography ==
The village is located 12 kilometres (7.5 mi) away from Ardeşen.
