= Yenişehitlik =

Yenişehitlik Zenimoshi (Laz language)
- Village
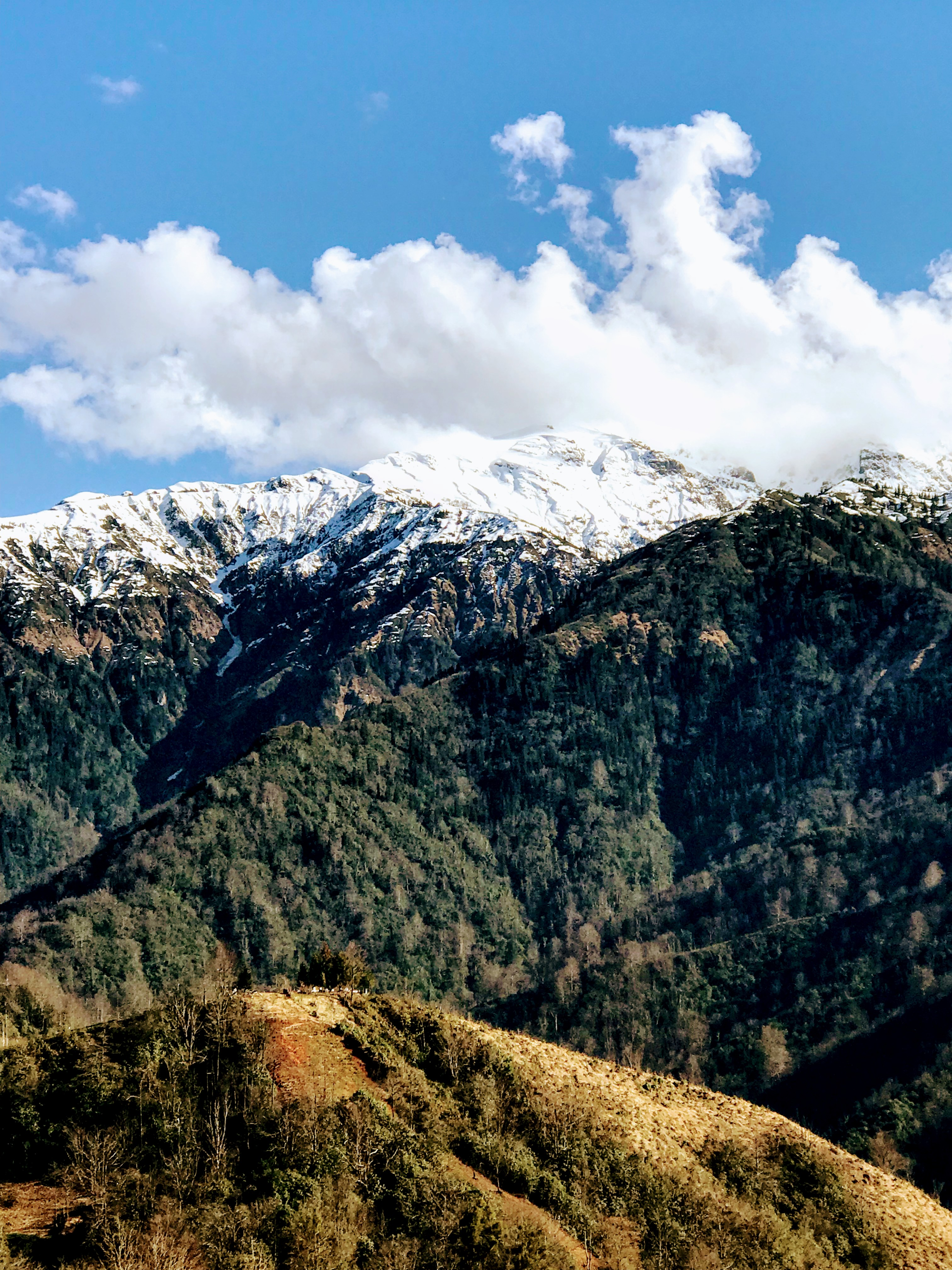
- View from village

- Location within Turkey
- Coordinates: 41°13′40″N 41°14′23″E
- Country: Turkey
- Province: Rize
- District: Fındıklı
- Elevation: 805 m (2,641 ft)
- Population (2021): 86
- Time zone: UTC+3 (TRT)

Yenişehitlik is a village in the Fındıklı District, Rize Province, in Black Sea Region of Turkey. Its population is 86 (2021).

== History ==
According to list of villages in Laz language book (2009), name of the village is Zenimoshi, which means "open field". Most villagers are ethnically Laz.

== Geography ==
The village is located 15 kilometres (9.3 mi) away from Fındıklı.
