= Saatköy =

Saatköy Tsati (Laz language)
- Village
- Country: Turkey
- Province: Rize
- District: Fındıklı
- Elevation: 322 m (1,056 ft)
- Population (2021): 173
- Time zone: UTC+3 (TRT)

Saatköy is a village in the Fındıklı District, Rize Province, in Black Sea Region of Turkey. Its population is 173 (2021).

== History ==
According to list of villages in Laz language book (2009), name of the village is Tsati, which means "sky homeland". Most villagers are ethnically Laz.

== Geography ==
The village is located 10 kilometres (6.2 mi) away from Fındıklı.
