= Hara, Fındıklı =

Hara Xara (Laz language)
- Village
- Country: Turkey
- Province: Rize
- District: Fındıklı
- Elevation: 267 m (876 ft)
- Population (2021): 200
- Time zone: UTC+3 (TRT)

Hara (also: Haraköy) is a village in the Fındıklı District, Rize Province, in Black Sea Region of Turkey. Its population is 200 (2021).

== History ==
According to list of villages in Laz language book (2009), name of the village is Xara, which means "cereal bowl". Most villagers are ethnically Laz.

== Geography ==
The village is located 6 kilometres (3.7 mi) away from Fındıklı.
