= Bahar, Ardeşen =

Bahar Putra (Laz language)
- Neighbourhood
- Country: Turkey
- Province: Rize
- District: Ardeşen
- Municipality: Ardeşen
- Population (2021): 218
- Time zone: UTC+3 (TRT)

Bahar is a neighbourhood of the town Ardeşen, Ardeşen District, Rize Province, northeastern Turkey. Its population is 218 (2021).

== History ==
According to list of villages in Laz language book (2009), name of the neighbourhood is Putra, which is derived from "putri" and means "rotten inside". Most inhabitants of the neighbourhood are ethnically Laz.
