= Yenimahalle, Fındıklı =

Yenimahalle Pachva (Laz language)
- Neighbourhood
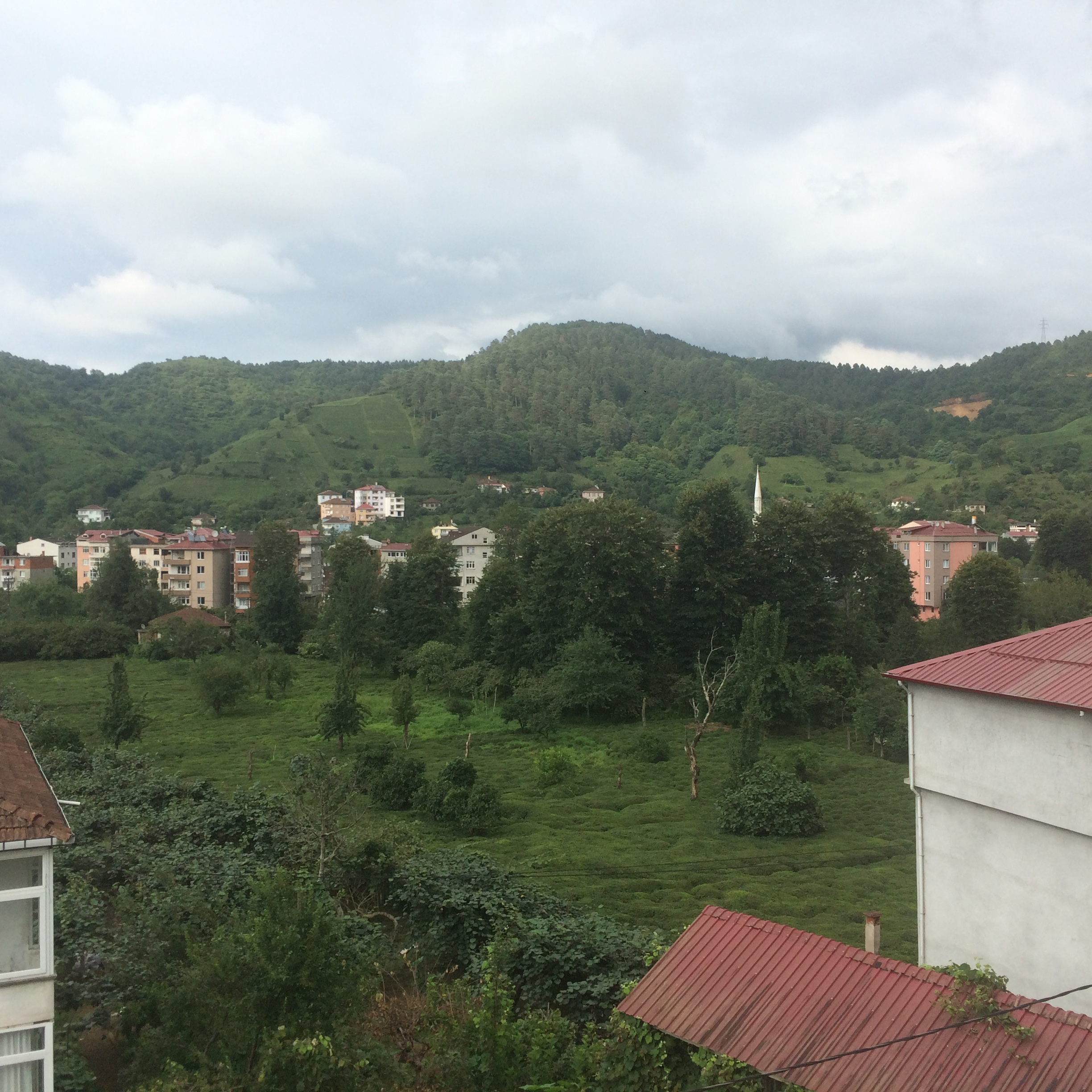

- Location within Turkey
- Coordinates: 41°15′36″N 41°8′49″E
- Country: Turkey
- Province: Rize
- District: Fındıklı
- Municipality: Fındıklı
- Population (2021): 1,189
- Time zone: UTC+3 (TRT)

Yenimahalle (also: Yeni) is a neighbourhood of the town Fındıklı, Fındıklı District, Rize Province, northeastern Turkey. Its population is 1,189 (2021).

== History ==
According to list of villages in Laz language book (2009), name of the neighbourhood is Pachva. Most inhabitants of the neighbourhood are ethnically Laz.
