= Yurtsever, Ardeşen =

Yurtsever Zenimoshi (Laz language)
- Village
- Location in Turkey
- Coordinates: 41°11′48″N 41°05′13″E
- Country: Turkey
- Province: Rize
- District: Ardeşen
- Elevation: 508 m (1,667 ft)
- Population (2021): 147
- Time zone: UTC+3 (TRT)

Yurtsever is a village in the Ardeşen District, Rize Province, in Black Sea Region of Turkey. Its population is 147 (2021).

== History ==
According to list of villages in Laz language book (2009), name of the village is Zenimoshi, which means "open field" in Laz language. Most villagers are ethnically Hemshin.

== Geography ==
The village is located 9 kilometres (5.6 mi) away from Ardeşen.
