= Pirinçlik, Ardeşen =

Pirinçlik Sifat (Laz language)
- Village
- Country: Turkey
- Province: Rize
- District: Ardeşen
- Elevation: 252 m (827 ft)
- Population (2021): 405
- Time zone: UTC+3 (TRT)

Pirinçlik is a village in the Ardeşen District, Rize Province, in Black Sea Region of Turkey. Its population is 405 (2021).

== History ==
As of 1928, the name of the village was Sifat. According to an Ottoman source (1681), the name of the village was Ghatvani. Most villagers are ethnically Laz.

== Geography ==
The village is located 4 kilometres (2.5 mi) away from Ardeşen.
