= Doğanay, Ardeşen =

Doğanay Shangul (Laz language)
- Village
- Country: Turkey
- Province: Rize
- District: Ardeşen
- Elevation: 379 m (1,243 ft)
- Population (2021): 168
- Time zone: UTC+3 (TRT)

Doğanay is a village in the Ardeşen District, Rize Province, in Black Sea Region of Turkey. Its population is 168 (2021).

== History ==
According to list of villages in Laz language book (2009), name of the village is Shangul. Most villagers are ethnically Laz.

== Geography ==
The village is located 17 kilometres (11 mi) away from Ardeşen.
