= Sulak, Fındıklı =

Village in Rize Province, Turkey

Sulak Mzughu (Laz language)
- Village
- Country: Turkey
- Province: Rize
- District: Fındıklı
- Elevation: 508 m (1,667 ft)
- Population (2021): 313
- Time zone: UTC+3 (TRT)

Sulak is a village in the Fındıklı District, Rize Province, in Black Sea Region of Turkey. Its population is 313 (2021).

== History ==
According to list of villages in Laz language book (2009), name of the village is Mzughu, which means "aqueous". Most villagers are ethnically Laz.

== Geography ==
The village is located 8 kilometres (5.0 mi) away from Fındıklı.
