= Işıklı, Ardeşen =

Işıklı Ghere (Laz language)
- Neighbourhood
- Country: Turkey
- Province: Rize
- District: Ardeşen
- Municipality: Ardeşen
- Population (2021): 598
- Time zone: UTC+3 (TRT)

Işıklı is a neighbourhood of the town Ardeşen, Ardeşen District, Rize Province, northeastern Turkey. Its population is 598 as of 2021.

== History ==
According to list of villages in Laz language book (2009), name of the neighbourhood is Ghere. Most inhabitants of the neighbourhood are ethnically Laz. Işıklı, which was a village until 2015, converted into a neighborhood in 2015.

== Geography ==
The village is located 5 kilometres (3.1 mi) away from Ardeşen.
