= Kavaklıdere, Ardeşen =

Kavaklıdere Cibistas
- Neighbourhood
- Country: Turkey
- Province: Rize
- District: Ardeşen
- Municipality: Ardeşen
- Population (2021): 297
- Time zone: UTC+3 (TRT)

Kavaklıdere is a neighbourhood of the town Ardeşen, Ardeşen District, Rize Province, northeastern Turkey. Its population is 297 (2021).

== History ==
According to list of villages in Laz language book (2009), name of the neighbourhood is Cibistas, which is derived from Greek word "kipostási". Most inhabitants of the neighbourhood are ethnically Laz.
