= Yukarıdurak =

Yukarıdurak Jileni Zghemi (Laz language)
- Village
- Location in Turkey
- Coordinates: 41°05′30″N 41°06′17″E
- Country: Turkey
- Province: Rize
- District: Ardeşen
- Elevation: 1,054 m (3,458 ft)
- Population (2021): 124
- Time zone: UTC+3 (TRT)

Yukarıdurak is a village in the Ardeşen District, Rize Province, in Black Sea Region of Turkey. Its population is 124 (2021).

== History ==
According to list of villages in Laz language book (2009), name of the village is Jileni Zghemi. Most villagers are ethnically Laz.

== Geography ==
The village is located 18 kilometres (11 mi) away from Ardeşen.
