= Güney, Ardeşen =

Güney Omcore (Laz language)
- Village
- Country: Turkey
- Province: Rize
- District: Ardeşen
- Elevation: 764 m (2,507 ft)
- Population (2021): 45
- Time zone: UTC+3 (TRT)

Güney is a village in the Ardeşen District, Rize Province, in Black Sea Region of Turkey. Its population is 45 (2021).

== History ==
According to list of villages in Laz language book (2009), name of the village is Omcore, which means "sunny". Most villagers are ethnically Laz.

== Geography ==
The village is located 22 kilometres (14 mi) away from Ardeşen.
