= Sahil, Fındıklı =

Sahil Mekiskir (Laz language)
- Neighbourhood
- Location in Turkey
- Coordinates: 41°16′3″N 41°8′18″E
- Country: Turkey
- Province: Rize
- District: Fındıklı
- Municipality: Fındıklı
- Population (2021): 1,965
- Time zone: UTC+3 (TRT)

Sahil is a neighbourhood of the town Fındıklı, Fındıklı District, Rize Province, northeastern Turkey. Its population is 1,965 (2021).

== History ==
According to list of villages in Laz language book (2009), name of the neighbourhood is Mek'iskiri. Most inhabitants of the neighbourhood are ethnically Laz.
