= Sümer, Fındıklı =

Sümer Sumle (Laz language)
- Village
- Country: Turkey
- Province: Rize
- District: Fındıklı
- Elevation: 252 m (827 ft)
- Population (2021): 799
- Time zone: UTC+3 (TRT)

Sümer is a village in the Fındıklı District, Rize Province, in Black Sea Region of Turkey. Its population is 799 (2021).

== History ==
According to list of villages in Laz language book (2009), name of the village is Sumle. Most villagers are ethnically Laz.

== Geography ==
The village is located 9 kilometres (5.6 mi) away from Fındıklı.
