= Yeniköy, Fındıklı =

Yeniköy Gurupiti (Laz language)
- Village
- Country: Turkey
- Province: Rize
- District: Fındıklı
- Elevation: 317 m (1,040 ft)
- Population (2021): 270
- Time zone: UTC+3 (TRT)

Yeniköy is a village in the Fındıklı District, Rize Province, in Black Sea Region of Turkey. Its population is 270 (2021).

== History ==
According to list of villages in Laz language book (2009), name of the village is Gurupiti. Most villagers are ethnically Laz or Hemshin.

== Geography ==
The village is located 7 kilometres (4.3 mi) away from Fındıklı.
