= Seslikaya, Ardeşen =

Seslikaya Amgvani (Laz language)
- Village
- Country: Turkey
- Province: Rize
- District: Ardeşen
- Elevation: 252 m (827 ft)
- Population (2022): 396
- Time zone: UTC+3 (TRT)

Seslikaya is a village in the Ardeşen District, Rize Province, in Black Sea Region of Turkey. Its population is 396 (2022).

== History ==
According to list of villages in Laz language book (2009), name of the village is Amgvani. Most villagers are ethnically Laz.

== Geography ==
The village is located 8 kilometres (5.0 mi) away from Ardeşen.

== Population ==
Historical population
Year	Pop.	±% p.a.
1842	157*	—
1876	193*	—
1985	1,961	—
1990	1,599	−4.00%
1997	399	−17.99%
2007	455	+1.32%
2012	450	−0.22%
2017	364	−4.15%
2022	396	+1.70%
*male population Source: Hiçyılmaz (1842-1876), population censuses (1985-1997) and TÜIK (2007-2022)
