= Yavuz, Ardeşen =

Yavuz Cuneli Angvan (Laz language)
- Village
- Country: Turkey
- Province: Rize
- District: Ardeşen
- Elevation: 328 m (1,076 ft)
- Population (2021): 256
- Time zone: UTC+3 (TRT)

Yavuz is a village in the Ardeşen District, Rize Province, in Black Sea Region of Turkey. Its population is 256 (2021).

== History ==
According to list of villages in Laz language book (2009), name of the village is Cuneliangvan, which means "sunny angvan". Most villagers are ethnically Laz.

== Geography ==
The village is located 12 kilometres (7.5 mi) away from Ardeşen.
