= Barış, Ardeşen =

Barış Metisti (Laz language)
- Neighbourhood
- Country: Turkey
- Province: Rize
- District: Ardeşen
- Municipality: Ardeşen
- Population (2021): 555
- Time zone: UTC+3 (TRT)

Barış is a neighbourhood of the town of Ardeşen in Ardeşen District, Rize Province, northeastern Turkey. Its population is 555 (2021).

== History ==
According to list of villages in Laz language book (2009), name of the neighbourhood is Metisti. Most inhabitants of the neighbourhood are ethnically Laz.
