= Mercedes-Benz Tourrider =

Tourrider
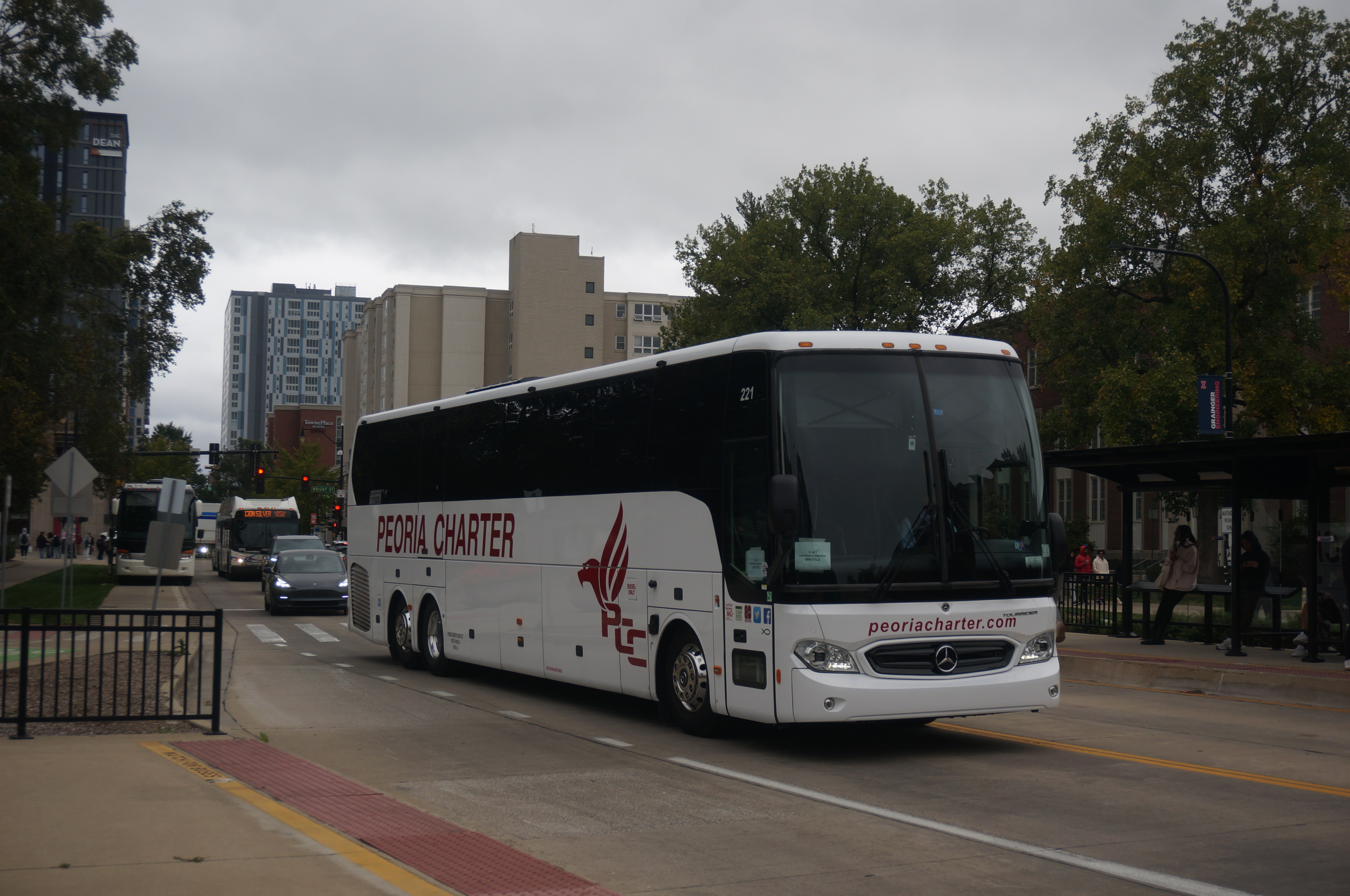

Overview
- Manufacturer: Daimler Buses
- Production: 2023–present
- Assembly: Hoşdere, Turkey

Body and chassis
- Class: Motorcoach
- Body style: Single-decker rigid bus
- Doors: 1
- Floor type: High-floor

Powertrain
- Engine: Diesel: Mercedes-Benz OM 471 (Detroit Diesel DD13)
- Transmission: Allison B500R

Dimensions
- Wheelbase: 24 ft (7.32 m)
- Length: 45 ft 8 in (13.92 m)
- Width: 102 in (259.08 cm)
- Height: 12 ft 1 in (3.68 m)

Chronology
- Predecessor: Setra

The Mercedes-Benz Tourrider is a single-deck, stainless steel motorcoach manufactured by Daimler Buses for the North American market. It replaces Setra's lineup as Daimler's primary motorcoach offering in the region.

== Details ==
The Tourrider is offered in two variants: the base Tourrider Business, and upmarket Tourrider Premium. It is only offered as a 45-foot coach. It is assembled in Hoşdere, Turkey.
