= Bayırcık =

Bayırcık Yanivat (Laz language)
- Village
- Location in Turkey
- Coordinates: 41°07′47″N 41°05′15″E
- Country: Turkey
- Province: Rize
- District: Ardeşen
- Elevation: 508 m (1,667 ft)
- Population (2021): 122
- Time zone: UTC+3 (TRT)

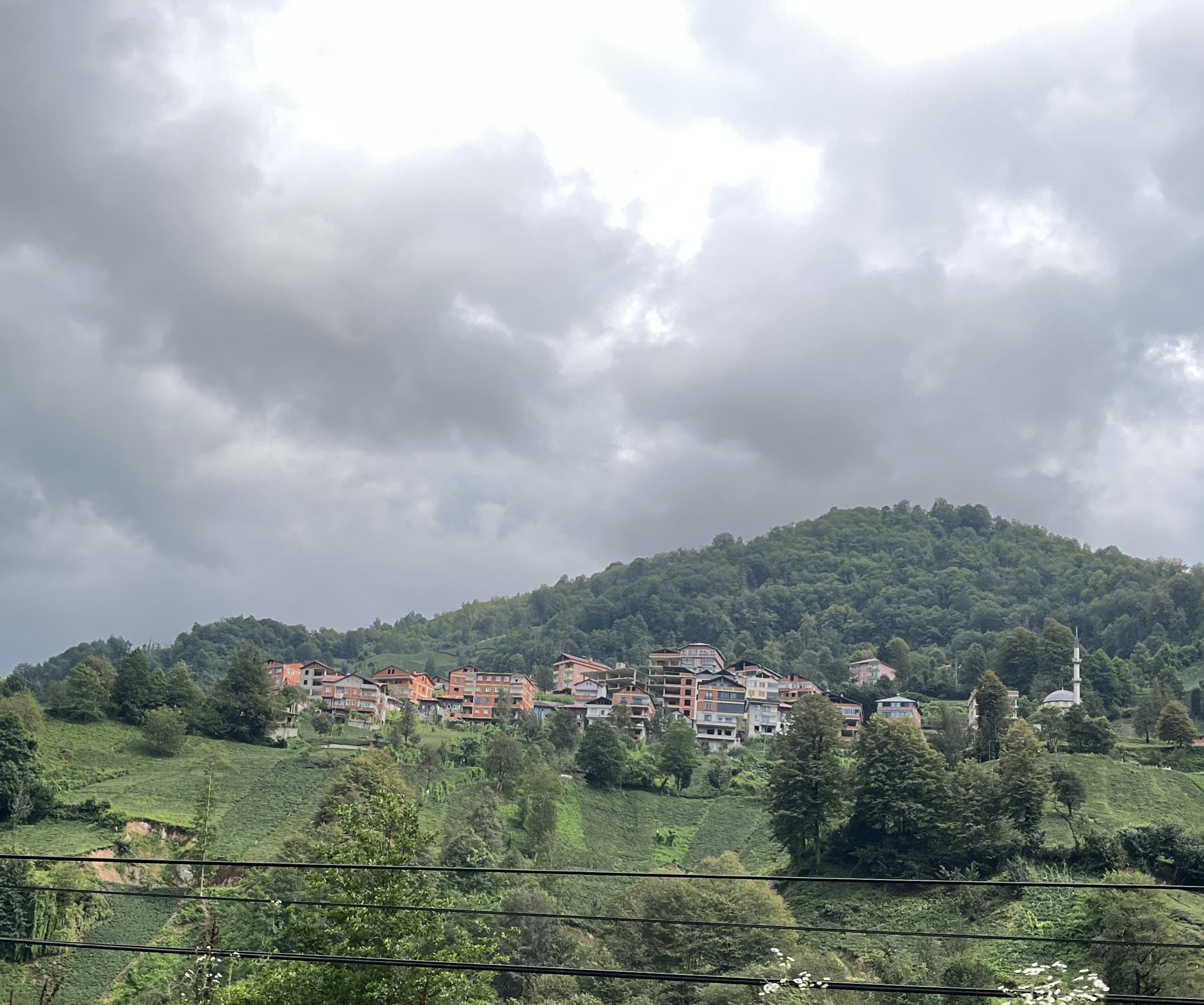
Bayırcık, Ardeşen

Bayırcık is a village in the Ardeşen District, Rize Province, in Black Sea Region of Turkey. Its population is 122 (2021).

== History ==
According to list of villages in Laz language book (2009), name of the village is Yanivat. Most villagers are ethnically Laz.

== Geography ==
The village is located 18 kilometres (11 mi) away from Ardeşen.
