= Kıyıcık, Fındıklı =

Kıyıcık Mosxora (Laz language)
- Village
- Country: Turkey
- Province: Rize
- District: Fındıklı
- Elevation: 508 m (1,667 ft)
- Population (2021): 208
- Time zone: UTC+3 (TRT)

Kıyıcık is a village in the Fındıklı District, Rize Province, in Black Sea Region of Turkey. Its population is 208 (2021).

== History ==
According to list of villages in Laz language book (2009), name of the village is Mosxora or Motsxore (მოცხორე or მაცხორა). Most villagers are ethnically Laz. There is a neighborhood named Güzelyalı (Kontiva) in the village.

== Geography ==
The village is located 10 kilometres (6.2 mi) away from Fındıklı.
