= Yeşiltepe, Ardeşen =

Yeşiltepe Shangul
- Village
- Country: Turkey
- Province: Rize
- District: Ardeşen
- Population (2022): 146
- Time zone: UTC+3 (TRT)

Yeşiltepe is a village in the Ardeşen District, Rize Province, in Black Sea Region of Turkey. Its population is 146 (2022).

== History ==
According to list of villages in Laz language book (2009), the name of the village is Shangul. Most villagers are ethnically Laz.

== Geography ==
The village is located 12 kilometres (7.5 mi) away from Ardeşen.
