= Aşağıdurak =

Aşağıdurak Tsaleni Zghemi (Laz language)
- Village
- Location in Turkey
- Coordinates: 41°07′02″N 41°05′20″E
- Country: Turkey
- Province: Rize
- District: Ardeşen
- Elevation: 764 m (2,507 ft)
- Population (2021): 248
- Time zone: UTC+3 (TRT)

Aşağıdurak is a village in the Ardeşen District, Rize Province, in Black Sea Region of Turkey. Its population is 248 (2021).

== History ==
According to list of villages in Laz language book (2009), name of the village is Tsaleni Zghemi. Most villagers are ethnically Laz.

== Geography ==
The village is located 18 kilometres (11 mi) away from Ardeşen.
