= Şentepe, Ardeşen =

Şentepe Chichivati (Laz language)
- Neighbourhood
- Country: Turkey
- Province: Rize
- District: Ardeşen
- Municipality: Ardeşen
- Population (2021): 329
- Time zone: UTC+3 (TRT)

Şentepe is a neighbourhood of the town Ardeşen, Ardeşen District, Rize Province, northeastern Turkey. Its population is 329 (2021).

== History ==
According to list of villages in Laz language book (2009), name of the neighbourhood is Chichivati. Most inhabitants of the neighbourhood are ethnically Laz.
