= Ortaalan, Ardeşen =

Ortaalan
- Village
- Country: Turkey
- Province: Rize
- District: Ardeşen
- Elevation: 361 m (1,184 ft)
- Population (2021): 290
- Time zone: UTC+3 (TRT)

Ortaalan is a village in the Ardeşen District, Rize Province, in Black Sea Region of Turkey. Its population is 290 (2021).

== History ==
Most villagers are ethnically Laz. The village has two neighborhoods, which are called Paniki and Papati.

== Geography ==
The village is located 12 kilometres (7.5 mi) away from Ardeşen.
