= Şenyurt, Ardeşen =

Şenyurt
- Village
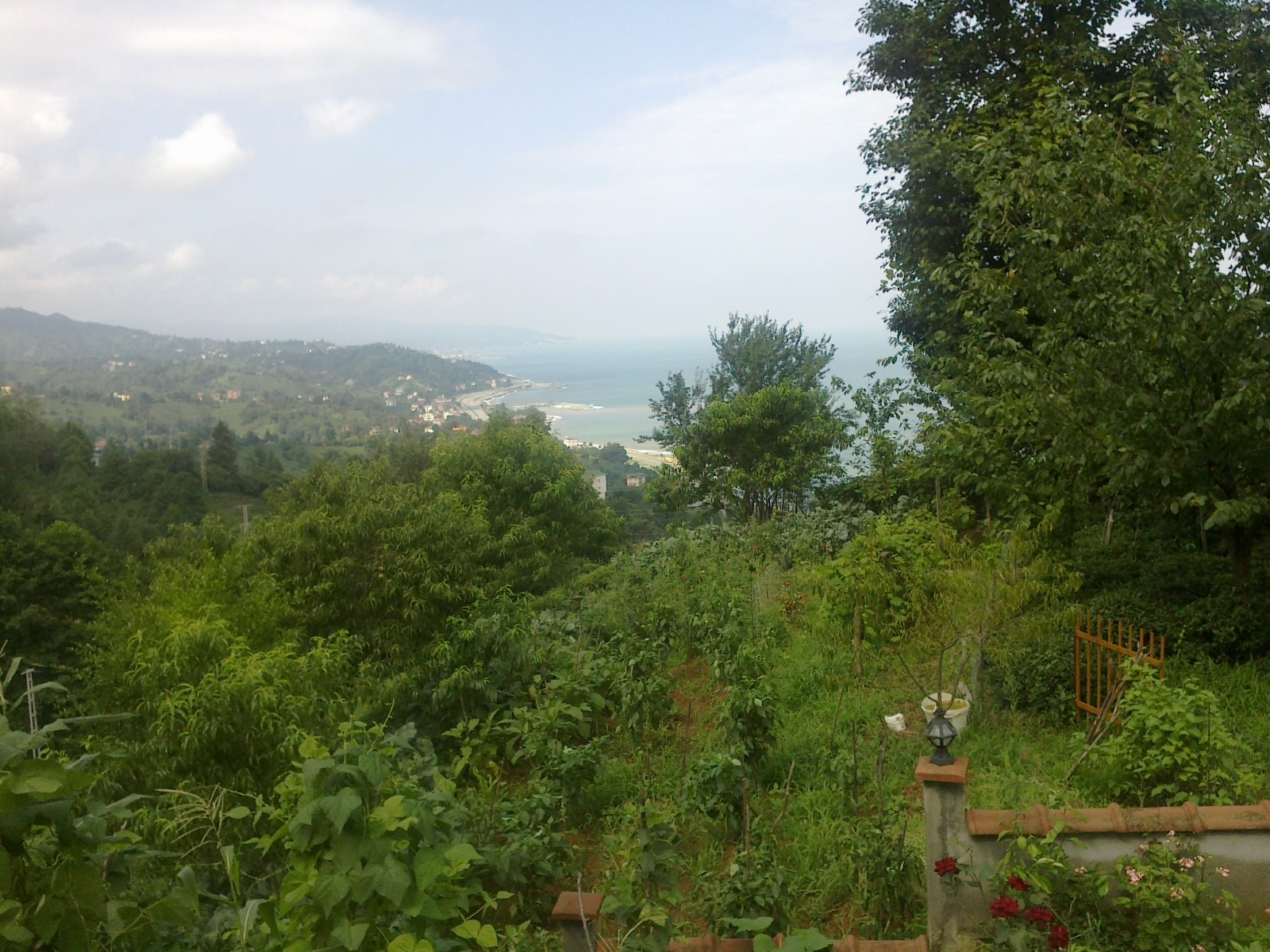

- Location within Turkey
- Coordinates: 41°12′55″N 41°4′21″E
- Country: Turkey
- Province: Rize
- District: Ardeşen
- Elevation: 252 m (827 ft)
- Population (2022): 272
- Time zone: UTC+3 (TRT)

Şenyurt is a village in the Ardeşen District, Rize Province, in Black Sea Region of Turkey. Its population is 272 (2022). The village lies 8 km (5 mi) to the east of Ardeşen.

== History ==
According to list of villages in Laz language book (2009), name of the village is Mexeniti. Most villagers are ethnically Laz.

== Population ==
Historical population
| Year | Pop. | ±% p.a. |
|---|---|---|
| 1985 | 395 | — |
| 1990 | 402 | +0.35% |
| 1997 | 296 | −4.28% |
| 2007 | 269 | −0.95% |
| 2012 | 213 | −4.56% |
| 2017 | 220 | +0.65% |
| 2022 | 272 | +4.33% |
Source: 1985 census, 1990 census, 1997 census and TÜIK (2007-2022)
