= Cennet, Fındıklı =

Cennet Chaneti (Laz language)
- Village
- Location in Turkey
- Coordinates: 41°13′51″N 41°11′35″E
- Country: Turkey
- Province: Rize
- District: Fındıklı
- Elevation: 508 m (1,667 ft)
- Population (2021): 102
- Time zone: UTC+3 (TRT)

Cennet is a village in the Fındıklı District, Rize Province, in Black Sea Region of Turkey. Its population is 102 (2021).

== History ==
According to list of villages in Laz language book (2009), name of the village is Chaneti, which means "Laz homeland". Most villagers are ethnically Laz.

== Geography ==
The village is located 8 kilometres (5.0 mi) away from Fındıklı.
