= Meyvalı, Fındıklı =

Meyvalı Canapet (Laz language)
- Village
- Location in Turkey
- Coordinates: 41.20639°N 41.15528°E
- Country: Turkey
- Province: Rize
- District: Fındıklı
- Elevation: 295 m (968 ft)
- Population (2021): 311
- Time zone: UTC+3 (TRT)

Meyvalı is a village in the Fındıklı District, Rize Province, in Black Sea Region of Turkey. Its population is 311 (2021).

== History ==
According to list of villages in Laz language book (2009), name of the village is Canapet, which is derived from the word "chanapeti" and means "Laz homeland". Most villagers are ethnically Laz.

== Geography ==
The village lies to the 9 kilometres (5.6 mi) away from Fındıklı.
