= Tunca, Ardeşen =

Tunca Dutxa (Laz language)
- Municipality
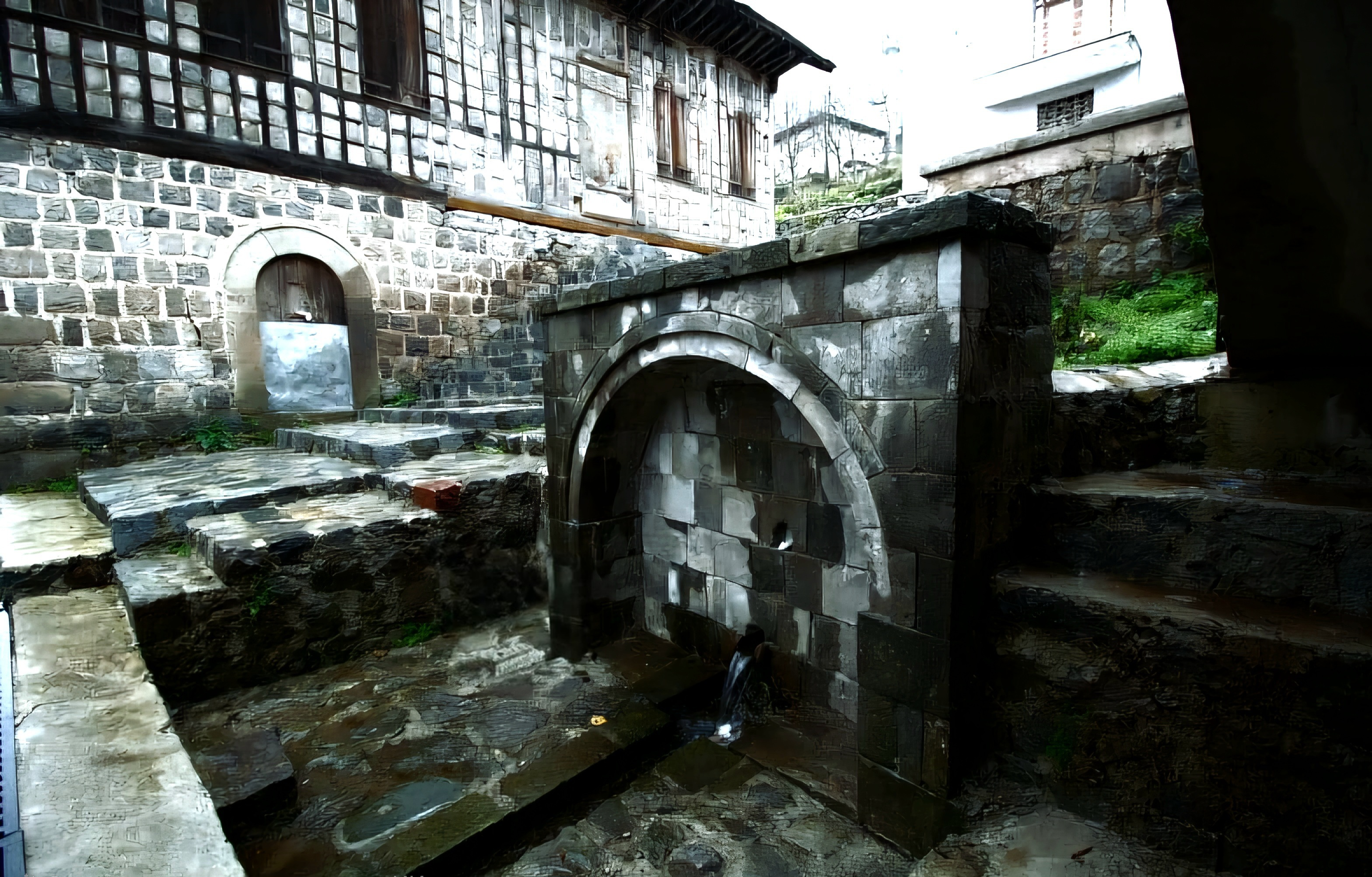

- Location within Turkey
- Coordinates: 41°07′32″N 41°07′21″E
- Country: Turkey
- Province: Rize
- District: Ardeşen
- Population (2021): 4,237
- Time zone: UTC+3 (TRT)

Tunca (Laz language: Dutxe) is a town (belde) in the Ardeşen District, Rize Province, Turkey. Its population is 4,237 (2021). Dutxe is famous for Formulaz festival.

== History ==
According to list of villages in Laz language book (2009), the name of the town is Dutxa or Dutxe, which is derived from dudi-xa, which means "upper place". Most villagers are ethnically Laz.
