= Hoşdere, Ardeşen =

Hoşdere Cherana (Laz language)
- Village
- Country: Turkey
- Province: Rize
- District: Ardeşen
- Elevation: 508 m (1,667 ft)
- Population (2021): 215
- Time zone: UTC+3 (TRT)

Hoşdere is a village in the Ardeşen District, Rize Province, in Black Sea Region of Turkey. Its population is 215 (2021).

== History ==
According to list of villages in Laz language book (2009), name of the village is Cherana, which means "factory". Most villagers are ethnically Laz.

== Geography ==
The village is located 13 kilometres (8.1 mi) away from Ardeşen.
