= Formulaz =

Formulaz (Turkish: Formulaz; Laz: ჶორმულაზი Formulazi) is an annual Laz festival and traditional wooden car race held each year on 21 August, in the northern Turkish province of Rize's Ardeşen district. The name comes from the contraction of the word "Formula" with "Laz", which is the name used for the local people living on the edge of the Black Sea in Northern Turkey. Wooden cars is popular in that region since early 1900's.

== See also ==
- Kolkhoba
