= Akdere, Ardeşen =

Akdere Xocibadi (Laz language)
- Village
- Location in Turkey
- Coordinates: 41.1433°N 41.0430°E
- Country: Turkey
- Province: Rize
- District: Ardeşen
- Elevation: 508 m (1,667 ft)
- Population (2021): 154
- Time zone: UTC+3 (TRT)

Akdere is a village in the Ardeşen District, Rize Province, in Black Sea Region of Turkey. Its population is 154 (2021).

Old name of the village was Hocibadi. Hocibadi (ხოჯიბადი) means "old ox" in Laz language. "Hoci" (ხოჯი) means ox and "badi" (ბადი) means old.
