= Ogün Altıparmak =

Turkish footballer (1938–2025)

Personal information
- Date of birth: 10 November 1938
- Place of birth: Adapazarı, Turkey
- Date of death: 2 February 2025 (aged 86)
- Height: 1.70 m (5 ft 7 in)
- Position: Striker

Youth career
- ?–1955: Karşıyaka

Senior career*
| Years | Team | Apps | (Gls) |
| 1955–1963 | Karşıyaka | 146 | (39) |
| 1963–1968 | Fenerbahçe | 120 | (44) |
| 1968 | Washington Whips | 19 | (6) |
| 1969–1971 | Fenerbahçe | 53 | (23) |

International career
| 1957 | Turkey U18 | 2 | (0) |
| 1962–1964 | Turkey U21 | 2 | (1) |
| 1961–1962 | Turkey A2 | 2 | (1) |
| 1961–1968 | Turkey | 32 | (6) |
- * Club domestic league appearances and goals

Ogün Altıparmak (10 November 1938 – 2 February 2025) was a Turkish professional footballer who played as a striker for Fenerbahçe. He made 32 appearances for the Turkey national team, scoring six goals.

== Career ==
Altıparmak started his career in 1955 at Karşıyaka and then transferred to Fenerbahçe in 1963 with a broken leg. He helped Fenerbahçe win four Turkish League titles and one Turkish Cup title with Fenerbahçe and was the league's top scorer with 16 goals in 1970–71, the year he retired. He made 32 appearances on the Turkey national team.

He also played for the Washington Whips in the 1968 North American Soccer League before returning to Fenerbahçe. In a 2–1 victory over Manchester City he scored the winning goal, having also assisted the equaliser after the Turks fell behind 1–0 in the first half. It ousted the English team from the European Champions Cup in October 1968.

== Death ==
Altıparmak died on 2 February 2025, at the age of 86. His son Batur Altıparmak also played for Fenerbahçe in addition to Gaziantepspor, Ankaragücü and Şekerspor between 1990 and 2001. He is currently a FIFA agent.

== Career statistics ==
Appearances and goals by national team and year
| National team | Year | Apps | Goals |
|---|---|---|---|
| Turkey | 1961 | 3 | 0 |
| Turkey | 1962 | 4 | 0 |
| Turkey | 1963 | 1 | 0 |
| Turkey | 1964 | 2 | 0 |
| Turkey | 1965 | 6 | 2 |
| Turkey | 1966 | 4 | 1 |
| Turkey | 1967 | 8 | 2 |
| Turkey | 1968 | 4 | 1 |
| Total | | 32 | 6 |

Scores and results list Turkey's goal tally first, score column indicates score after each Altıparmak goal.

List of international goals scored by Ogün Altıparmak
| No. | Date | Venue | Opponent | Score | Result | Competition |
|---|---|---|---|---|---|---|
| 1 | 21 July 1965 | Amjadieh Stadium, Tehran, Iran | Pakistan | 1–0 | 3–1 | 1965 RCD Cup |
| 2 | 21 July 1965 | Amjadieh Stadium, Tehran, Iran | Pakistan | 3–0 | 3–1 | 1965 RCD Cup |
| 3 | 16 November 1966 | Dalymount Park, Dublin, Ireland | Republic of Ireland | 2–1 | 1–2 | UEFA Euro 1968 qualifying |
| 4 | 22 February 1967 | Ankara 19 Mayıs Stadium, Ankara, Turkey | Republic of Ireland | 2–0 | 2–1 | UEFA Euro 1968 qualifying |
| 5 | 28 November 1967 | National Stadium, Dhaka, East Pakistan | Pakistan | 5–0 | 7–4 | 1967 RCD Cup |
| 6 | 16 October 1968 | Windsor Park, Belfast, Northern Ireland | Northern Ireland | 1–0 | 1–4 | 1970 FIFA World Cup qualification |

== Honours ==
Karşıyaka

- Izmir Futbol Ligi: 1958–59

Fenerbahçe

- Balkans Cup: 1966–67
- Süper Lig: 1963–64, 1964–65, 1967–68, 1969–70
- Turkish Cup: 1967
- Turkish Super Cup: 1968
- Atatürk Cup: 1964
- Spor Toto Cup: 1967
- TSYD Cup: 1969

Individual

- Süper Lig top scorer: 1970–71 (16 goals)
