= Kerem Altiparmak =

Legal professor and Freedom of Association advocate

- Occupations: Professor, human rights activist

Kerem Altiparmak is a Turkish legal professor, human rights activist, and one of the founders of the Freedom of Expression Association. He is also a member of the Ankara Bar association and is also a consultant for the International Commission of Jurists.

Altiparmak previously served as director of the Human Rights Centre of Ankara University. He is a frequent contributor to human rights NGOs and has received both the Columbia Global Freedom of Expression Award in 2016 and the Franco-German Prize for Human Rights & the Rule of Law in 2017.
