= Batur Altıparmak =

Turkish footballer (born 1971)

Personal information
- Date of birth: January 1, 1971 (age 55)
- Place of birth: Istanbul, Turkey
- Position: Defender

Youth career
- 1987–1989: Fenerbahçe

Senior career*
Years	Team	Apps	(Gls)
1989–1990	Fenerbahçe	0	(0)
1990	→Zeytinburnuspor (loan)	7	(1)
1991–1992	Gaziantepspor	3	(0)
1991–1992	→Çengelköy SK (loan)	20	(4)
1992–1993	Çengelköy SK	29	(8)
1993–1994	Fenerbahçe	0	(0)
1994–1998	MKE Ankaragücü	53	(2)
1998–2001	Turanspor	30	(2)

International career^{‡}
1986–1987	Turkey U16	9	(0)
1988	Turkey U18	1	(0)
- * Club domestic league appearances and goals as of 13 January 2018 ‡ National team caps and goals as of 13 January 2018

Batur Altıparmak (born 1 January 1971) is a Turkish former footballer who played as a defender. After his playing career, Batur became a footballing agent, and managed famous Turkish players like Caner Erkin, Mehmet Topal, Selçuk İnan, and Enes Ünal, amongst others.

== International career ==
A youth international for Turkey, Batur represented Turkey at the 1987 UEFA European Under-16 Championship.

== Personal life ==
Batur is the son of the Turkish international footballer Ogün Altıparmak.
