= Arılı River =

Water stream in Rize province, Turkey

Coordinates: 41°16′09″N 41°08′13″E

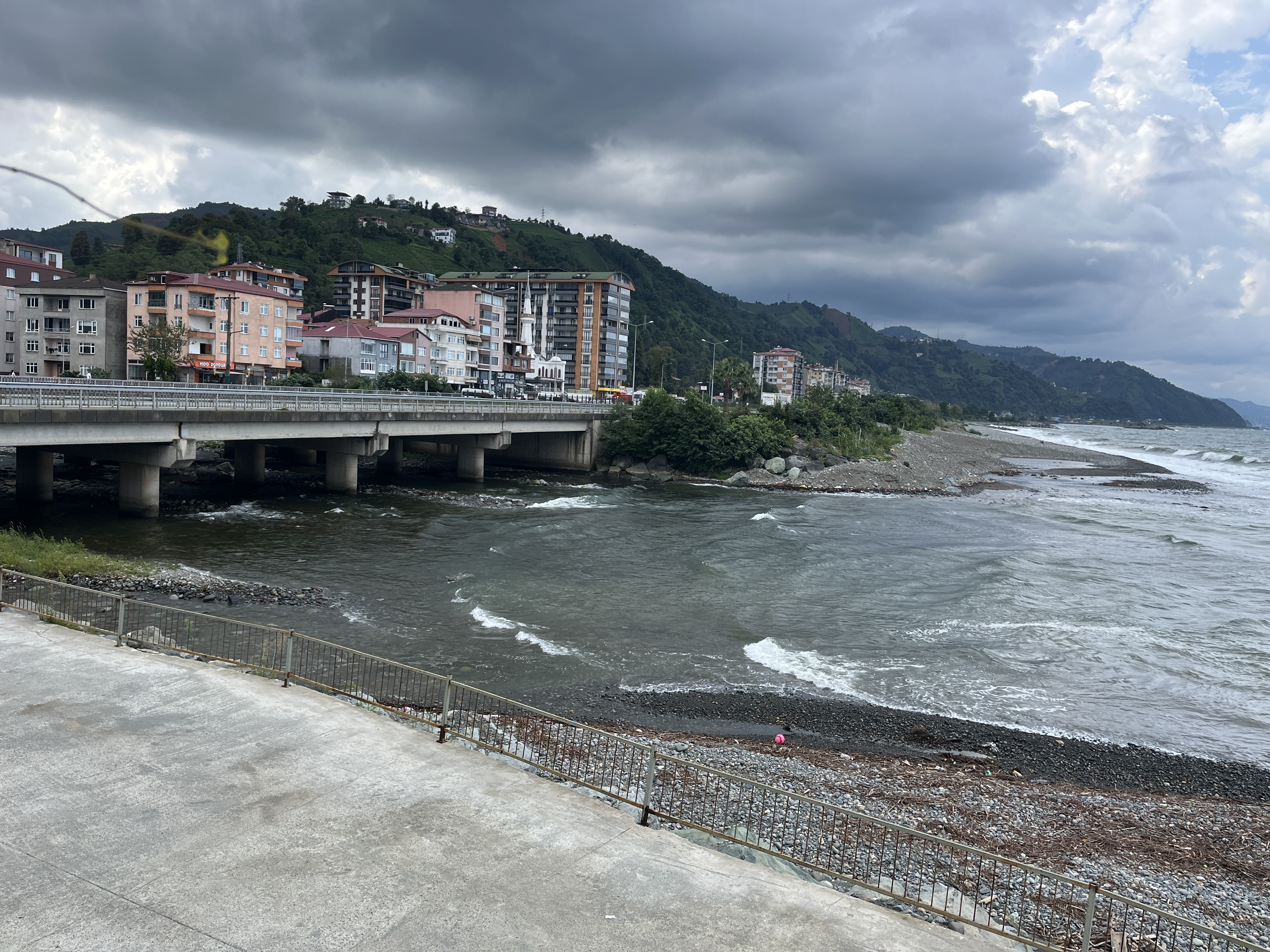
Arılı Stream, Fındıklı

Arılı River (Laz language: Pitsxala River) is one of the main water streams of Fındıklı in the eastern Black Sea Region of Turkey.

== Description ==
Arılı River rises in Kaçkar Mountains in Fındıklı. The Arılı River is 31.5 kilometres (19.6 mi) long.
