= Fındıklı District =

District of Rize Province, Turkey

- District
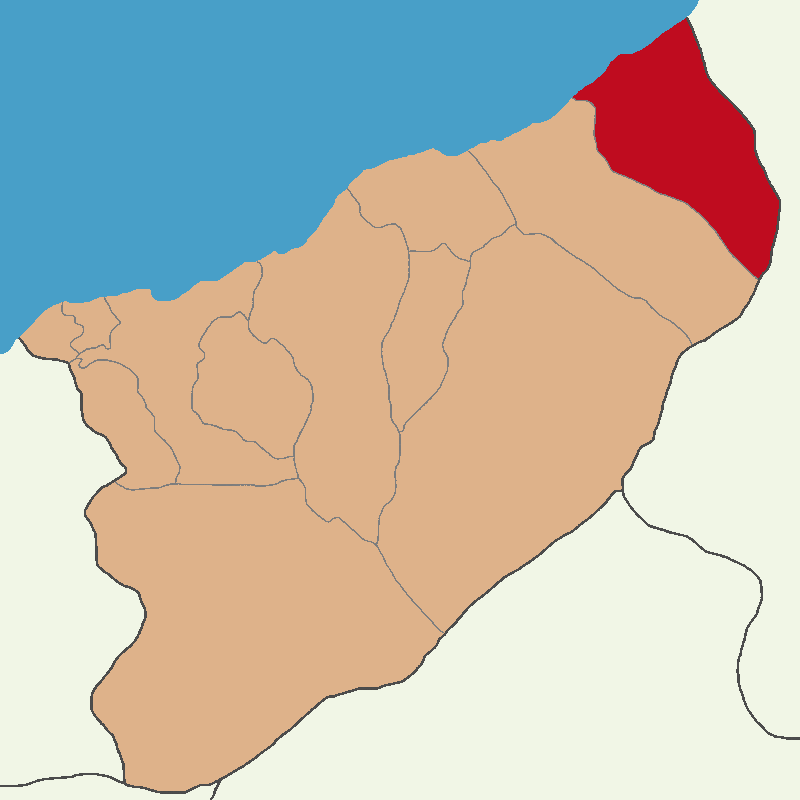
- Map showing Fındıklı District in Rize Province

- Location in Turkey
- Coordinates: 41°08′N 41°01′E
- Country: Turkey
- Province: Rize
- Seat: Fındıklı

Government
  - Kaymakam: Eyup Gürdal
- Area: 383 km^{2} (148 sq mi)
- Population (2021): 16,487
  - Density: 43/km^{2} (110/sq mi)
- Time zone: UTC+3 (TRT)
- Website: www.findikli.gov.tr

Fındıklı District is a district of the Rize Province of Turkey. Its seat is the town of Fındıklı. Its area is 383 km^{2}, and its population is 16,487 (2021).

== Composition ==
There is one municipality in Fındıklı District:

- Fındıklı

There are 23 villages in Fındıklı District:

- Arılı
- Aslandere
- Avcılar
- Beydere
- Cennet
- Çağlayan
- Çınarlı
- Derbent
- Doğanay
- Düzköy
- Gürsu
- Hara
- Ihlamurlu
- Karaali
- Kıyıcık
- Meyvalı
- Saatköy
- Sulak
- Sümer
- Tepecik
- Yaylacılar
- Yeniköy
- Yenişehitlik
