= Ardeşen District =

District of Rize Province, Turkey

- District
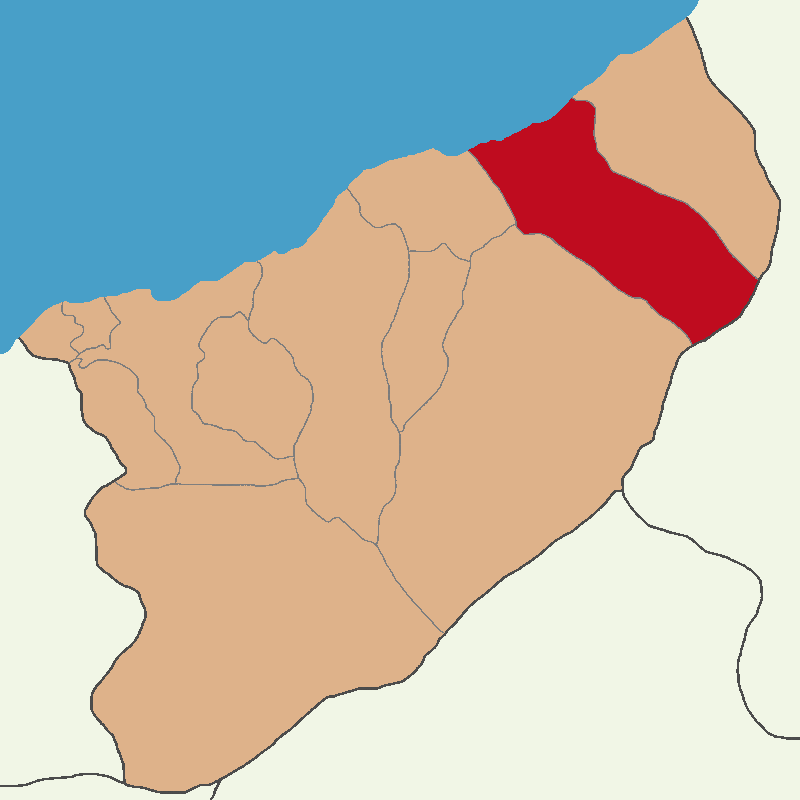
- Map showing Ardeşen District in Rize Province

- Location in Turkey
- Coordinates: 41°11′N 40°59′E
- Country: Turkey
- Province: Rize
- Seat: Ardeşen

Government
  - Kaymakam: Ekrem Çeçen
- Area: 376 km^{2} (145 sq mi)
- Population (2021): 42,542
  - Density: 110/km^{2} (290/sq mi)
- Time zone: UTC+3 (TRT)
- Website: www.ardesen.gov.tr

Ardeşen District is a district of the Rize Province of Turkey. Its seat is the town of Ardeşen. Its area is 376 km^{2}, and its population is 42,542 (2021).

== Composition ==
There are two municipalities in Ardeşen District:

- Ardeşen
- Tunca

There are 41 villages in Ardeşen District:

- Akdere
- Akkaya
- Arıcılar
- Armağan
- Aşağıdurak
- Bayırcık
- Beyazkaya
- Çıraklar
- Deremezra
- Doğanay
- Duygulu
- Eskiarmutluk
- Gündoğan
- Güney
- Hoşdere
- Kaçkar
- Kirazlık
- Köprüköy
- Küçükköy
- Kurtuluş
- Manganez
- Önder
- Ortaalan
- Özgür
- Pınarlı
- Pirinçlik
- Serindere
- Seslikaya
- Sinanköy
- Şehitlik
- Şendere
- Şenyamaç
- Şenyurt
- Yamaçdere
- Yavuz
- Yeniköy
- Yeniyol
- Yeşiltepe
- Yukarıdurak
- Yurtsever
- Zeytinlik
