= Fındıklı, Rize =

Fındıklı Viǯe/Vitz’e/Viçe
- Municipality
- Location within Turkey
- Coordinates: 41°08′N 41°01′E
- Country: Turkey
- Province: Rize
- District: Fındıklı

Government
  - Mayor: Ercüment Şahin Çervatoğlu (CHP)
- Population (2021): 10,886
- Time zone: UTC+3 (TRT)
- Postal code: 53700
- Area code: 0464
- Climate: Cfa
- Website: www.findikli.bel.tr

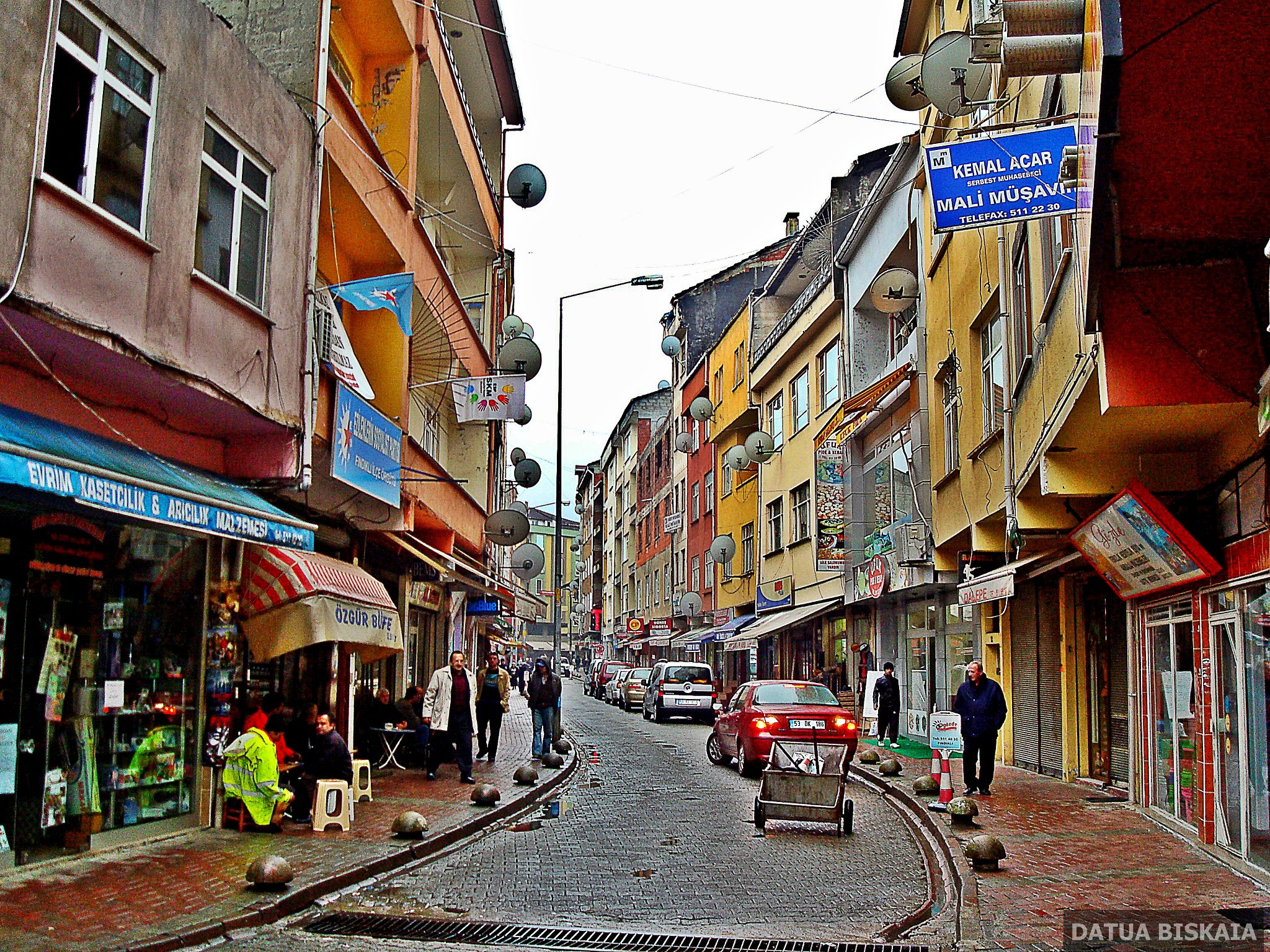
Fındıklı

Fındıklı is a town in Rize Province on the Black Sea coast of Turkey, east of the city of Rize. It is the seat of Fındıklı District.

== Etymology ==
The town was formerly named and still locally known as Viçe (Ottoman Turkish: ویچه) or Vitz’e (Laz and Georgian: ვიწე, romanized: Viǯe) which some claim means "twig" or "branch" in the Laz language and was renamed Fındıklı ("place with hazelnuts" in Turkish) after the hazelnuts grown in the town, although these have now mostly been replaced with tea.

Scholar Özhan Öztürk claims that the town's former and native name comes from the word vis, meaning "town" in the now-extinct Thracian language and other Indo-European languages (Old Persian vith, Avesta visa, Sanskrit vesah, Gothic weihs, etc.). Öztürk claims that Istanbul's old name Byzantion; the town of Vize in Kırklareli Province in western Thracian region of Turkey; the towns of Viçe, Visir, Aşağı Viçe, Arhavi (Arkeo + Vice, "old town"), Visera, and Vizera in the Pontus region of Turkey (where Fındıklı is also located); the towns of Bizirne and Bizeri in the Paphlagonia region of Turkey; the towns of Visa, Visani, Viziru, and Vizireni in Romania; and the town of Vis in Bulgaria derive their names from the same origin.

== Geography ==
Like most Black Sea districts, Fındıklı consists of a small strip of coast and a larger area of hills and mountains behind (which lead up into the Kaçkar Mountains).

There is little flat land in Fındıklı and most of the population lives in two large valleys, the Çağlayan (Laz: აბუ, romanized: Abu) and the Arılı (Laz: ფიცხალა, romanized: Piʒxala). The climate is typical of the Black Sea coast, six months of dark cloud, four months overcast, six weeks of light cloud and 19 days of sunshine, with light rain at some point during every one of the 365 days of the year. These conditions are ideal for the crops that drive the local economy, namely tea, hazelnuts, and some other fruits. The town currently produces around 32,000 tons of tea and 750 tons of hazelnuts each year. Other produce include milk, meat, eggs, honey and fish, and the new development is the planting of kiwi fruit.

Fındıklı itself is a small market town of 9,980 people. There is little developed industry, and the younger generations regularly migrate away to jobs in larger cities. The town consists of 8 quarters: Aksu, Merkez (center), Tatlısu, Yenimahalle, Hürriyet, Ilıca, Liman and Sahil.

== Demographics ==
The population of the town itself is 10,886 as of 2021. The town and its district are predominantly ethnic Laz, with minority Hemshin, Turkish, and Posha populations.

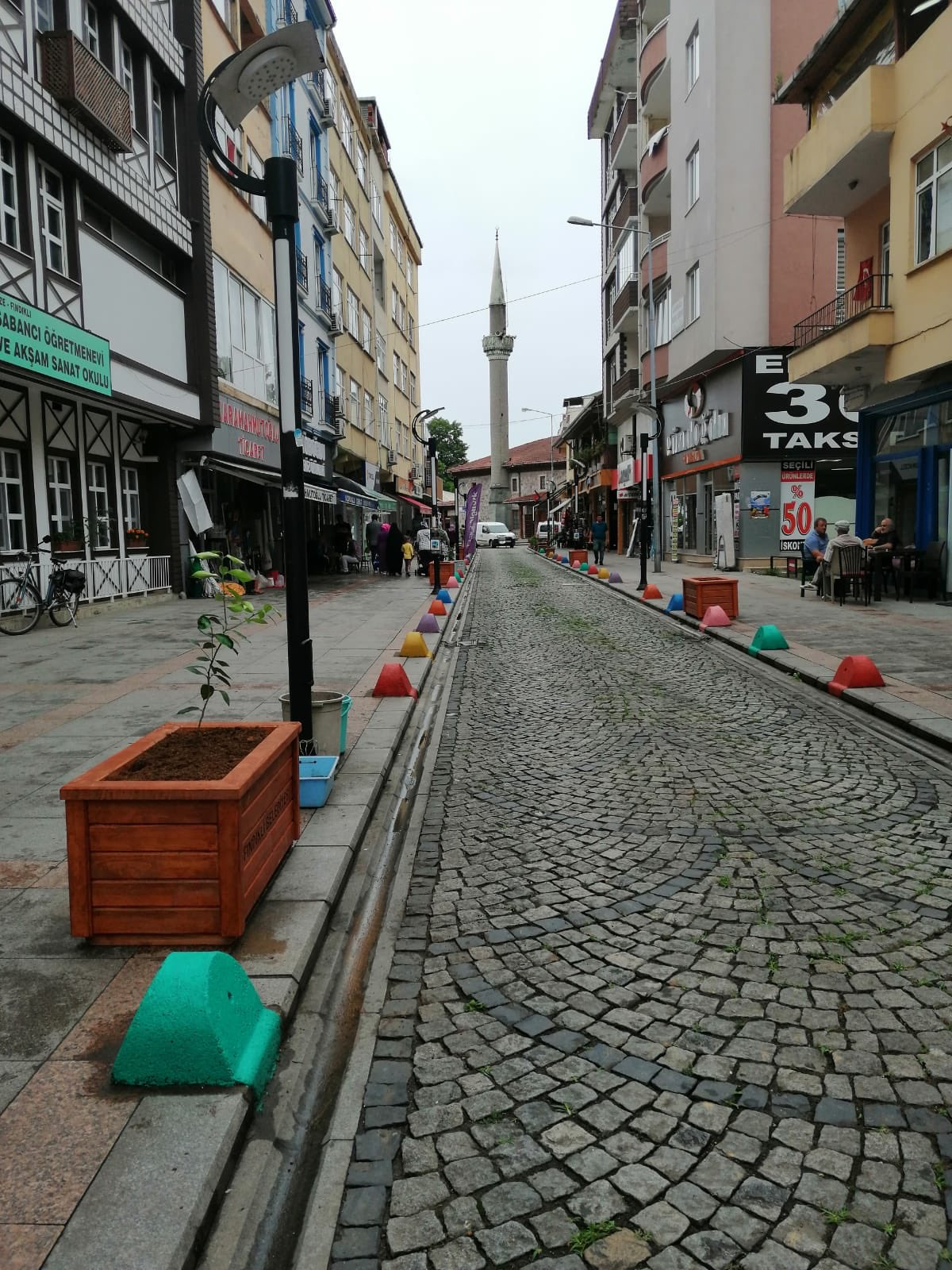
Fındıklı

== History ==
The area of Fındıklı has been controlled by Colchis i.e. Lazica, Pontus, Roman Empire, Kingdom of Georgia, Empire of Trebizond, and eventually brought into the Ottoman Empire in 1509. It was briefly occupied by Russia during World War I. During the Russian Civil War and Turkish War of Independence, the area was claimed by the newly declared Democratic Republic of Georgia. The Allies, however, were more interested in either creating a new Pontic state or giving the territory to Armenia, to whom it was awarded to in the Treaty of Sèvres. The treaty never went into effect, however, as the Allies including the Armenians were defeated by Atatürk’s forces, and the area was secured by Turkey in the Treaty of Lausanne.

== Twin towns ==
Fındıklı is twinned with:

- (Georgia (country)) Mtskheta, Georgia (2014)
