= Ardeşen =

Ardeşen Artashen
- Municipality
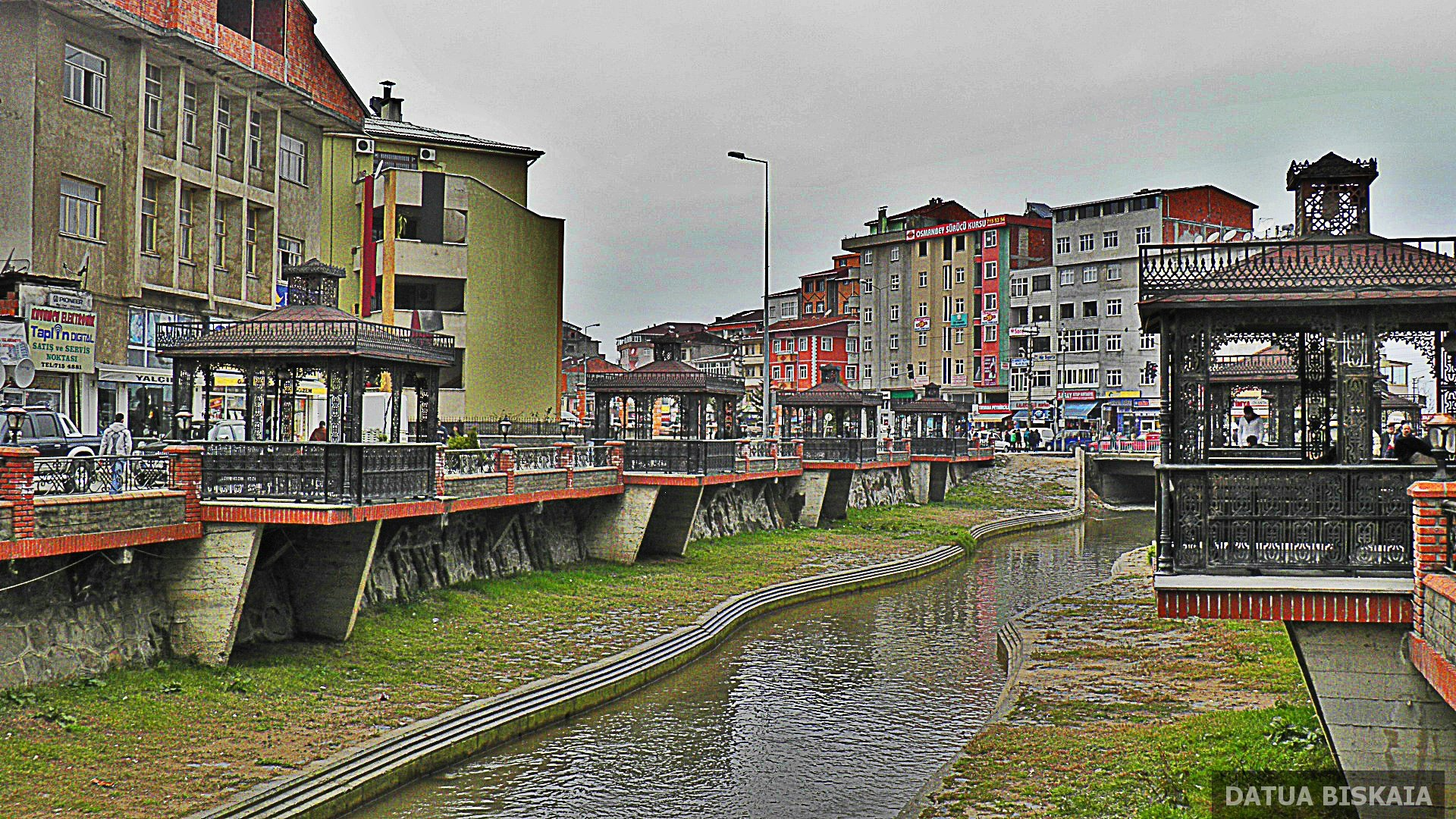
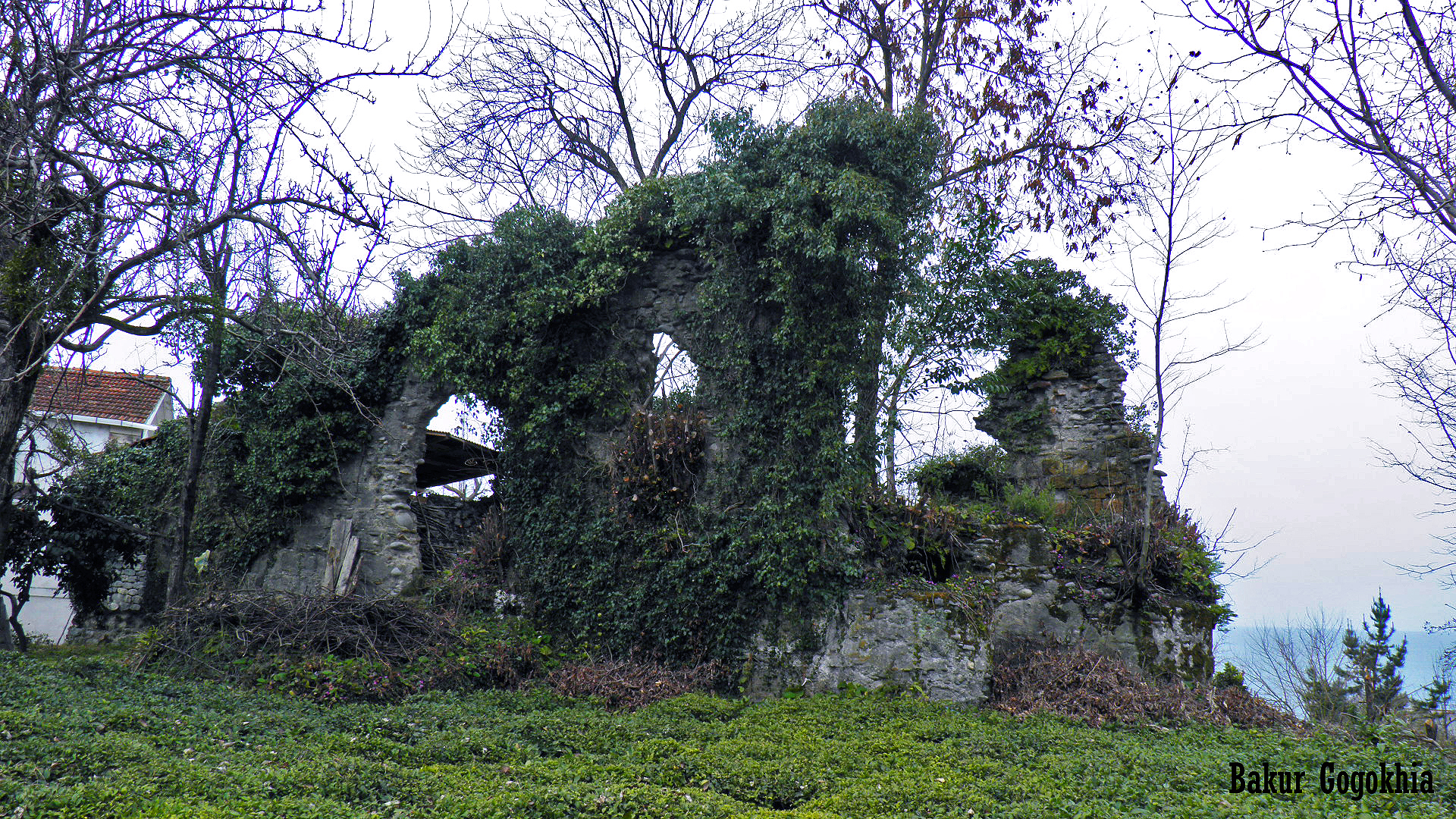
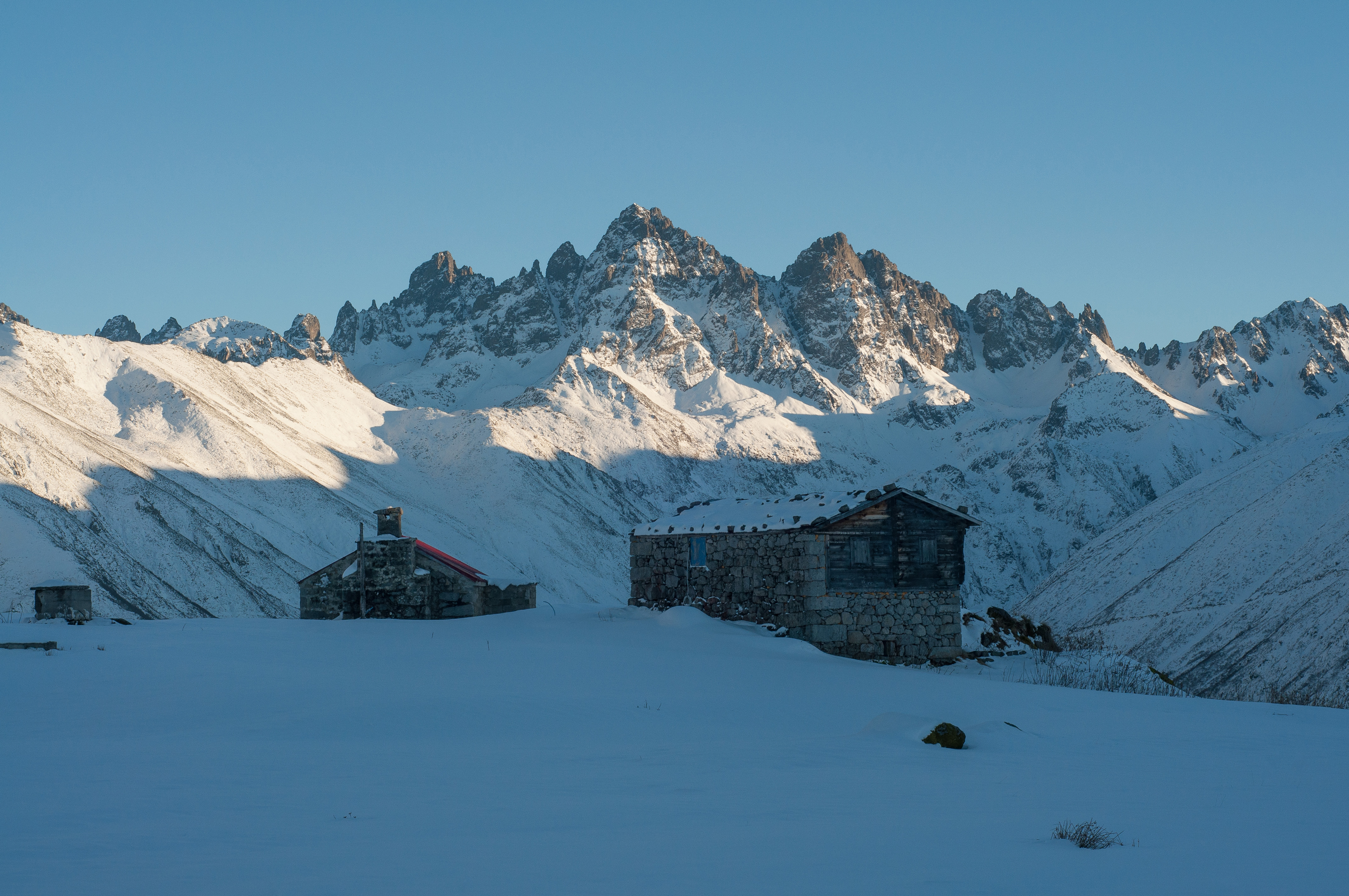
- Ardeşen Ruins of Ardeşen Church Sırt Plateau near Ardeşen

- Location within Turkey
- Coordinates: 41°11′24″N 40°58′59″E
- Country: Turkey
- Province: Rize
- District: Ardeşen

Government
  - Mayor: Enver Atagün (CHP)
- Area: 743 km^{2} (287 sq mi)
- Elevation: 27 m (89 ft)
- Population (2021): 30,645
  - Density: 41.2/km^{2} (107/sq mi)
- Time zone: UTC+3 (TRT)
- Postal code: 53400
- Climate: Cfb
- Website: ardesen.bel.tr

Ardeşen (Laz and Georgian: არტაშენი/Art'asheni or არდაშენი/Ardasheni; Armenian: Արտաշեն/Artashen) is a town in Rize Province in the Black Sea region of Turkey, 48 km (30 mi) along the coast road from the city of Rize. It is the seat of Ardeşen District. Its population is 30,645 (2021).

== History ==
See Rize Province for the history of the area, at one time part of the Colchis and Lazica kingdoms, Roman, Byzantine Empires and Kingdom of Georgia and later the Empire of Trebizond until their defeat in 1461 by the Ottoman Sultan Mehmed II. Explanations of the origin of the word Ardeşen in Armenian, Georgian and Laz have not yet been conclusive, but the root art̆a- in the name means fire in Persian. We also see this root in the surrounding districts. For example, Art̆anuci (Ardanuç).

== Geography ==
Ardeşen is sandwiched between sea and mountain, with 10 km (6.2 mi) of Black Sea coastline, while most of the district is hill and mountain, extending 50 km (31 mi) inland, up to the Altıparmak hills and then on to Çamlıhemşin and the Kaçkar Lazistan mountains. There is plenty of rainfall but little land flat enough for planting anything except for tea. life is hard in these wet highlands. The highland villages are remote and reaching them with roads, cables and other infrastructure is very challenging.

This was even more the case before tea planting began, when successive generations migrated away from the area to jobs in Turkey's larger cities or abroad. 10% of the land is used for tea growing, otherwise there is little agriculture except gardening for local consumption. The first tea-processing factory was opened in 1947; other industry includes sawmills and furniture workshops.

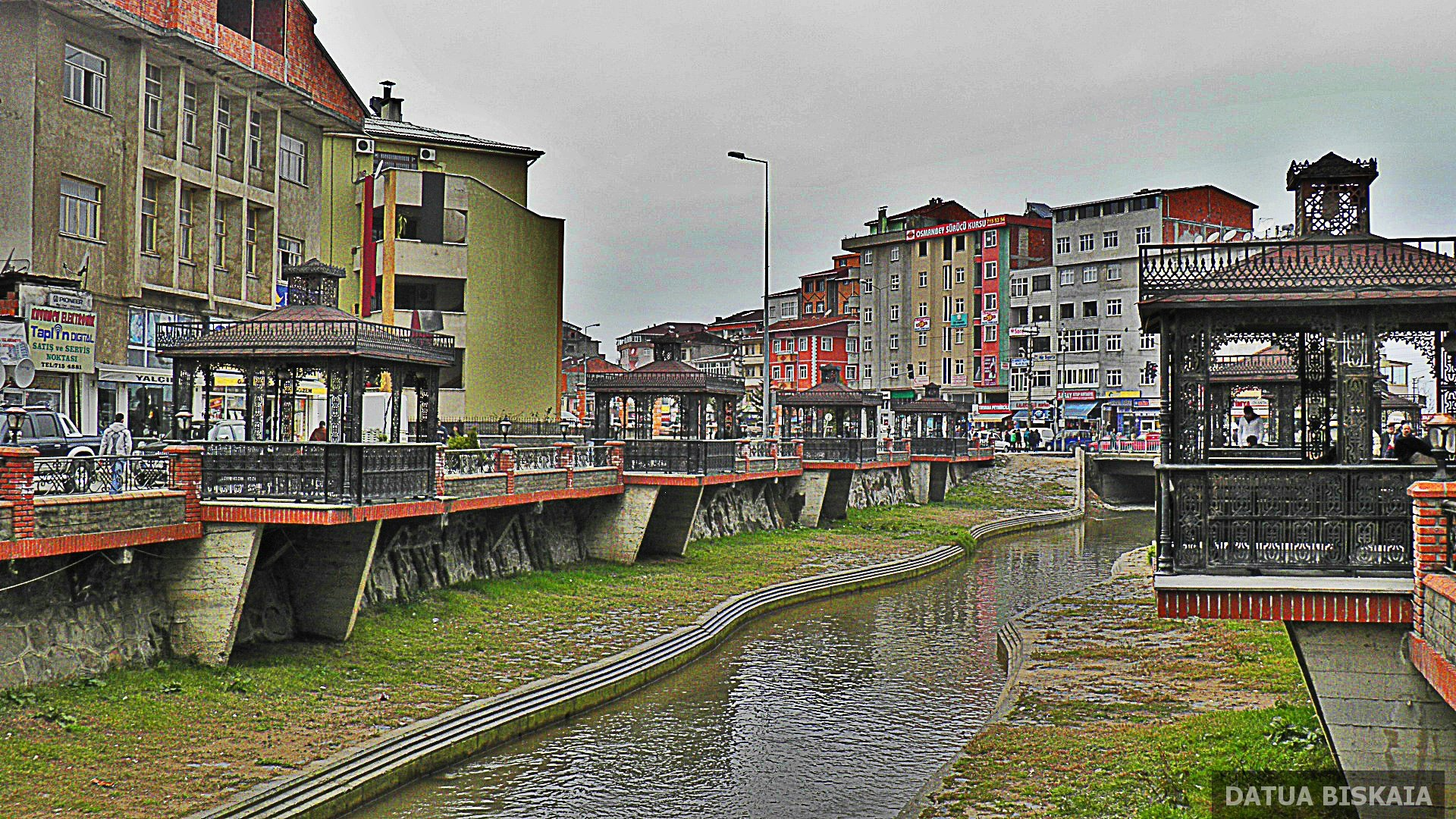
Ardeşen

The industrial development is in the town of Ardeşen itself, which is on the coast near the mouth of the Fırtına River. Ardeşen has a lot of public buildings and apartment blocks. The busy coast road through Ardeşen leads up to Turkey's border with Georgia. The cuisine is like the typical Turkish menu, but there are a lot of foods typical for the region like minci / cökelek or muhlama, to mention only some of the rich cuisine of Ardeşen. Ardeşen has some local radio, TV and newspapers, like Ardeşen'in Sesi.

The income from tea growing has brought more amenities to Ardeşen but the traditional rural lifestyle persists; many of the people in the countryside are ethnic Laz and the older generations in particular continue to speak the Laz language, although their traditional clothing has disappeared with the ban on growing hemp. Education, however, is quite successful, with literacy rates of 97% among men and 89% among women.

The people of Ardeşen are known for carryuing firearms. home-made small arms are a thriving trade, to such an extent that in 1991 the state established a factory to produce them legally and try to bring the industry under control. Even the municipality logo features a picture of a mosque and a revolver.

The municipality consists of the following 23 quarters: Bahar, Başmahalle, Cami, Düz, Elmalık, Kahveciler, Kavaklıdere, Kuzey, Merkez, Müftü, Şentepe, Yayla, Yenimahalle, Barış, Deniz, Fırtına, Çiftekavak, Işıklı, Yavuzselim, Cumhuriyet, Fatih, Konaktepe and Taşbaşı.

== Climate ==
Ardeşen has an oceanic climate (Köppen: Cfb).

Climate data for Ardeşen
Month	Jan	Feb	Mar	Apr	May	Jun	Jul	Aug	Sep	Oct	Nov	Dec	Year
Daily mean °C (°F)	6.6 (43.9)	6.9 (44.4)	8.1 (46.6)	11.9 (53.4)	15.5 (59.9)	19.4 (66.9)	21.7 (71.1)	21.8 (71.2)	19.4 (66.9)	15.6 (60.1)	12.1 (53.8)	8.5 (47.3)	14.0 (57.2)
Average precipitation mm (inches)	194 (7.6)	142 (5.6)	118 (4.6)	85 (3.3)	79 (3.1)	140 (5.5)	121 (4.8)	156 (6.1)	200 (7.9)	249 (9.8)	217 (8.5)	224 (8.8)	1,925 (75.6)
Source: Climate-Data.org

== Sport ==
The Ardeşen GSK, a women's handball club, play in the Turkish Women's Handball Super League.

The town has multiple football clubs, the main one being Ardeşenspor.

== Places of interest ==
- Fırtına Deresi, a river running down from the Kaçkars, is used for rafting.
- Tunca (Dutxe), where the 'formulaz' traditional car races take place.
