= Maselevat Waterfalls =

Coordinates: 41.04602°N 41.00469°E

- Location: Çamlıhemşin District, Rize Province
- Total height: 25 m

Maselevat Waterfalls (Laz language: Ketekalivi Waterfalls), are a group of waterfalls located in the Çamlıhemşin District of Rize Province. Their source is Fırtına River. Maselevat Waterfalls, consisting of three waterfalls, flow through hornbeam, pine and spruce trees.
