= Çayırdüzü, Çamlıhemşin =

Çayırdüzü Ghvandi (Laz language)
- Village
- Country: Turkey
- Province: Rize
- District: Çamlıhemşin
- Elevation: 797 m (2,615 ft)
- Population (2021): 752
- Time zone: UTC+3 (TRT)

Çayırdüzü is a village in the Çamlıhemşin District, Rize Province, in the Black Sea Region of Turkey. Its population is 752 (2021).

== History ==
According to list of villages in Laz language book (2009), name of the village is Ghvandi. Most villagers are ethnically Laz.

== Geography ==
The village is located 9 kilometres (5.6 mi) away from Çamlıhemşin.
