= Komilo =

Komilo ქომილო (Laz language)
- Village
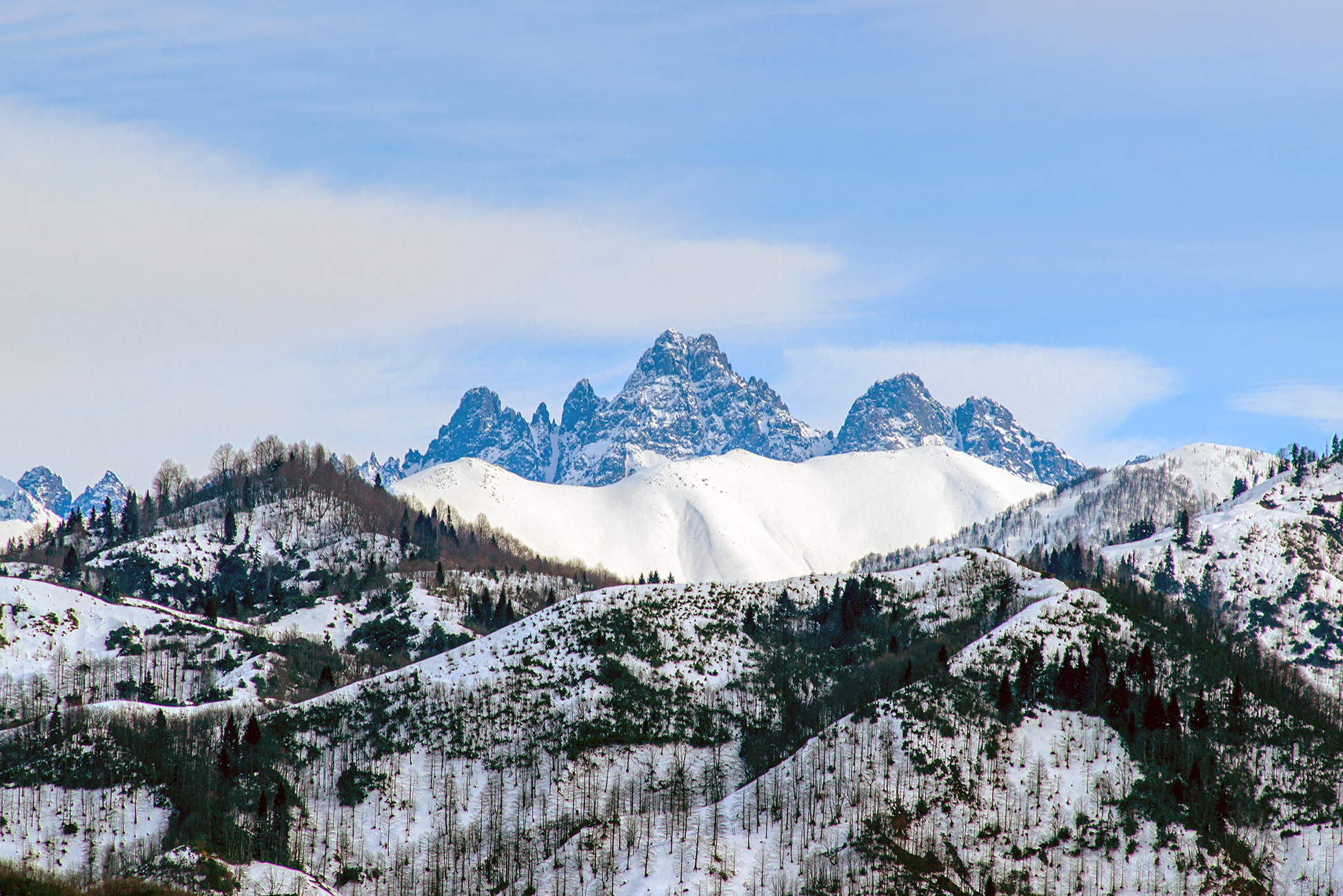

- Location within Turkey
- Coordinates: 41°04′14″N 41°00′03″E
- Country: Turkey
- Province: Rize
- District: Çamlıhemşin
- Elevation: 295 m (968 ft)
- Population (2021): 238
- Time zone: UTC+3 (TRT)

Komilo (before 2015: Murat) is a village in the Çamlıhemşin District, Rize Province, in the Black Sea Region of Turkey. Its population is 238 (2021).

== History ==
According to list of villages in Laz language book (2009), name of the village is Komilo, which means "goddess" in Laz language. It is the first Laz village in Turkey that regained its Laz name as official name. Most villagers are ethnically Laz.

== Geography ==
The village is located 5 kilometres (3.1 mi) away from Çamlıhemşin.
