= Dikkaya, Çamlıhemşin =

Dikkaya Mek'alesk'iriti (Laz language)
- Village
- Country: Turkey
- Province: Rize
- District: Çamlıhemşin
- Elevation: 526 m (1,726 ft)
- Population (2021): 1,004
- Time zone: UTC+3 (TRT)

Dikkaya is a village in the Çamlıhemşin District, Rize Province, in the Black Sea Region of Turkey. Its population is 1,004 as of 2021.

== History ==
According to list of villages in Laz language book (2009), name of the village is Mek'alesk'iriti, which means "seize a place". Most villagers are ethnically Laz.

== Geography ==
The village is located 6 km (3.7 mi) away from Çamlıhemşin.
