= Behice, Çamlıhemşin =

Behice
- Village
- Location in Turkey
- Coordinates: 41°05′11″N 41°02′05″E
- Country: Turkey
- Province: Rize
- District: Çamlıhemşin
- Elevation: 764 m (2,507 ft)
- Population (2021): 446
- Time zone: UTC+3 (TRT)

Behice is a village in the Çamlıhemşin District, Rize Province, in the Black Sea Region of Turkey. Its population is 446 (2021).

== History ==
Most villagers are ethnically Laz.

== Geography ==
The village is located 6 kilometres (3.7 mi) away from Çamlıhemşin.
