= Güllüköy, Çamlıhemşin =

Güllüköy Zibari (Laz language)
- Village
- Country: Turkey
- Province: Rize
- District: Çamlıhemşin
- Elevation: 326 m (1,070 ft)
- Population (2021): 285
- Time zone: UTC+3 (TRT)

Güllüköy is a village in the Çamlıhemşin District, Rize Province, in the Black Sea Region of Turkey. Its population is 285 (2021).

== History ==
According to list of villages in Laz language book (2009), name of the village is Zibari. Most villagers are ethnically Laz.

== Geography ==
The village is located 8 kilometres (5.0 mi) away from Çamlıhemşin.
