= Topluca, Çamlıhemşin =

Topluca Chano (Laz language)
- Village
- Location in Turkey
- Coordinates: 41°3′53″N 41°1′24″E
- Country: Turkey
- Province: Rize
- District: Çamlıhemşin
- Elevation: 786 m (2,579 ft)
- Population (2021): 1,022
- Time zone: UTC+3 (TRT)

Topluca is a village in the Çamlıhemşin District, Rize Province, in the Black Sea Region of Turkey. Its population is 1,022 (2021).

== History ==
According to list of villages in Laz language book (2009), name of the village is Mtsano, which is derived from Laz word Mtsana, which means "sparrow". Most villagers are ethnically Laz. It is the second most crowded Laz village in Rize.

== Geography ==
The village is located 5 kilometres (3.1 mi) away from Çamlıhemşin.
