= Ayder =

Summer resort in Turkey

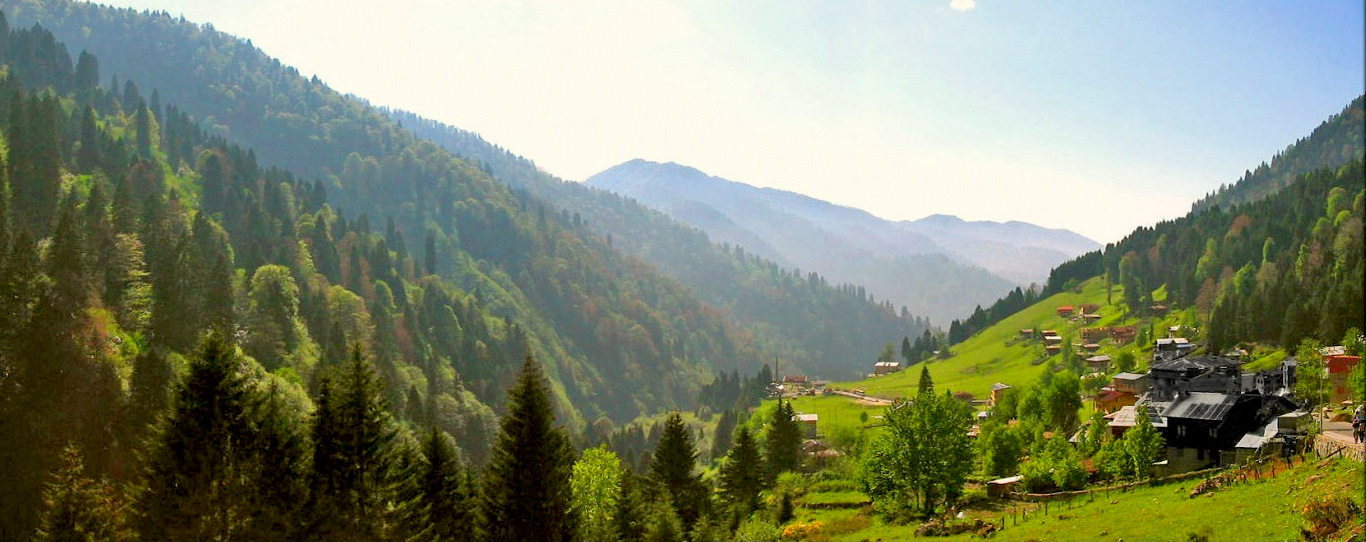

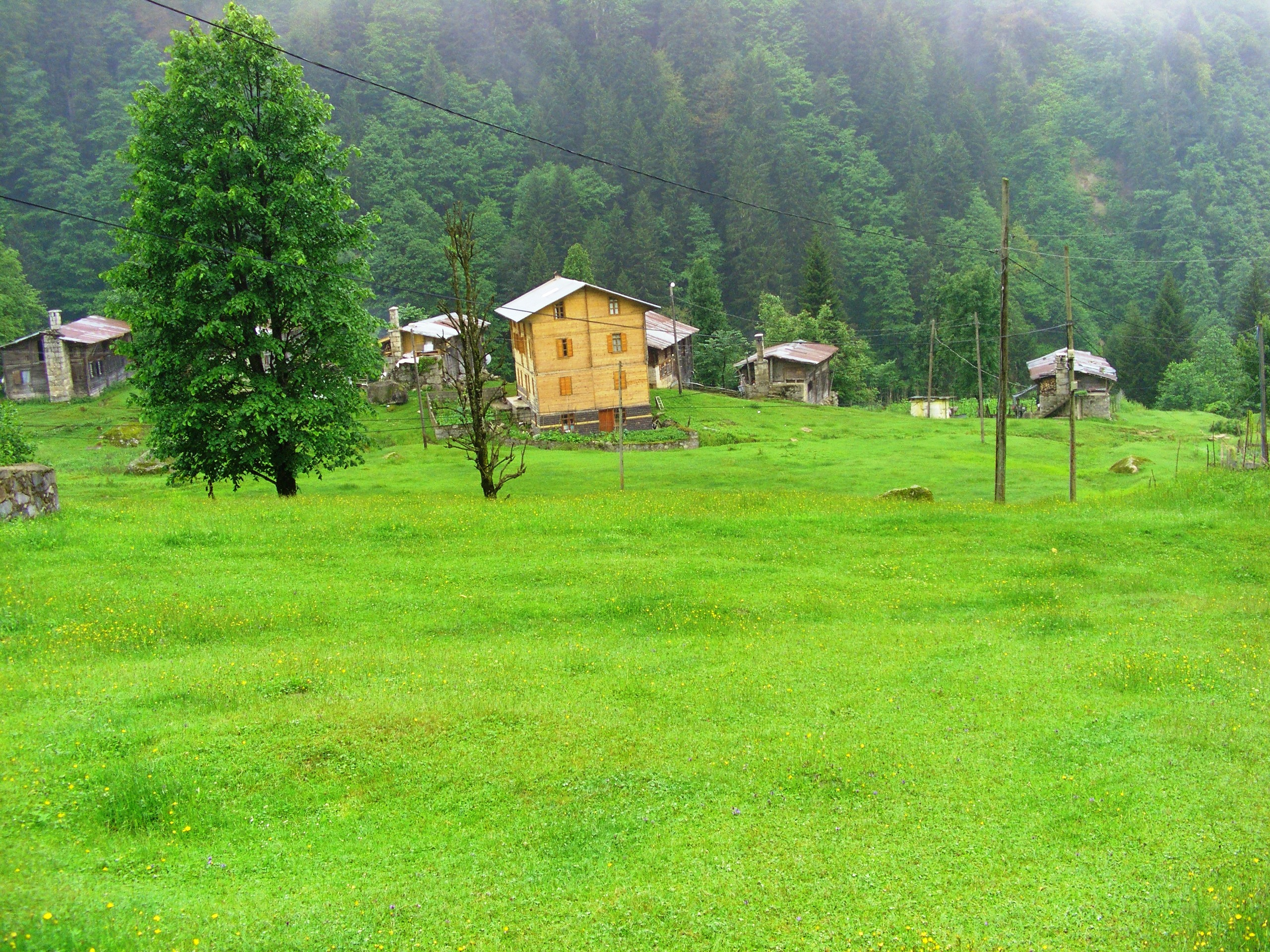

Ayder is a yayla in Rize Province, Turkey.

== Etymology ==
Ayder is the Hemshin word for "fields."

== Geography ==
Ayder at 40°57′N 41°05′E is a typical yayla with no settled population; it hosts visitors during summers. The average altitude is 1,350 metres (4,430 ft). It is a part of Çamlıhemşin District of Rize Province. The distance to Çamlıhemşin is 17 kilometres (11 mi) and to Rize is 88 kilometres (55 mi).

== As a resort ==
Although well known locally, the first mention of Ayder in official papers was in 1871 when the hot springs in Ayder were noted. The temperature of the water is 55^{0}C (131^{0}F). However, the most attractive feature of Ayder is its dense forestry and a number of waterfalls nearby. In 1987 the location was declared a tourist center by the government.

Ayder is famous for its rhododendron honey, which is produced in beehives hung on trees. It is also famous for its trout, which is farmed in abundance between Ayder and Çamlıhemşin.
