= Köprübaşı, Çamlıhemşin =

Köprübaşı Abishxo (Laz language)
- Village
- Location in Turkey
- Coordinates: 41.0741°N 41.0108°E
- Country: Turkey
- Province: Rize
- District: Çamlıhemşin
- Elevation: 508 m (1,667 ft)
- Population (2021): 254
- Time zone: UTC+3 (TRT)

Köprübaşı is a village in the Çamlıhemşin District, Rize Province, in the Black Sea Region of Turkey. Its population is 254 (2021).

== History ==
According to list of villages in Laz language book (2009), name of the village is Abichxo. Most villagers are ethnically Laz.

== Geography ==
The village is located 3 kilometres (1.9 mi) away from Çamlıhemşin.
