= Zilkale =

Castle in Turkey

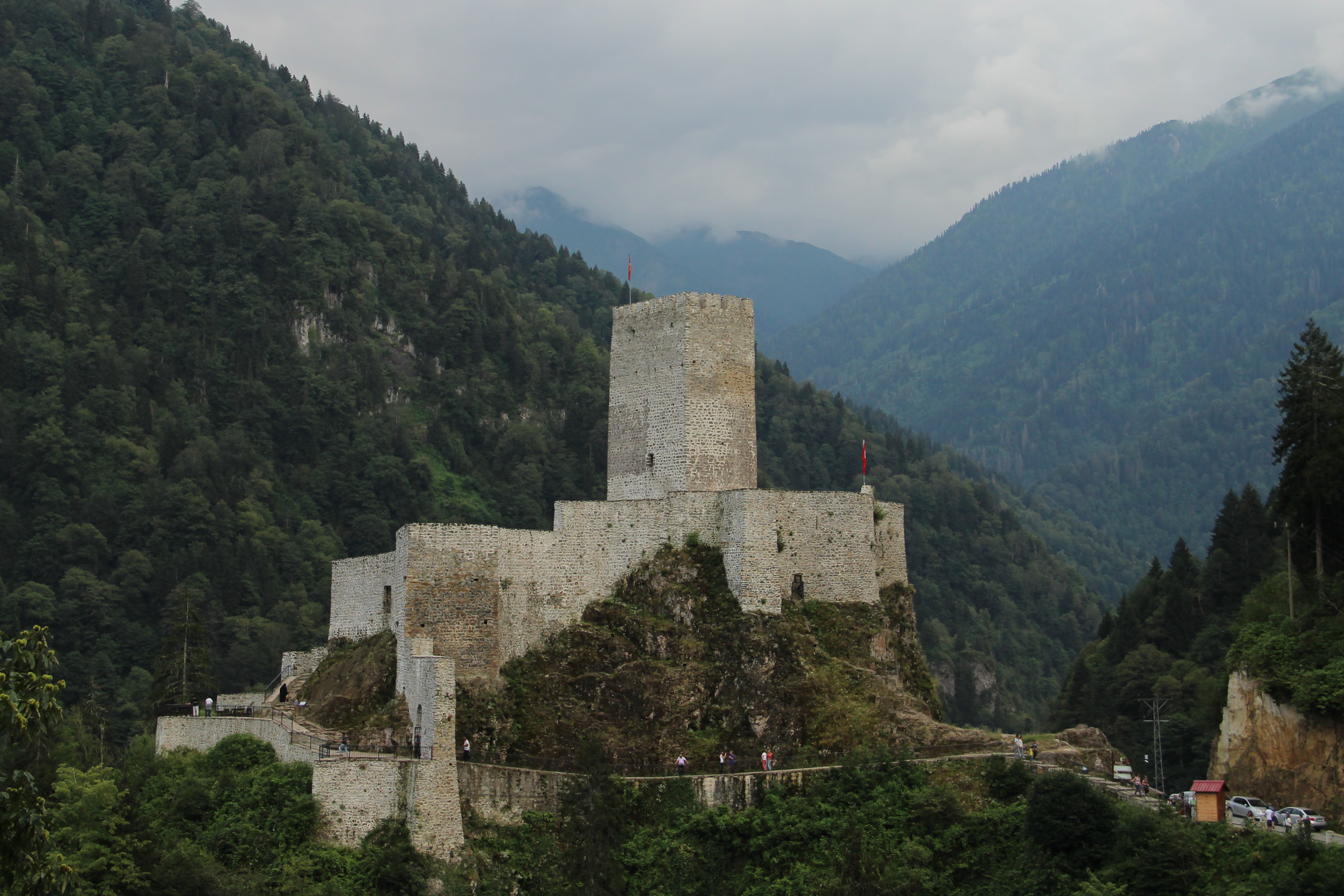
- Ramparts of Zilkale

- Location within Turkey

General information
- Type: Castle
- Location: Fırtına River Valley, Çamlıhemşin, Rize Province, Turkey
- Coordinates: 40.9589845°N 40.9622112°E
- Elevation: 1,130 m (3,710 ft)
- Completed: 14th-15th century

Zilkale is a medieval castle located in the Fırtına Valley (literally "Storm Valley") within the Pontic Mountains, and is one of the most important historical structures in the Çamlıhemşin district of Rize Province, within the Black Sea Region of Turkey.

The castle is built at an altitude of 1,130 m (3,710 ft), and sits at the edge of a cliff overlooking the Fırtına River (Turkish: Fırtına Deresi) approximately 380 m (1,250 ft) below, running at an elevation of 750 m (2,460 ft) southeast of it.

In the 1st-4th centuries AD it was the capital of the Laz principality of Macron-Henochi. The castle consists of the outer walls, middle walls and the inner castle. There are garrison quarters, and a possible chapel and head tower.

== Etymology ==
Zilkale: Zil means "bell" and kale means "castle" in Turkish (Zilkale = "Bell Castle").

Alternatively:

Zirkale: Zir means "lower" in Persian and kale means "castle" in Turkish (Zirkale = "Lower Castle").
