= Topluca =

Topluca may refer to the following settlements in Turkey:

- Topluca, Bartın, a village in Bartın Province
- Topluca, Çamlıhemşin, a village in Rize Province
- Topluca, Mut, a neighbourhood in Mersin Province
- Topluca, Pazar, a village in Rize Province
- Topluca, Sason, a village in Batman Province
