= Köprübaşı =

Köprübaşı (literally "bridgehead") is a Turkish place name and may refer to the following places:

== Districts ==
- Köprübaşı, Manisa
- Köprübaşı, Trabzon

== Villages ==
(alphabetical by province, then district)

- Köprübaşı, Sason, Batman Province
- Köprübaşı, Mengen, Bolu Province
- Köprübaşı, Ezine, Çanakkale Province
- Köprübaşı, Kargı, Çorum Province
- Köprübaşı, Mecitözü, Çorum Province
- Köprübaşı, Kale, Denizli Province
- Köprübaşı, Sarayköy, Denizli Province
- Köprübaşı, Düzce, Düzce Province
- Köprübaşı, Tercan, Erzincan Province
- Köprübaşı, Olur, Erzurum Province
- Köprübaşı, Kızıltepe, Mardin Province
- Köprübaşı, Anamur, Mersin Province
- Köprübaşı, Çamlıhemşin, Rize Province
- Köprübaşı, Vezirköprü, Samsun Province
- Köprübaşı, Siirt, Siirt Province

== Other places ==
- Köprübaşı Dam, in Zonguldak Province
