= Fırtına River bridges =

The Fırtına River bridges are a group of more than 20 well-preserved Ottoman-era bridges over the Fırtına river and its tributaries near Çamlıhemşin in Rize Province at the eastern end of Turkey's Black Sea coast.

Because of the steep-sided valleys and frequent floods, the bridges have characteristically high arches.

Many of the bridges date from the 18th and 19th centuries, but some may be older. It is thought they were built by stonemasons from the local community, working under the direction of central Ottoman authorities.

The bridges include:

- Çamlıhemşin Bridge
- Kaptanpaşa Bridge, not dated, but 18th- or 19th-century in style, near the village of Yeşiltepe
- Buzlupınar Bridge, not dated, but 19th-century in style, in the village of Buzlupınar
- Köprüköy Bridge, date stone unreadable, but 19th-century in style
- Şenyuva (Cin Civa) Bridge, dated 1696 or 1699 by an inscription that was lost during a 1946 flood
- Mikron Bridge, mid 19th-century; arches, side walls and fill repaired in 1998
- Ardeşen Bridge, late 19th-century construction of dressed and uncut stone, now in poor condition

Several similar bridges in nearby valleys are also notable

- Çağlayan Bridge (Fındıklı)
- Güneyce Bridge (İkizdere)
- Dörtgözlü Bridge (Pazar)
Fırtına River bridges from the Ottoman era
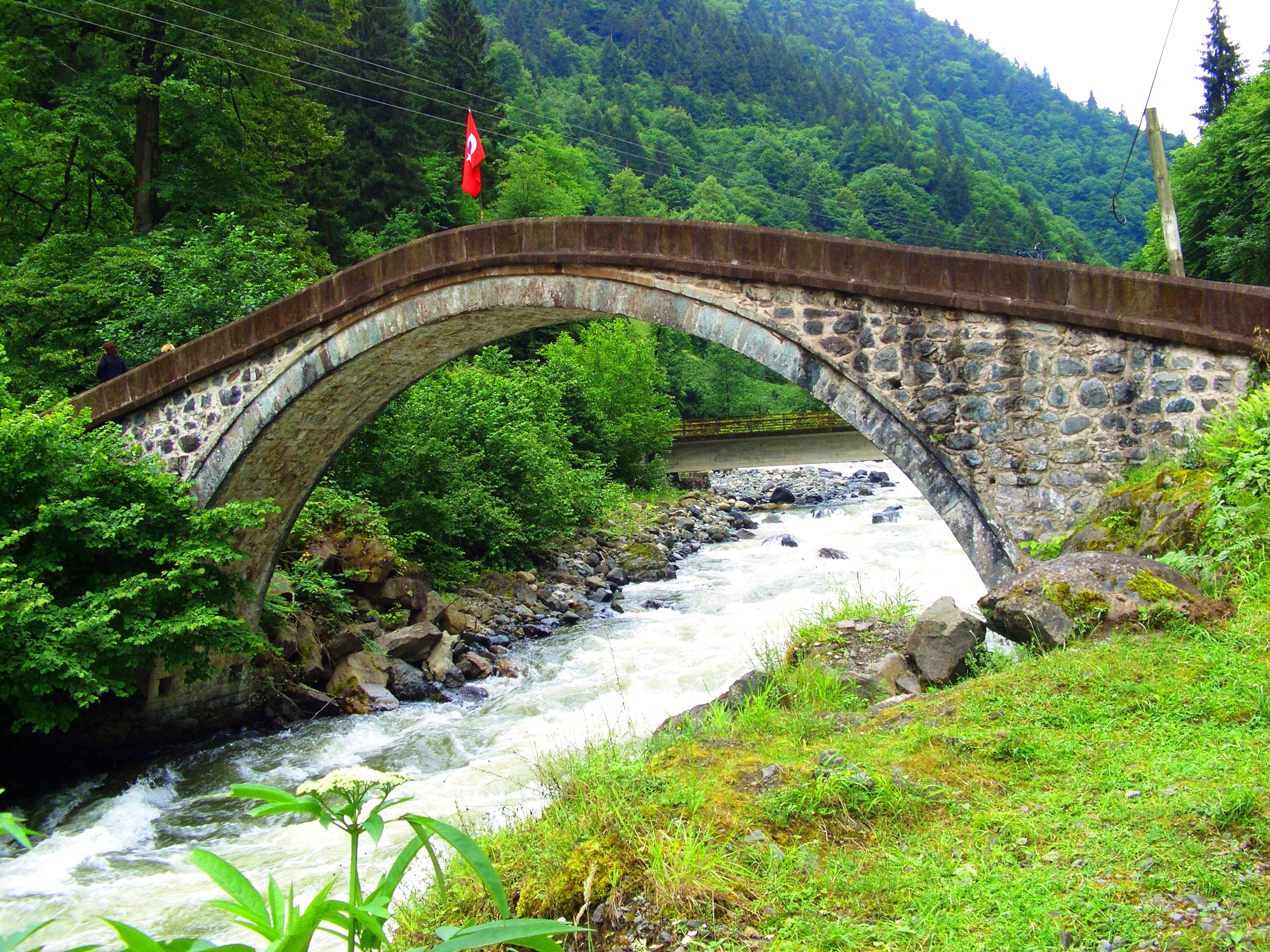
Ottoman arched bridge over the Fırtına river.

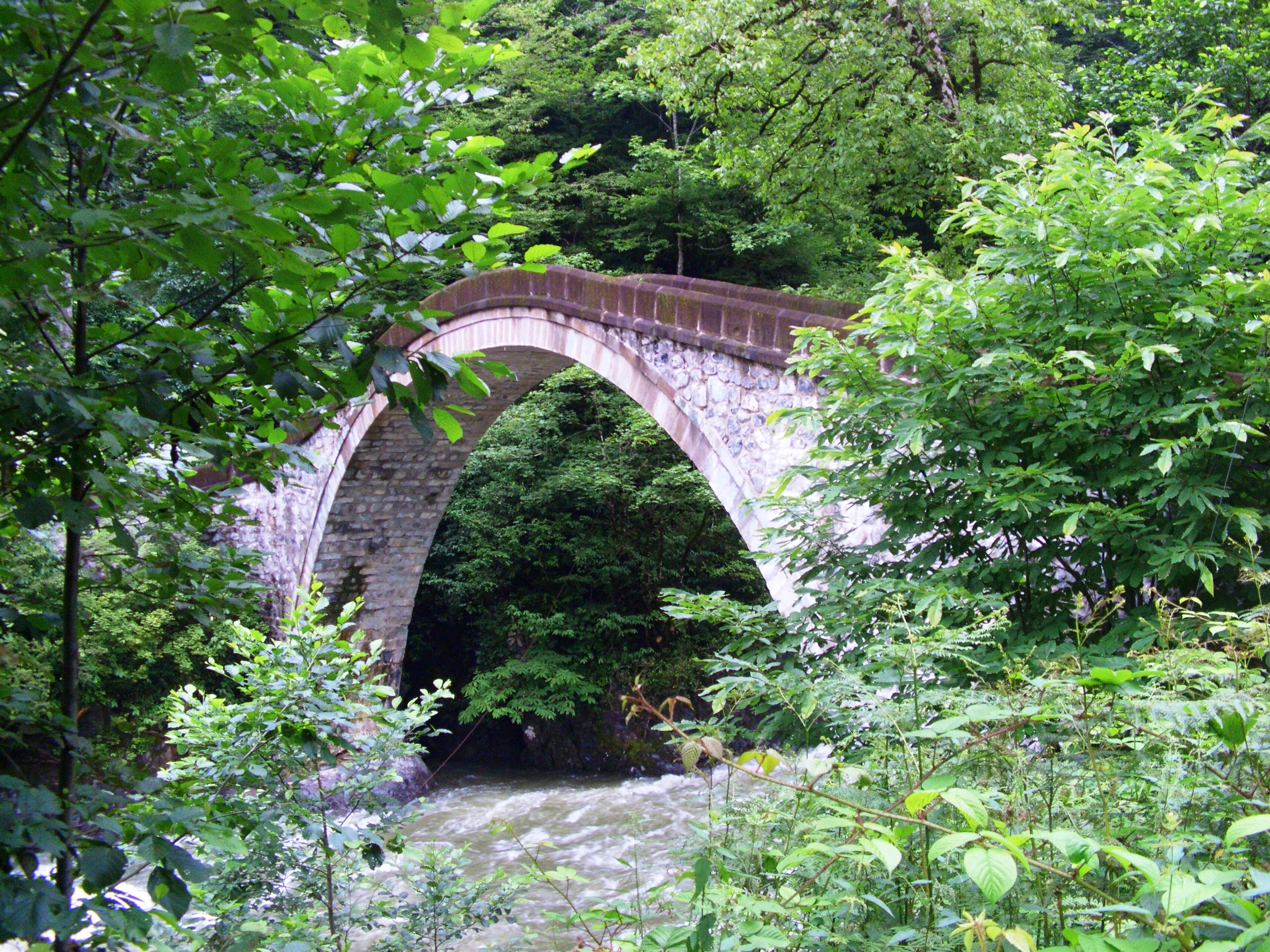
Mikron Bridge.

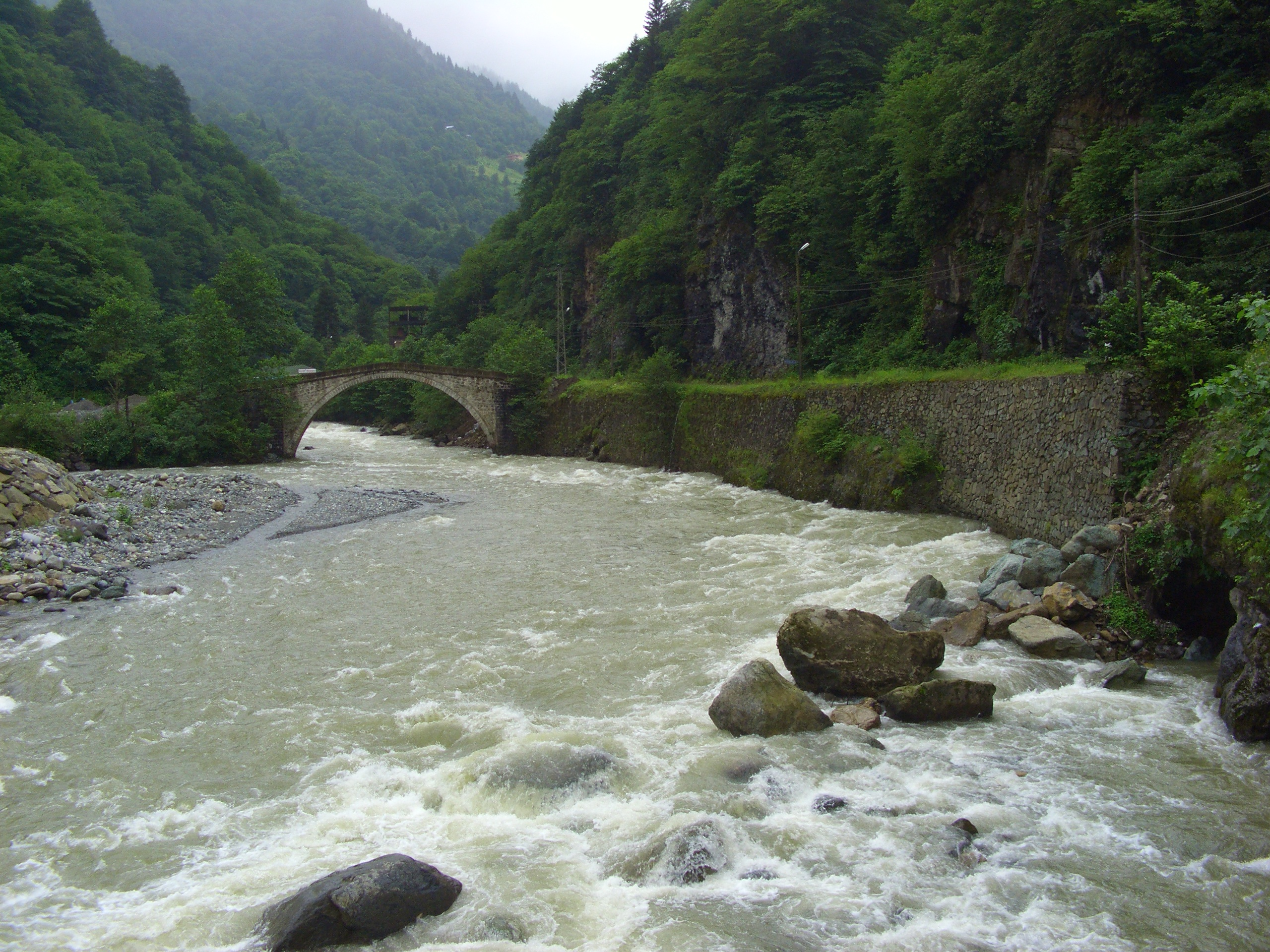
Çamlıhemşin Bridge (near Çamlıhemşin).

== Sources ==
- "Kaptanpaşa Köprüsü". 7 February 2008. Archived from the original on 30 October 2013.
- "Turkey's many historical bridges targeted in restoration effort". ECO Cultural Institute. 23 June 2009.
- Ayliffe, Rosie (2003), Rough Guide to Turkey (5 ed.), Rough Guides, ISBN 978-1-84353-071-8
- Altunişik, Ahmet Can; Bayraktar, Alemdar; Sevim, Barış; Birinci, Fatma (16 June 2011). "Vibration-based operational modal analysis of the Mikron historic arch bridge after restoration". Civil Engineering and Environmental Systems. 28 (3). Taylor & Francis: 247–259. Bibcode:2011CEES...28..247A. doi:10.1080/10286608.2011.588328. S2CID 109336411.
- Yale, Pat; Carillet, Jean-Bernard; Maxwell, Virginia (2005), Turkey (9 ed.), Lonely Planet, p. 534, ISBN 978-1-74059-683-1
