= Fırtına River =

River in Turkey

Coordinates: 41°11′21″N 40°57′42″E

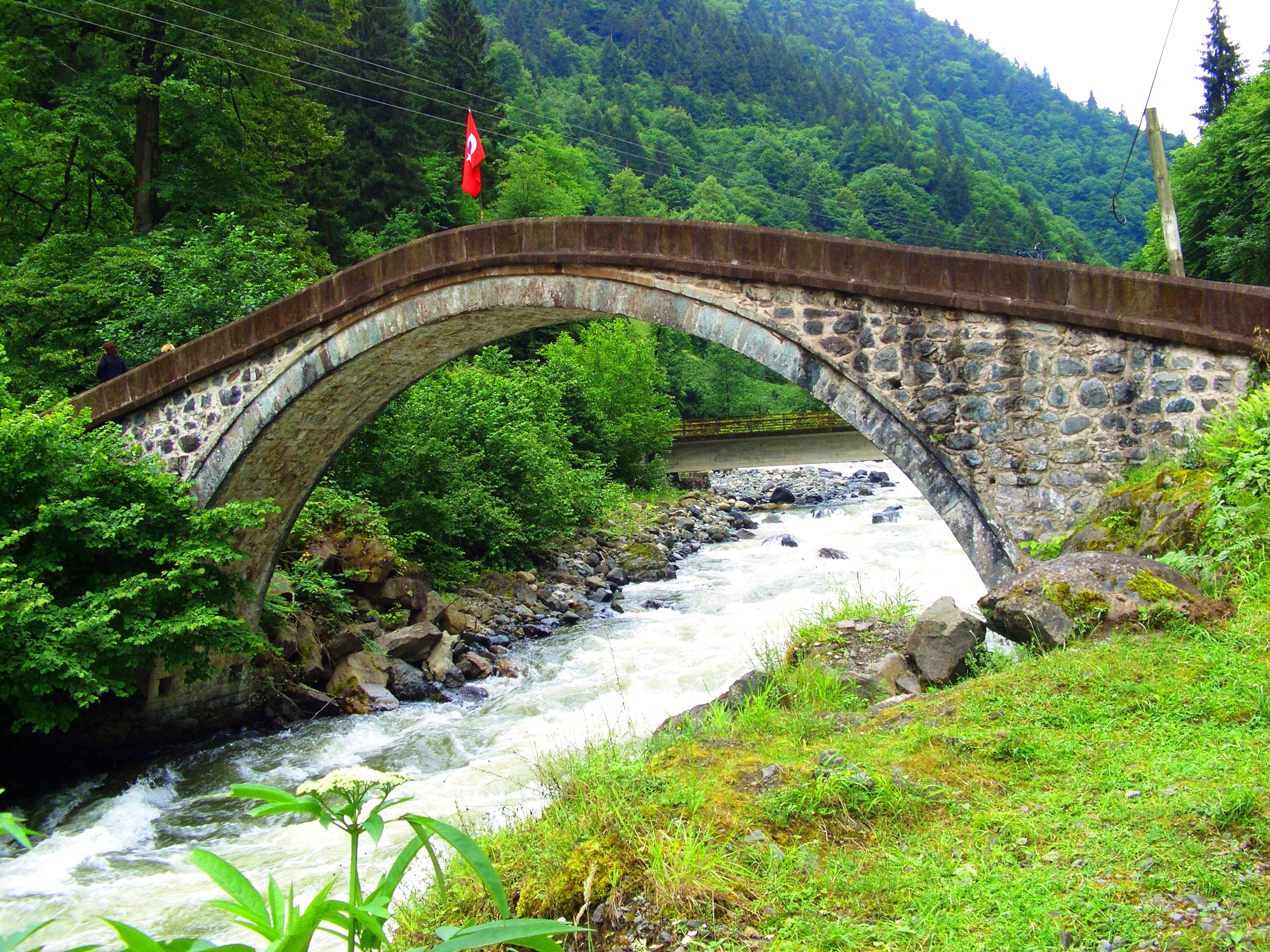

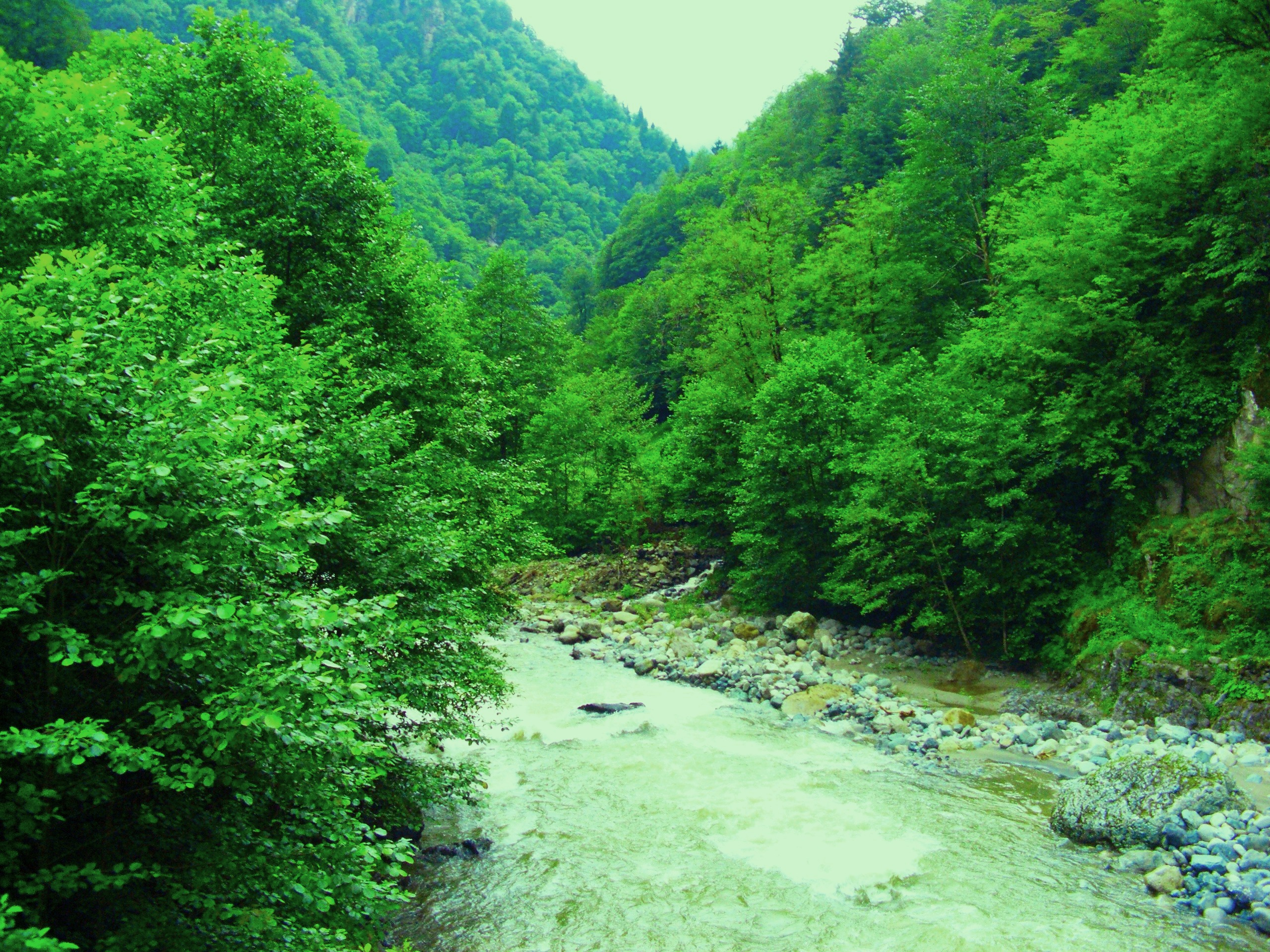

Fırtına or Peruma is one of the main water streams of Rize Province in the eastern Black Sea Region of Turkey. Its name is Turkish for "storm water". There is a group of more than 20 well-preserved Ottoman-era bridges over the Fırtına Deresi.

== Description ==
The Fırtına Deresi rises in Kaçkar Mountains in Rize Province and flows to the Black Sea, passing Çamlıhemşin and Ardeşen. It is 68 kilometres (42 mi) long.

== See also ==
- Fırtına River bridges
