= Çamlıhemşin District =

District of Rize Province, Turkey

- District
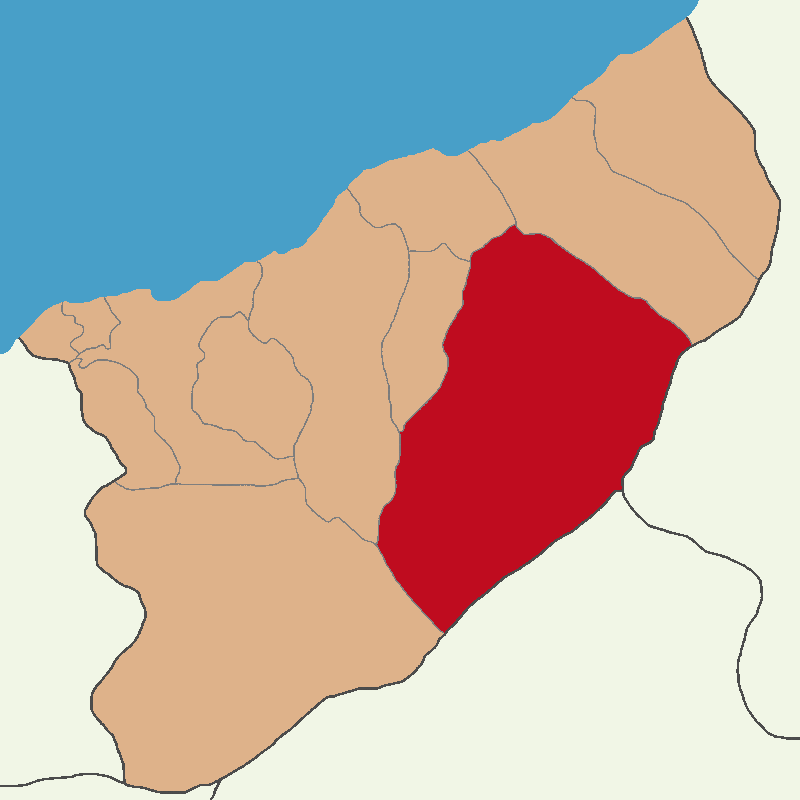
- Map showing Çamlıhemşin District in Rize Province

- Location in Turkey
- Coordinates: 40°56′N 41°02′E
- Country: Turkey
- Province: Rize
- Seat: Çamlıhemşin

Government
  - Kaymakam: Hakan Öznay
- Area: 897 km^{2} (346 sq mi)
- Population (2021): 6,929
  - Density: 7.7/km^{2} (20/sq mi)
- Time zone: UTC+3 (TRT)
- Website: www.camlihemsin.gov.tr

Çamlıhemşin District is a district of the Rize Province of Turkey. Its seat is the town of Çamlıhemşin. Its area is 897 km^{2}, and its population is 6,929 (2021).

== Composition ==
There is one municipality in Çamlıhemşin District:

- Çamlıhemşin

There are 26 villages in Çamlıhemşin District:

- Behice
- Boğaziçi
- Çatköy
- Çayırdüzü
- Derecik
- Didi
- Dikkaya
- Güllüköy
- Güroluk
- Kale
- Komilo
- Köprübaşı
- Meydanköy
- Mollaveyis
- Ortaklar
- Ortanköy
- Ortayayla
- Sıraköy
- Şenköy
- Şenyuva
- Topluca
- Yaylaköy
- Yazlık
- Yolkıyı
- Yukarışimşirli
- Zilkale
