= Çamlıhemşin =

- Municipality
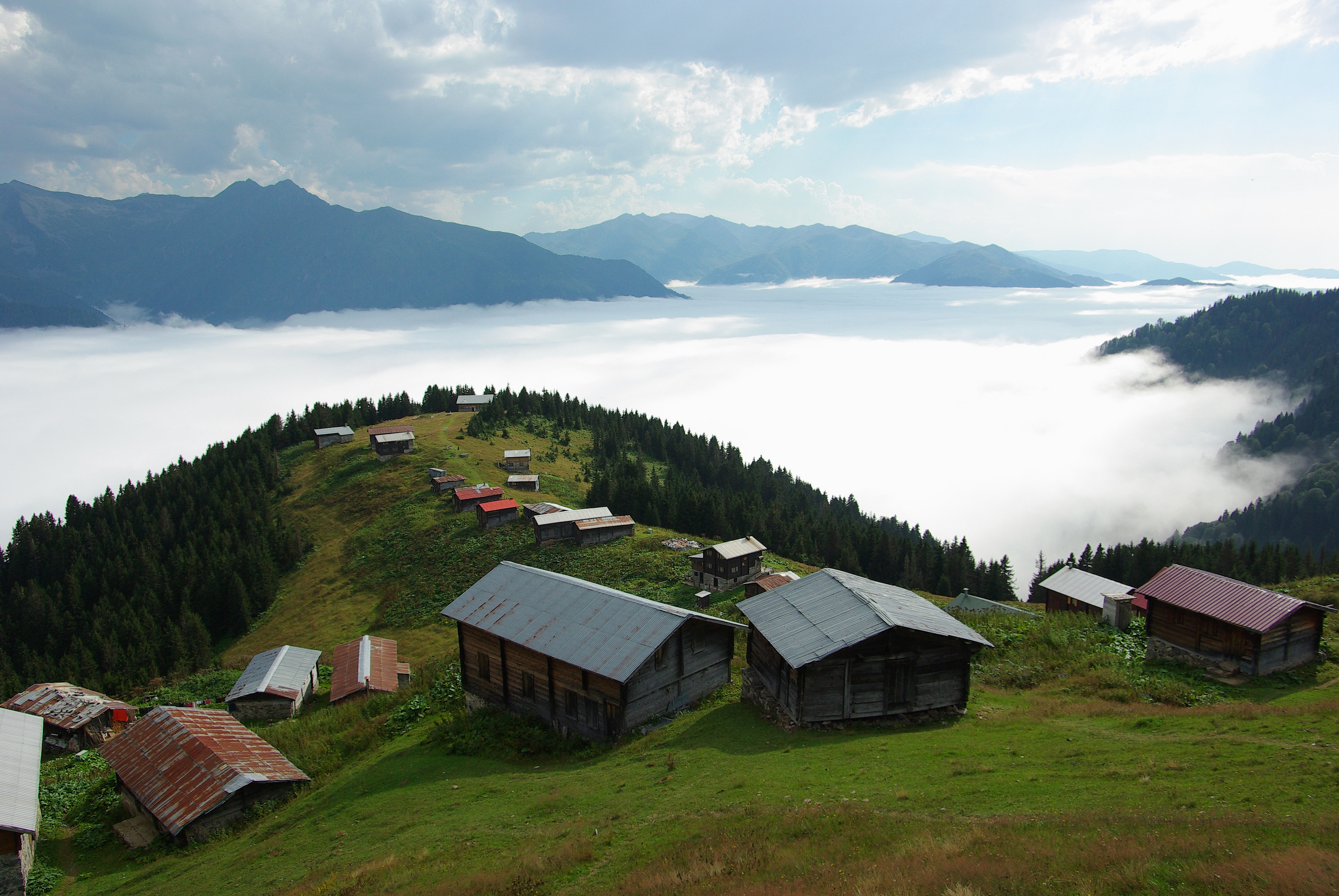
- Pokut plateau. Clouds above the mountains of Rize

- Location within Turkey
- Coordinates: 41°02′50″N 41°00′20″E
- Country: Turkey
- Province: Rize
- District: Çamlıhemşin

Government
  - Mayor: Osman Haşimoğlu (AKP)
- Elevation: 300 m (980 ft)
- Population (2021): 1,763
- Time zone: UTC+3 (TRT)
- Area code: 0464
- Climate: Cfb
- Website: camlihemsin.bel.tr

Çamlıhemşin, formerly Vice, (Laz: ვიჯა Vica Laz pronunciation: [ˈvid͡ʒa] or Laz: ვიჯე Vice Laz pronunciation: [ˈvid͡ʒe]; Georgian: ვიჯა Vija Georgian pronunciation: [vid͡ʒa]) is a small town in Rize Province in the Black Sea region of Turkey. It is the seat of Çamlıhemşin District. Its population is 1,763 (2021).

With its mountains and valleys, Çamlıhemşin has a reputation as one of the most attractive parts of the eastern Black Sea region according to CNN,particularly during and thanks to its autumn foliage.

== Etymology ==
The town was originally known as Vija, Vije, or Vice with local variants Vicealtı, Vicedibi, although it was officially named as Vicealtı until 1953 when its name was changed to Çamlıca by Turkish authorities. Its current name, Çamlıhemşin, was given in 1957, a combination of the terms "Çamlı", which in Turkish means "pine-forested" or "piney" and "Hemşin", which is the name of the indigenous Armenian population of the region.

The name Vija is the Laz word for brine, mineral (salty) water, which corresponds to the Kartvelian *weʒ₁- form.

== Geography ==
Çamlıhemşin is high in the Fırtına Valley, which leads down to the Black Sea coast, and is an important access point to the Kaçkar mountains. This is a hilly area surrounded by very high mountains that poke up into the clouds, and watered by the Hala River and other streams running down the Black Sea. It rains here all year round, temperatures drop to -7 °C in winter and reach 25 °C in summer.

This is a low-income district and successive generations of Çamlıhemşin have migrated to jobs in Turkey's larger cities (for example, they have reputation as the best bakers and pastry-cooks in Ankara). In Çamlıhemşin, some tea is grown and otherwise people live from forestry, beekeeping or herding animals on the mountainside. However the countryside here is a gorgeous mix of meadows and valleys and in recent years the district has begun to attract tourists, people on trekking holidays in the Kaçkar. There are now small hotels and guest houses throughout the district.

Çamlıhemşin itself is a small town of 2,355 people. There is a health centre and some blocks of public housing, residences for teachers and civil servants posted here. There are high schools in Çamlıhemşin and primary schools in the mountains villages. The traditional Çamlıhemşin village house is wooden, with a steep roof to run off the rain and a wooden terrace at the side. Many of these homes seem stuck to the steep hillsides by magic.

20 villages of the district are inhabited by Hemshinli, 7 villages are inhabited by Laz. The centre of the district (Vija/Vicealtı) has a Hemshinli majority and a Laz minority who are mostly recent settlers. Hemshinli have a distinct folk culture, for example, the women wear bright orange headscarves which they tie in a certain way to declare their availability (or not) for marriage.

The local cuisine includes muhlama, the fondue-type hot cheese, butter and flour pudding.

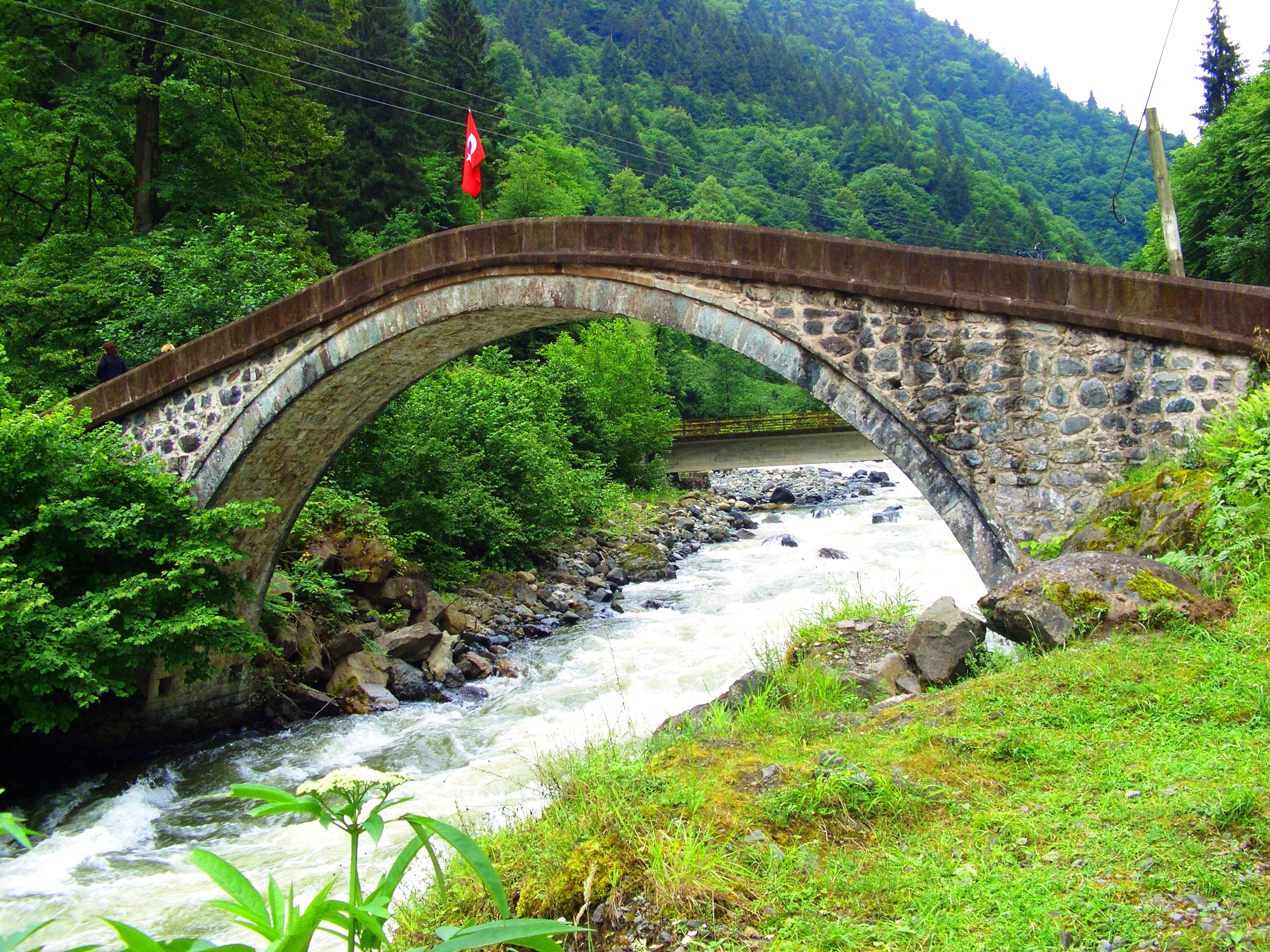
One of stone arch bridges over Hala Deresi which has been built in Ottoman Empire Era in the 19th century.

== Climate ==
Çamlıhemşin has an oceanic climate (Köppen: Cfb).

Climate data for Çamlıhemşin
Month	Jan	Feb	Mar	Apr	May	Jun	Jul	Aug	Sep	Oct	Nov	Dec	Year
Daily mean °C (°F)	3.8 (38.8)	4.4 (39.9)	6.6 (43.9)	10.8 (51.4)	14.7 (58.5)	18.4 (65.1)	21.2 (70.2)	21.3 (70.3)	18.6 (65.5)	14.1 (57.4)	10.0 (50.0)	5.9 (42.6)	12.5 (54.5)
Average precipitation mm (inches)	141 (5.6)	109 (4.3)	94 (3.7)	77 (3.0)	77 (3.0)	109 (4.3)	87 (3.4)	108 (4.3)	138 (5.4)	177 (7.0)	159 (6.3)	164 (6.5)	1,440 (56.8)
Source: Climate-Data.org

== Places of interest ==
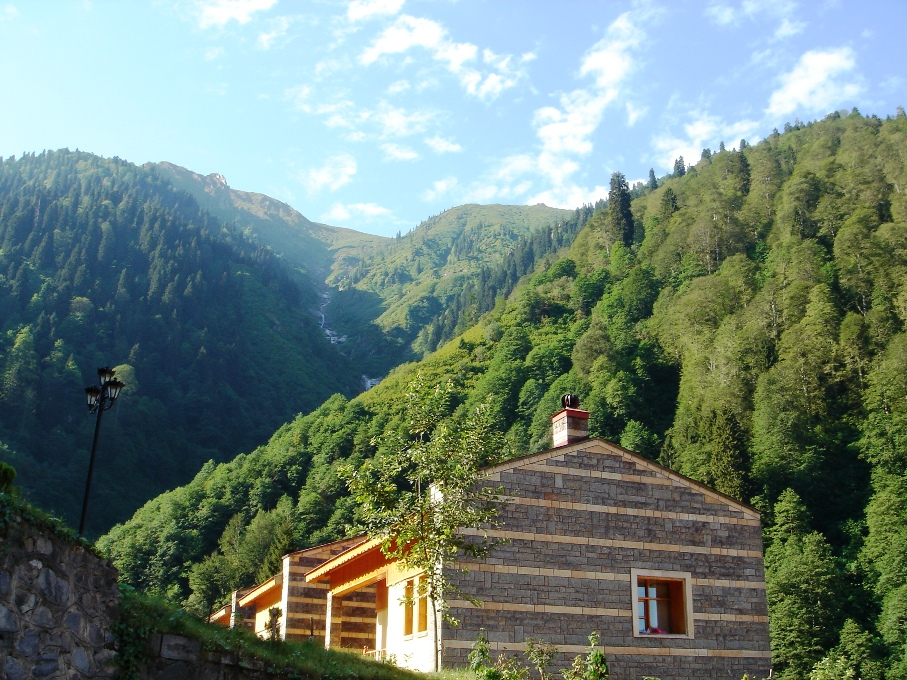

Çamlıhemşin has many places for hiking and escaping into the countryside, including:

- Ayder - the village has mineral baths and plenty of accommodation for visitors.
- the Fırtına Valley, which runs through the heart of Çamlıhemşin, and is spanned by the Ottoman-era Fırtına River bridges. These bridges are a regional speciality.
- Kale-i Balâ a castle high on a rock
- Zilkale, a medieval era castle

== Notable residents ==
- Mahmut Turan - a Turkish musician of Hemshin origin playing the tulum

== Gallery ==
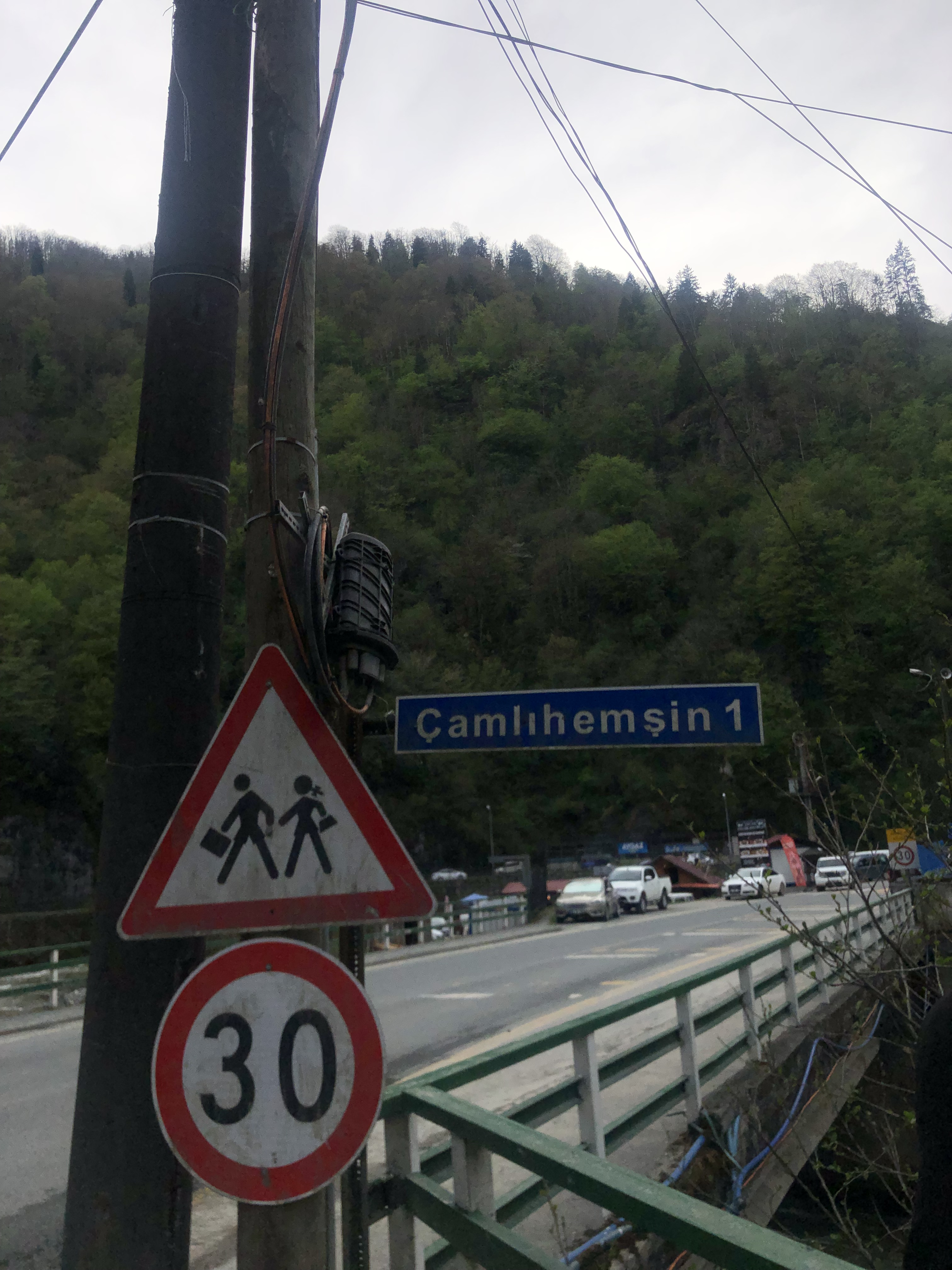

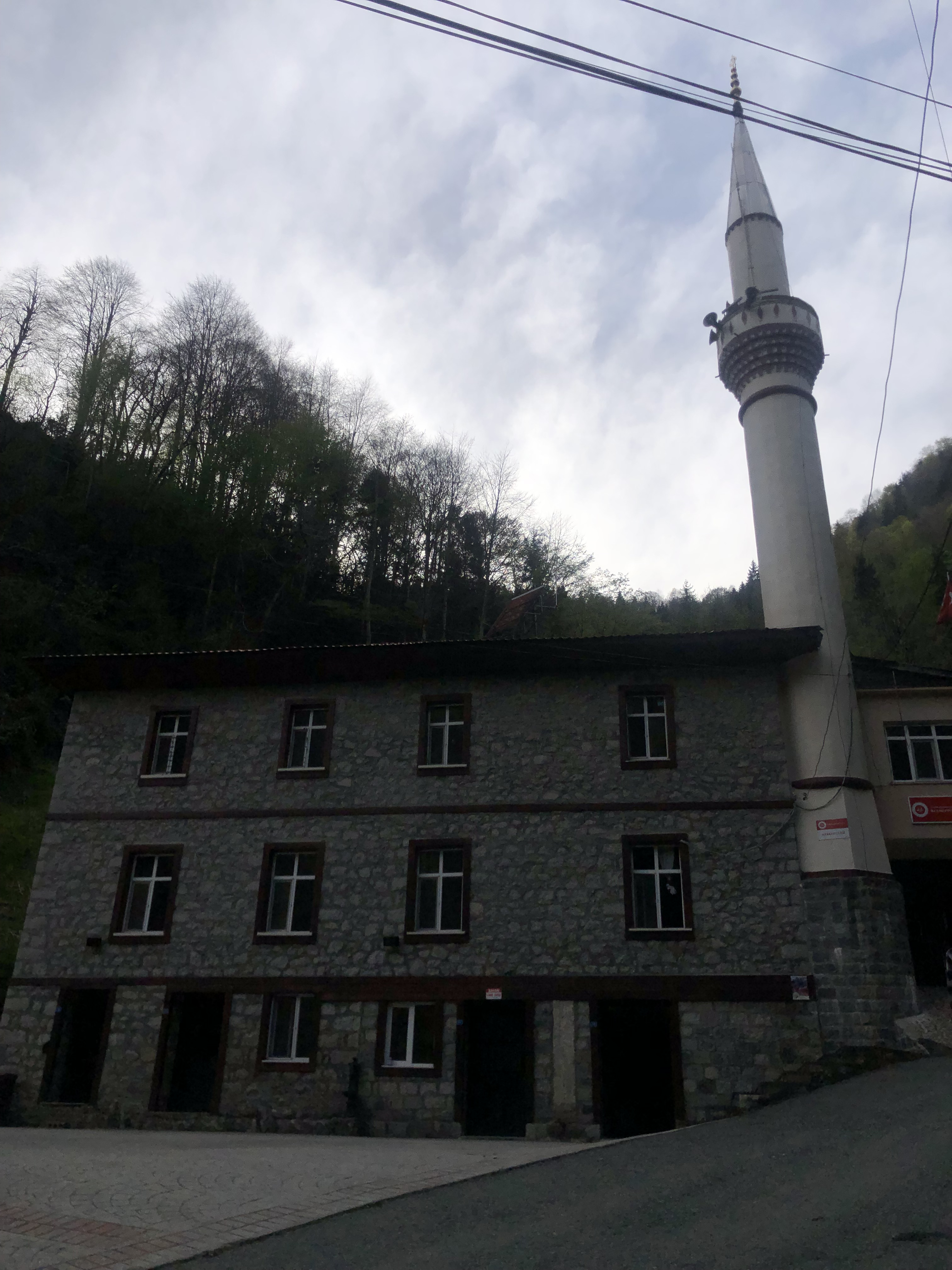
The central mosque at the village

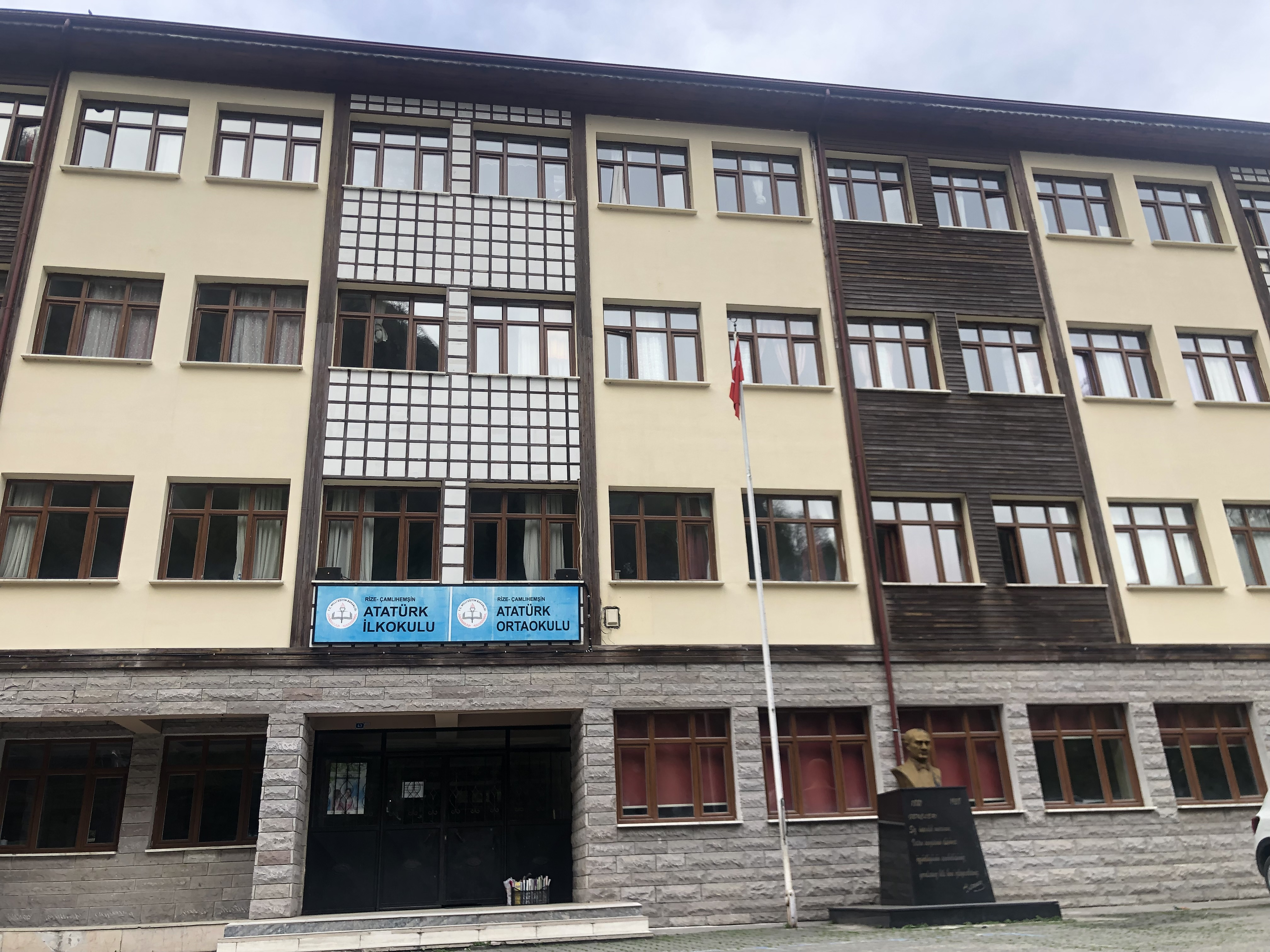

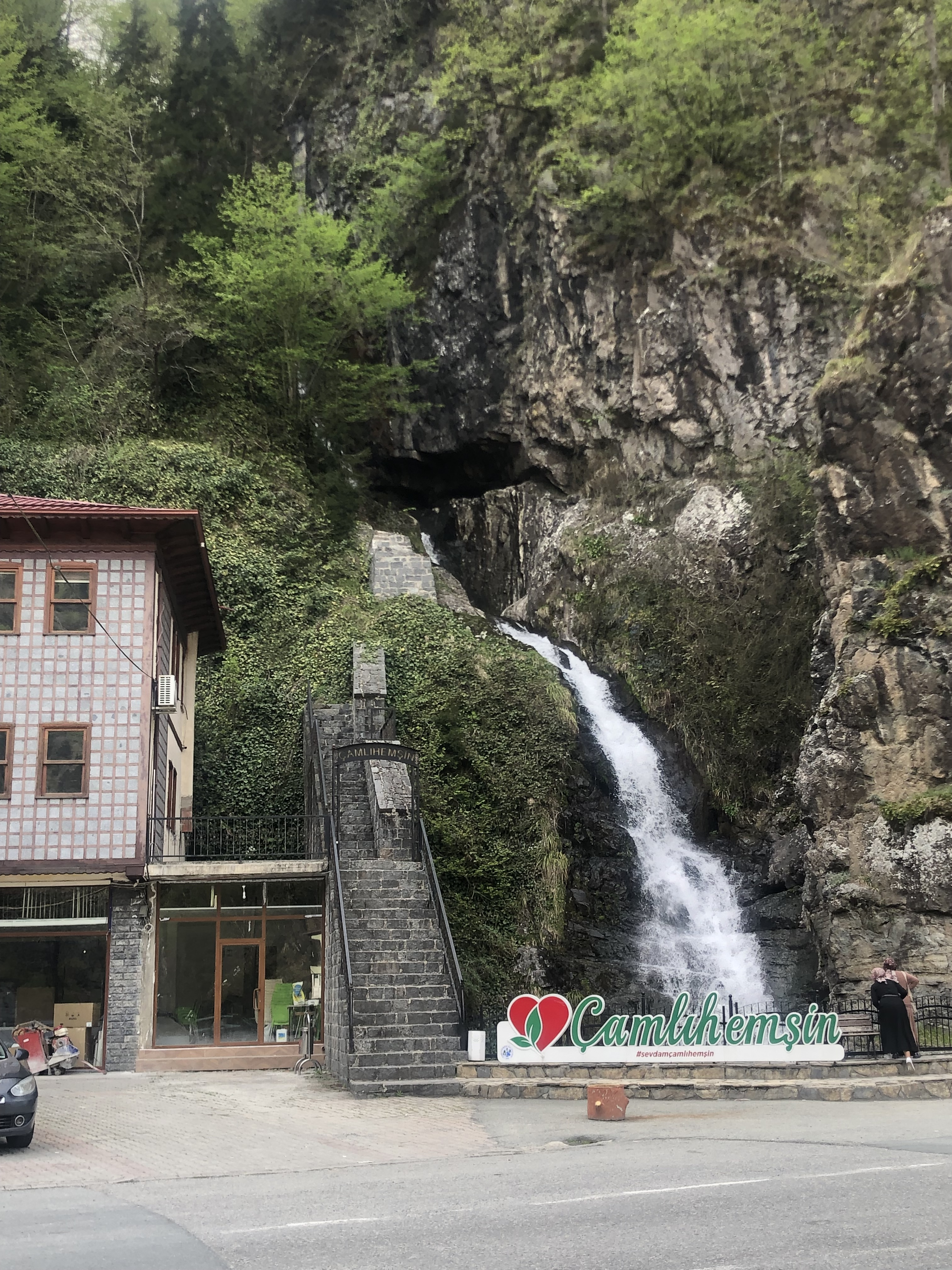

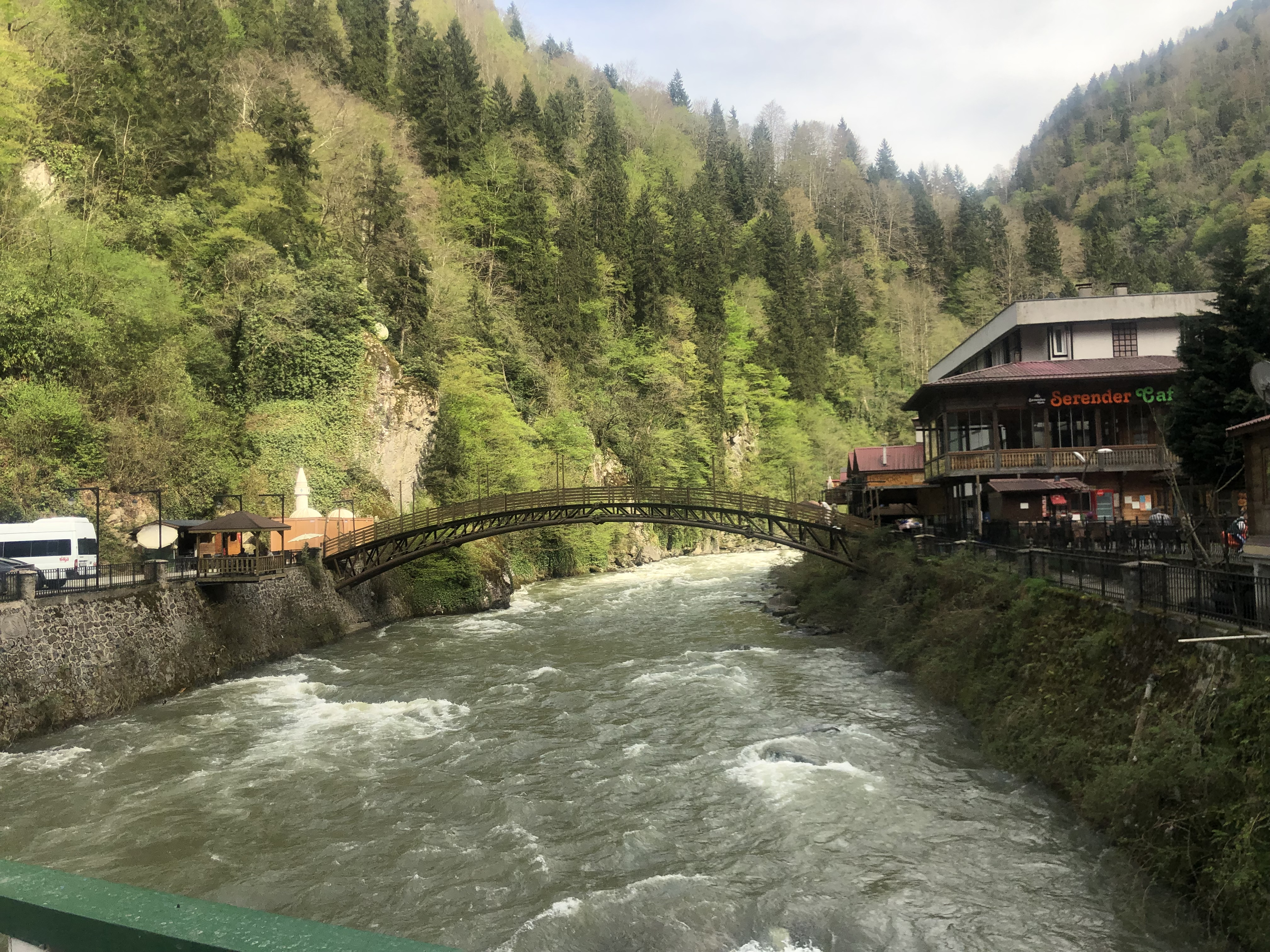

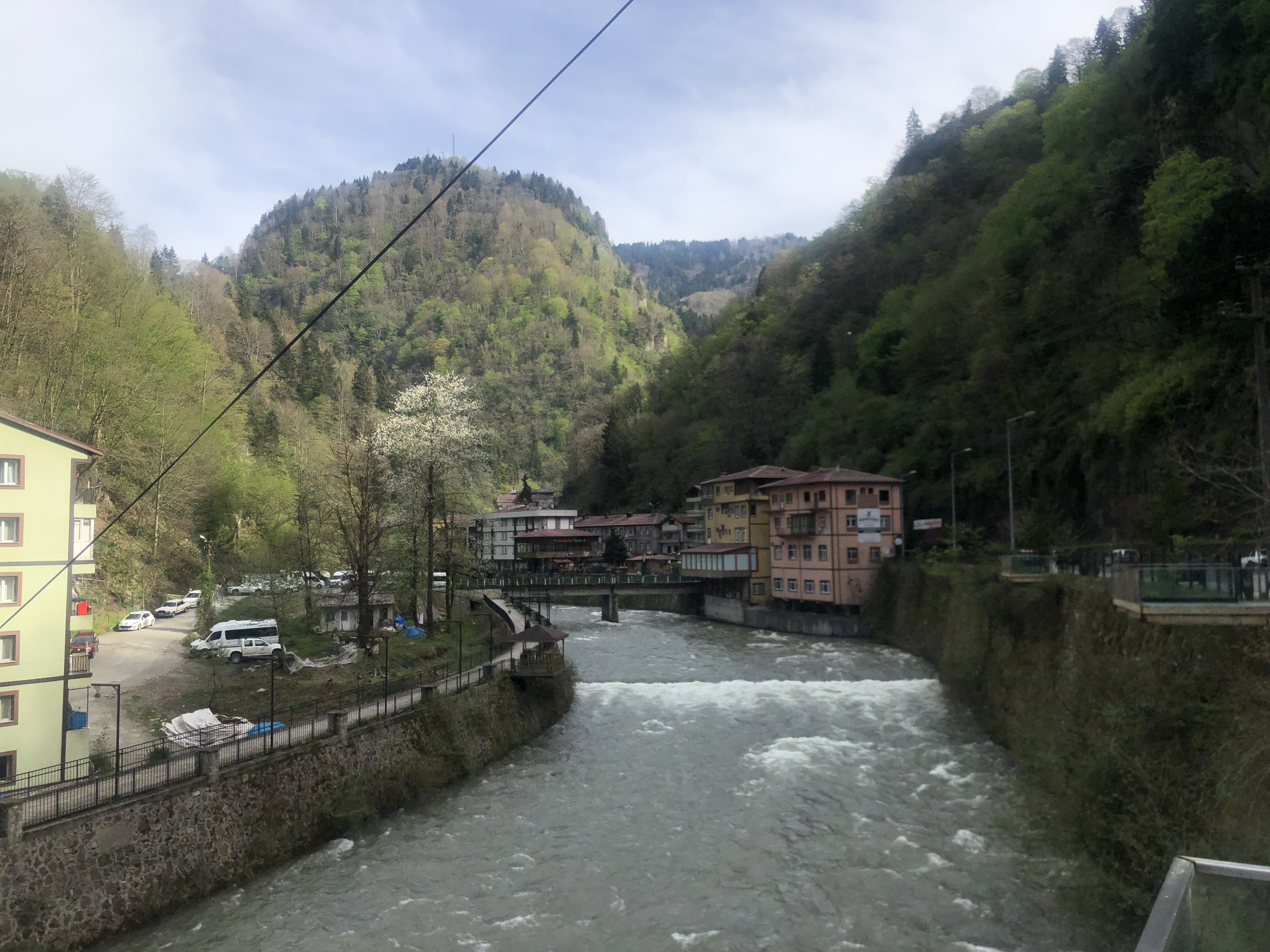
