= Black Sea region =

Coordinates: 41°00′N 36°00′E

Black Sea Region Karadeniz Bölgesi
- Region
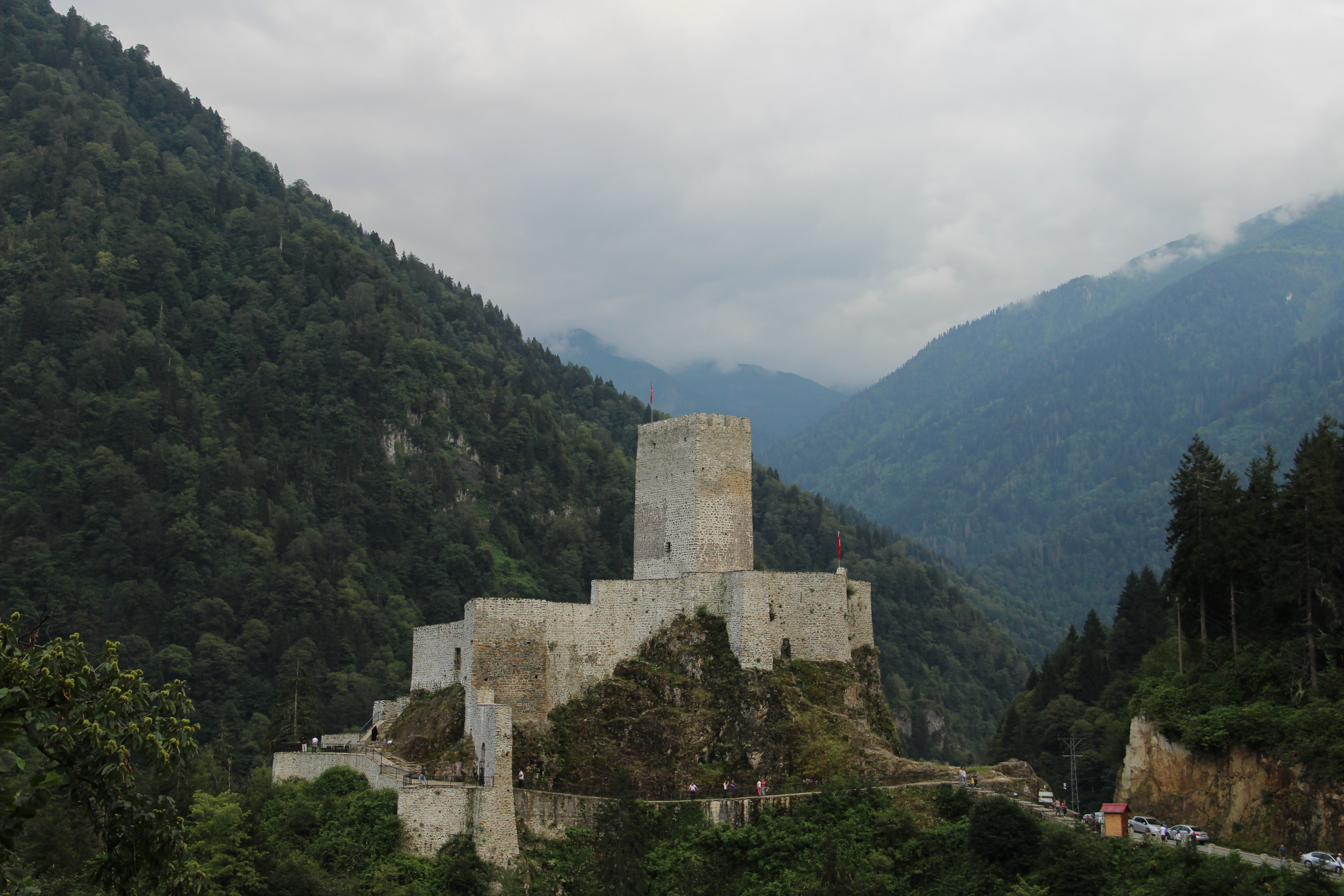

- Country: Turkey

Area
  - Total: 143,537 km^{2} (55,420 sq mi)

Population
  - Total: 7,696,132
  - Density: 53.6178/km^{2} (138.869/sq mi)

GDP
  - Total: US$ 50.024 billion (2022)
  - Per capita: US$ 6,500 (2022)

The Black Sea region (Turkish: Karadeniz Bölgesi) is a geographical region of Turkey. The largest city in the region is Samsun. Other big cities are Zonguldak, Trabzon, Ordu, Tokat, Giresun, Rize, Amasya and Sinop.

It is bordered by the Marmara region to the west, the Central Anatolia region to the south, the Eastern Anatolia region to the southeast, the Republic of Georgia to the northeast, and the Black Sea to the north.

== Subdivision ==
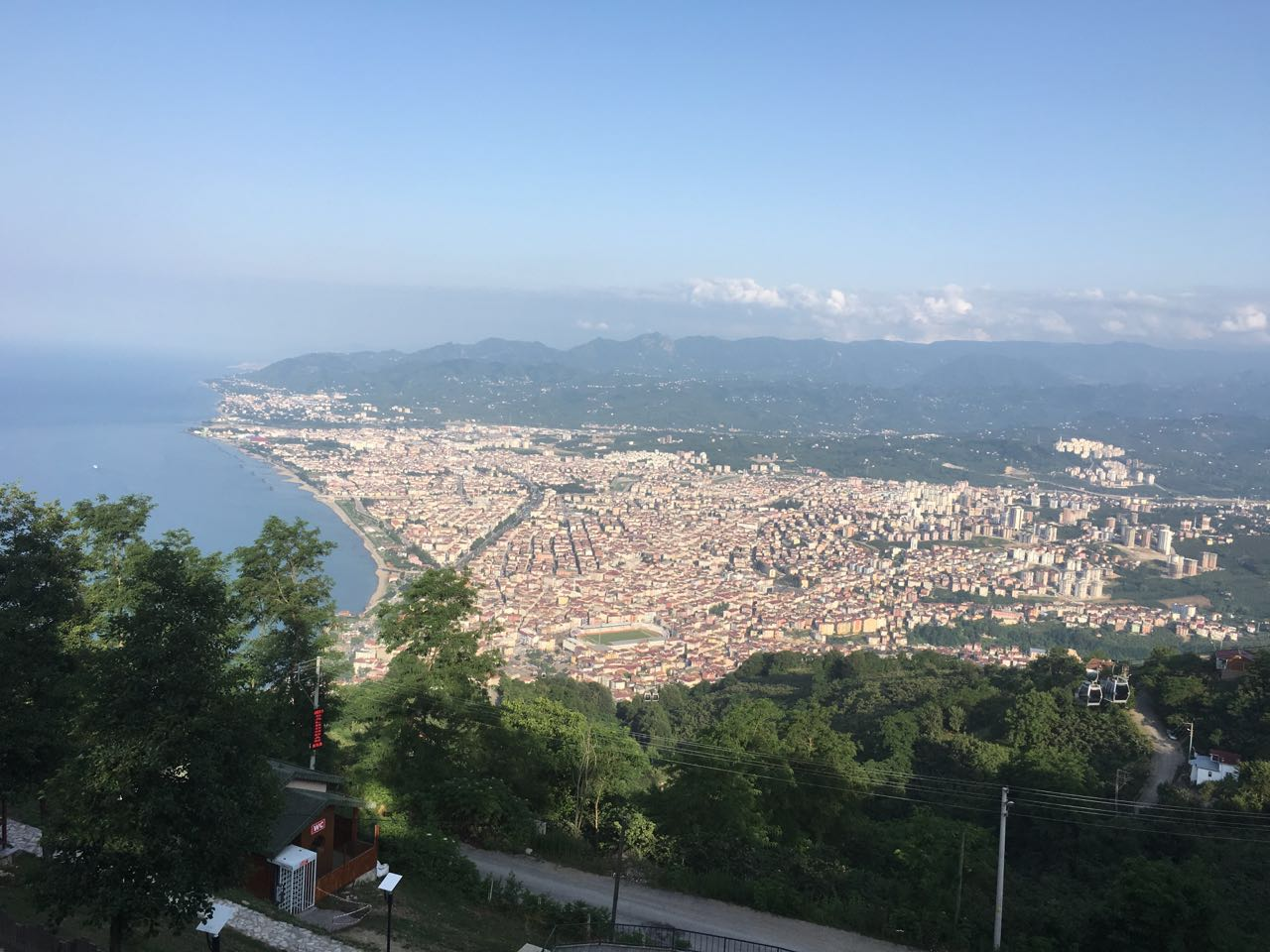
A view of Ordu on the Black Sea coast

- Western Black Sea Section (Turkish: Batı Karadeniz Bölümü)
  - Inner Western Black Sea Area (Turkish: Batı Karadeniz Ardı Yöresi)
  - Küre Mountains Area (Turkish: Küre Dağları Yöresi)
- Central Black Sea Section (Turkish: Orta Karadeniz Bölümü)
  - Canik Mountains Area (Turkish: Canik Dağları Yöresi)
  - Inner Central Black Sea Area (Turkish: Orta Karadeniz Ardı Yöresi)
- Eastern Black Sea Section (Turkish: Doğu Karadeniz Bölümü)
  - Eastern Black Sea Coast Area (Turkish: Doğu Karadeniz Ardı Yöresi)
  - Upper Kelkit - Çoruh Gully (Turkish: Yukarı Kelkit - Çoruh Oluğu)

== Ecoregions ==
=== Terrestrial ===
==== Palearctic ====
===== Temperate broadleaf and mixed forests =====
- Euxine-Colchic deciduous forests

===== Temperate coniferous forests =====
- Northern Anatolian conifer and deciduous forests

== Provinces ==
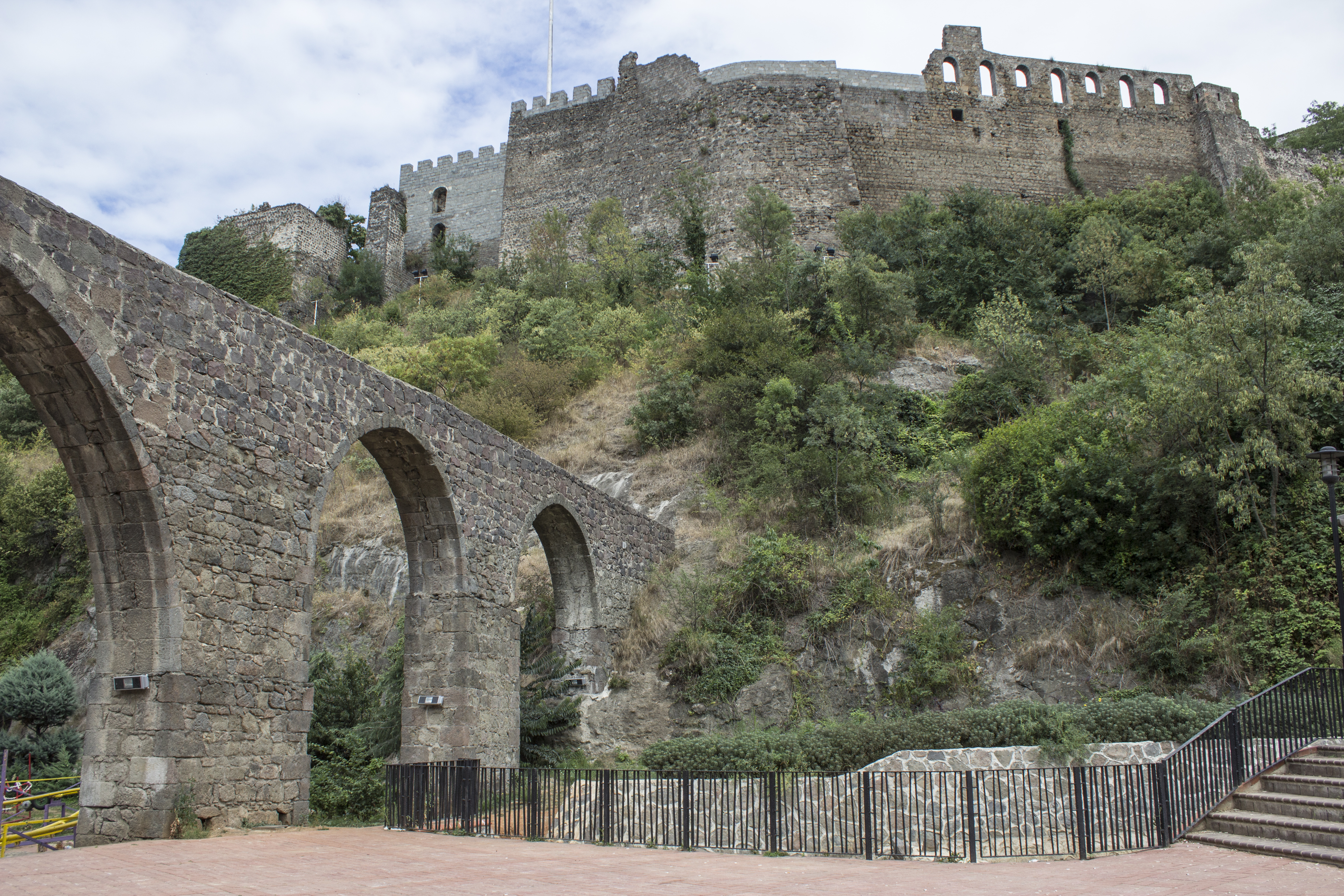
The City Walls of Trabzon and the Eugenius Aqueduct are among the oldest remaining structures in the city.

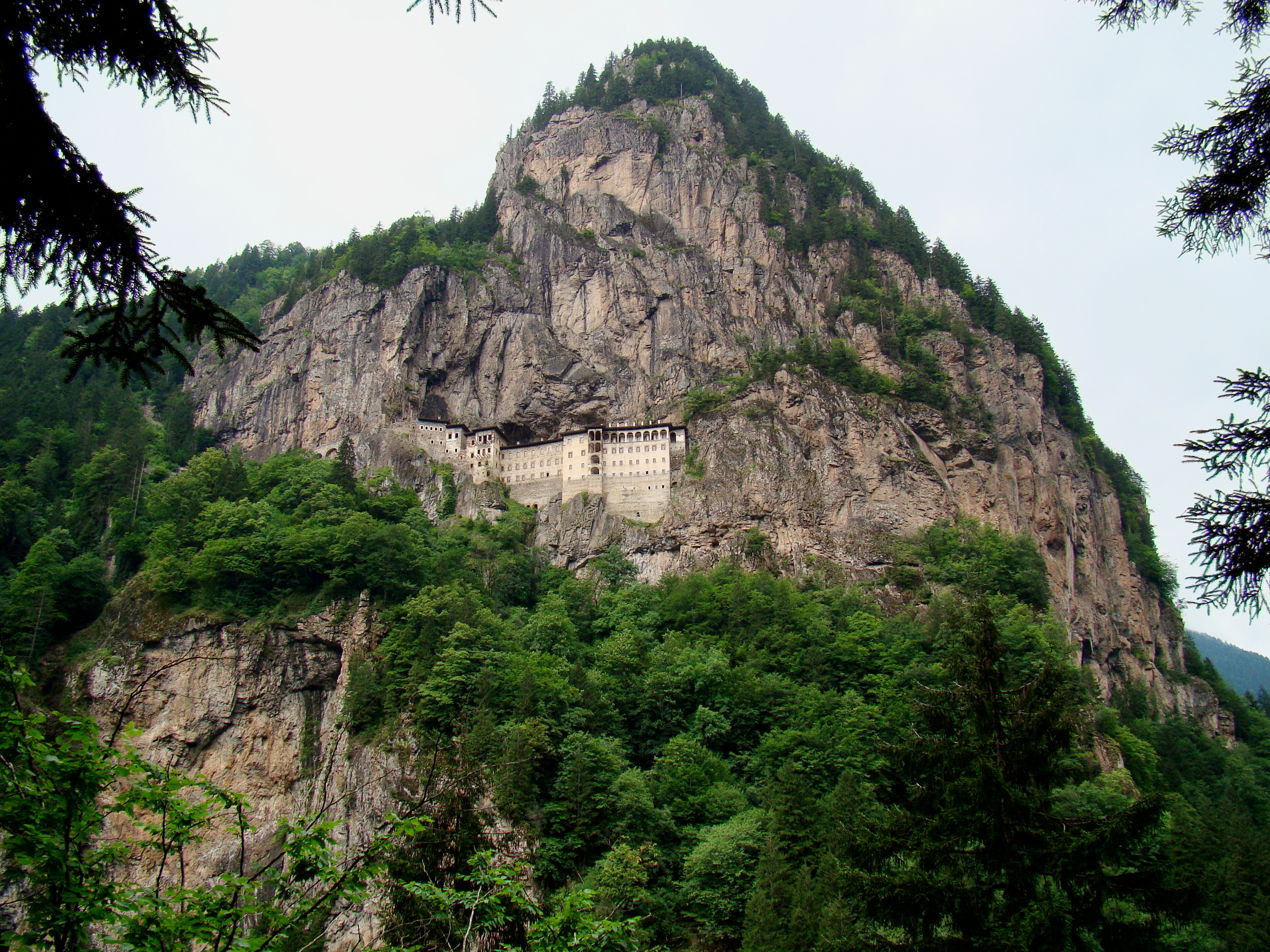
Sumela Monastery in the Pontic Mountains is located within the Maçka district of Trabzon Province.

Provinces that are entirely in the Black Sea Region:

- Amasya
- Gümüşhane
- Bartın
- Bolu
- Düzce
- Giresun
- Kastamonu
- Karabük
- Ordu
- Rize
- Samsun
- Sinop
- Tokat
- Trabzon
- Zonguldak

Provinces that are mostly in the Black Sea Region:

- Artvin
- Bayburt
- Çorum

Provinces that are partially in the Black Sea Region:

- Ankara
- Ardahan
- Çankırı
- Erzincan
- Erzurum
- Sivas
- Yozgat

== Population ==
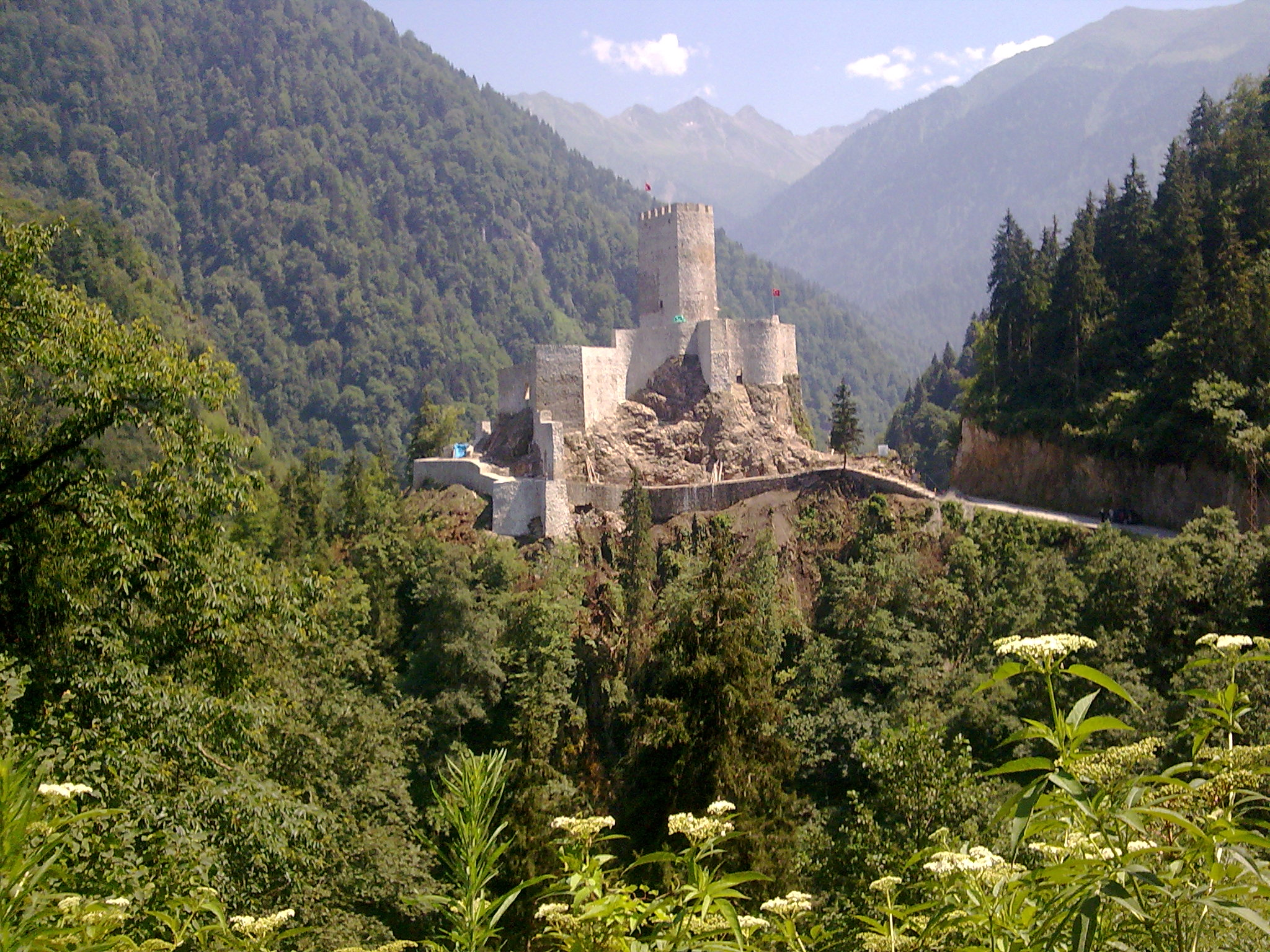
Zilkale Castle in the Çamlıhemşin district of Rize Province

The Black Sea region's population is 8,439,213 based on the 2010 census. 4,137,166 people live in cities and 4,301,747 people in villages. This makes it the only one of the seven regions of Turkey in which more people live in rural rather than urban areas.

Though the overwhelming majority is Turkish, the east of the region is also inhabited by the Laz, a people who speak a Kartvelian language which is closely related to Georgian and converted to Islam from Georgian Orthodoxy in the late Ottoman period as well as Muslim Georgians, also the Hemsin, Armenian converts to Islam, and Pontic Greeks, who converted to Islam in the 17th century. While a large community (around 25% of the population) of Christian Pontic Greeks remained throughout the Pontus area (including Trabzon and Kars in northeastern Turkey/the Russian Caucasus) until the 1920s, and in parts of Georgia and Armenia until the 2010s, preserving their own customs and dialect of Greek, the vast majority have since left, mainly to Greece. However, most Muslim Pontic Greeks remained in Turkey.

== Geography ==
The Black Sea region has a steep, rocky coast with rivers that cascade through the gorges of the coastal ranges. A few larger rivers, those cutting back through the Pontic Mountains (Doğu Karadeniz Dağları), have tributaries that flow in broad, elevated basins. Access inland from the coast is limited to a few narrow valleys because mountain ridges, with elevations of 1,525 to 1,800 meters in the west and 3,000 to 4,000 meters in the east in Kaçkar Mountains, form an almost unbroken wall separating the coast from the interior. The higher slopes facing northwest tend to be densely forested. Because of these natural conditions, the Black Sea coast historically has been isolated from Anatolia.

The mild, damp oceanic climate of the Black Sea coast makes commercial farming profitable. Running from Zonguldak in the west to Rize in the east, the narrow coastal strip widens at several places into fertile, intensely cultivated deltas. The Samsun area, close to the midpoint, is a major tobacco-growing region; east of it are numerous citrus groves. East of Samsun, the area around Giresun is known for the production of hazelnuts, and farther east the Rize region has numerous tea plantations. All cultivable areas, including mountain slopes wherever they are not too steep, are sown or used as pasture. The western part of the Black Sea region, especially the Zonguldak area, is a center of coal mining and heavy industry.

The North Anatolian Mountains in the north are an interrupted chain of folded highlands that generally parallel the Black Sea coast. In the west, the mountains tend to be low, with elevations rarely exceeding 1,500 meters, but they rise in an easterly direction to heights greater than 3,000 meters south of Rize. Lengthy, trough-like valleys and basins characterize the mountains. Rivers flow from the mountains toward the Black Sea. The southern slopes—facing the Anatolian Plateau—are mostly unwooded, but the northern slopes contain dense growths of both deciduous and evergreen trees.

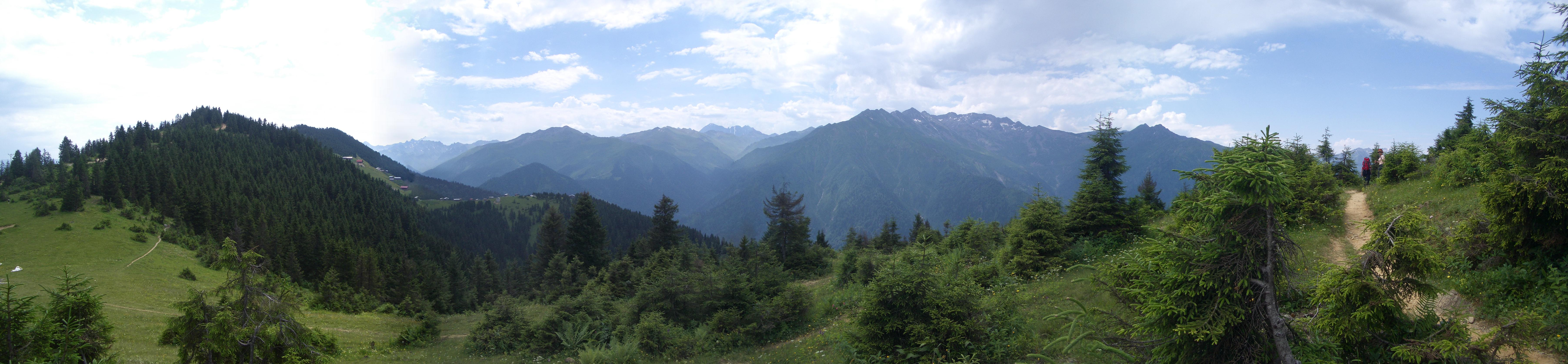
Panoramic view of the Pontic Mountains in the Black Sea Region of Turkey

== Climate ==
Zonguldak

Climate chart (precipitation, max. and min. temperature)
J	F	M	A	M	J	J	A	S	O	N	D
133 9 4	86 9 3	88 11 5	58 15 8	51 19 12	71 23 16	81 25 18	88 25 18	123 22 15	153 18 12	147 15 8	154 11 5
- █ Average max. and min. temperatures in °C
- █ Precipitation totals in mm
- Source: Turkish State Meteorology
Imperial conversion
J	F	M	A	M	J	J	A	S	O	N	D
5.2 49 38	3.4 48 37	3.5 51 40	2.3 59 47	2 65 53	2.8 73 60	3.2 77 65	3.5 77 65	4.8 72 60	6 65 54	5.8 58 47	6.1 52 42
- █ Average max. and min. temperatures in °F
- █ Precipitation totals in inches

Most of the Black Sea region has a borderline humid subtropical and oceanic (Köppen: Cfa/Cfb) climate; with high and evenly distributed rainfall the year round. At the coast, summers are warm and humid, and winters are cool and damp. The eastern part of the coast averages 2,500 millimeters annually which is the highest precipitation in the country. Snowfall is quite common between the months of December and March, snowing for a week or two, and it can be heavy once it snows.

The water temperature in the whole Turkish Black Sea coast is always cool and fluctuates between 8° and 20 °C throughout the year.

== Tourism ==
Those who dislike the heat and humidity of the summer in the Mediterranean and Aegean regions of Turkey go to the plateaux of the mountains in the Black Sea region which are almost permanently cloudy and receive heavy rainfall. The plateaux offer flora and fauna, forests, crater lakes, waterfalls, rivers, streams, mountain and nature walk, rafting, canoe and winter sports, hunting and fishing, grass skiing, thermal springs, and local dishes.

== See also ==
- Provinces of Turkey
- List of fish of the Black Sea
- Trabzon Province
- World Trade Center Trabzon
- Geography of Turkey
- Black Sea topics
- Bithynia
- Paphlagonia
- Pontus
- Lazistan
- Colchis
