= List of populated places in Iğdır Province =

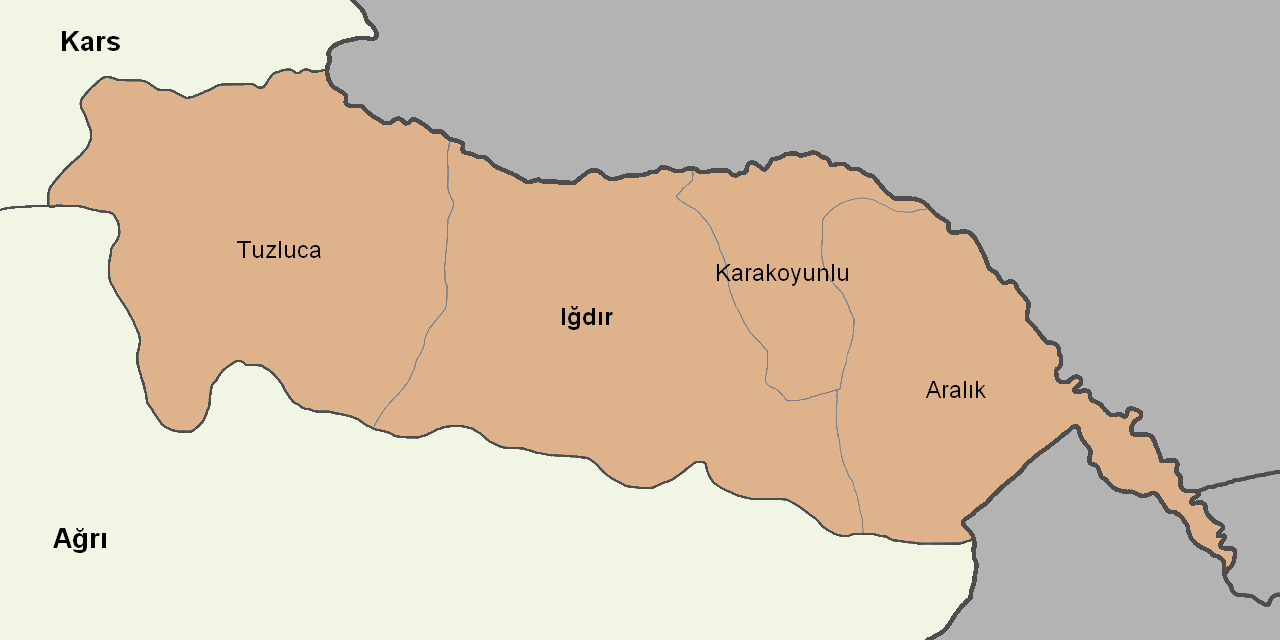
Iğdır Province

Below is the list of populated places in Iğdır Province, Turkey by district. In the following lists first place in each list is the administrative center of the district.

== Iğdır ==
Belde

- Halfeli
- Hoşhaber
- Melekli

Villages

- Ağaver
- Akyumak
- Alibeyköy
- Asma
- Aşağıçarıkçı
- Aşağıerhacı
- Bayraktutan
- Bendemurat
- Çakırtaş
- Çalpala
- Çilli
- Elmagöl
- Enginalan
- Evci
- Gülpınar
- Güngörmez
- Hakmehmet
- Harmandöven
- Kadıkışlak
- Karaçomak
- Karagüney
- Karakuyu
- Kasımcan
- Kazancı
- Kuzugüden
- Küllük
- Mezraa
- Necefali
- Nişankaya
- Obaköy
- Örüşmüş
- Özdemir
- Pınarbaşı
- Sarıçoban
- Suveren
- Tacirli
- Taşlıca
- Yaycı
- Yukarıçarıkçı
- Yüzbaşılar

== Aralık ==
Villages

- Adetli
- Aşağıaratan
- Aşağıçamurlu
- Aşağıçiftlik
- Aşağıtopraklı
- Babacan
- Emince
- Gödekli
- Hacıağa
- Hasanhan
- Karahacılı
- Kırçiçeği
- Kolikent
- Ramazankent
- Saraçlı
- Tazeköy
- Yenidoğan
- Yukarıaratan
- Yukarıçamurlu
- Yukarıçiftlik
- Yukarıtopraklı

== Karakoyunlu ==
Villages

- Aktaş
- Aşağıalican
- Bayatdoğanşalı
- Bekirhanlı
- Bulakbaşı
- Gökçeli
- Kacardoğanşalı
- Kerimbeyli
- Koçkıran
- Mürşitali
- Şıracı
- Taşburun
- Yazlık
- Yukarıalican
- Zülfikarköy

== Tuzluca ==
Villages

- Abbasgöl
- Ağabey
- Akdeğirmen
- Akdiz
- Akoluk
- Alhanlı
- Aliköse
- Arslanlı
- Aşağı Çıyrıklı
- Aşağıaktaş
- Aşağıcivanlı
- Aşağıkatırlı
- Aşağısutaşı
- Badilli
- Bağlan
- Bahçecik
- Bahçelimeydan
- Beyoğlu
- Bostanlı
- Buruksu
- Canderviş
- Çıraklı
- Çiçekli
- Doğanyurt
- Eğrekdere
- Elmalık
- Gaziler
- Gedikli
- Göktaş
- Güllüce
- Güzeldere
- Hadımlı
- Hamurkesen
- Hasankent
- İnce
- İncesu
- Kalaça
- Kamışlı
- Kandilli
- Karabulak
- Karacören
- Karakoyun
- Karanlık
- Karataş
- Kayakışlak
- Kayaören
- Kazkoparan
- Kelekli
- Kılıçlı
- Kırkbulak
- Kıznefer
- Köprübaşı
- Kula
- Kumbulak
- Kuruağaç
- Küçükova
- Laleli
- Mollakamer
- Nahırkıran
- Ombulak
- Ortabucak
- Osmanköy
- Özlü
- Pirdemir
- Sarıabdal
- Sarıbulak
- Soğukbulak
- Söğütlü
- Sürmeli
- Taşuçan
- Turabi
- Tutak
- Uğruca
- Üçkaya
- Ünlendi
- Yağlı
- Yassıbulak
- Yaylacık
- Yukarıaktaş
- Yukarıcivanlı
- Yüceotak
