= List of municipalities in Iğdır Province =

This is the List of municipalities in Iğdır Province, Turkey as of March 2023.

District	Municipality
Aralık	Aralık
Iğdır	Halfeli
Iğdır	Hoşhaber
Iğdır	Iğdır
Iğdır	Melekli
Karakoyunlu	Karakoyunlu
Tuzluca	Tuzluca
