= Surmalu uezd =

Coordinates: 39°55′15″N 44°02′40″E

Surmalu uezd Сурмалинскій уѣздъ
- Uezd
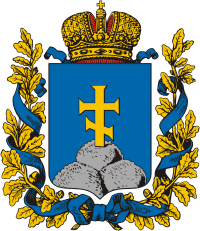
- Coat of arms

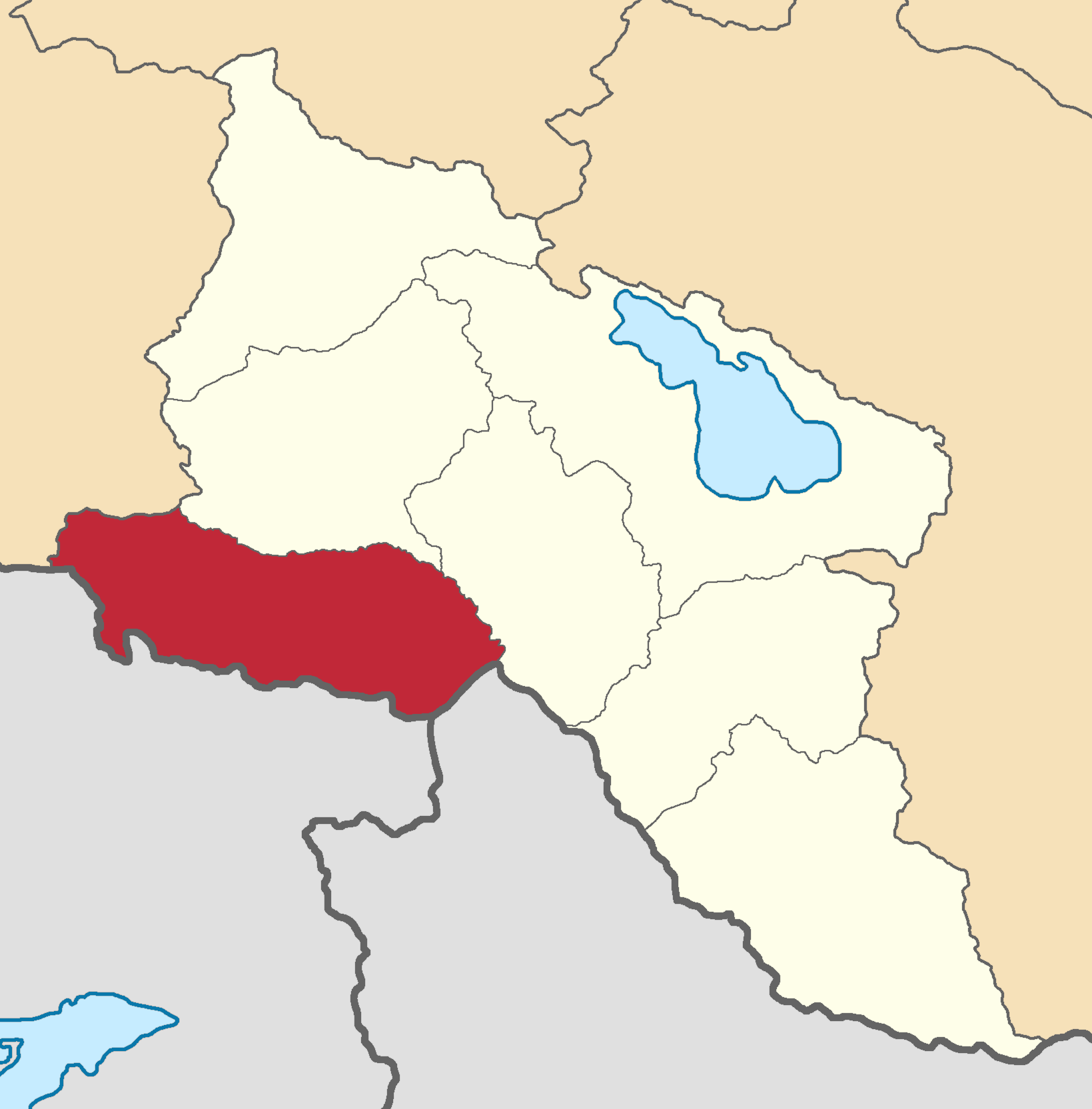
- Location in the Erivan Governorate
- Country: Russian Empire
- Viceroyalty: Caucasus
- Governorate: Erivan
- Established: 1828
- Abolished: 1918
- Capital: Igdyr (present-day Iğdır)

Area
  - Total: 3,581.58 km^{2} (1,382.86 sq mi)

Population (1916)
  - Total: 104,791
  - Density: 29.2583/km^{2} (75.7787/sq mi)
  - Rural: 100.00%

The Surmalu uezd (Note: Russian: Сурмалинский уезд, pre-reform orthography: Сурмалинскій уѣздъ, romanized: Surmalinskiy uyezd [sʊrməlʲɪnskʲɪj ʊ(j)ɪst]; Turkish: Sürmeli kazası [syɾmæli kazasɯ]; Azerbaijani: سورمه‌لی قضاسی, romanized: Sürmalī qaz̤āsı [syɾmæli ɡæzasɯ]; Armenian: Սուրմալուի գավառ, classical orthography: Սուրմալուի գաւառ, romanized: Surmalui gawaṙ [suɹmɑluˈ(j)i ɡɑˈvɑr]]) was a county (uezd) of the Erivan Governorate of the Caucasus Viceroyalty of the Russian Empire. It bordered the governorate's Etchmiadzin and Erivan uezds to the north, the Kars Oblast to the west, Persia to the east, and the Ottoman Empire to the south. The district made up most of the Iğdır Province of present-day Turkey. As part of the Russian Transcaucasus, the Surmalu uezd possessed economic importance for its abundantly rich salt mines in Kulp (Tuzluca), and spiritual importance to Armenians as the location of the culturally significant Mount Ararat. The administrative centre of the county was the town of Igdyr (present-day Iğdır).

== Etymology ==
The Turkic name Sürmalī (سورمه‌لی) and Persian name Surmalū (سرمه‌لو), whencefrom the Russian form Surmalu (Сурмалу) descended, are Turkified forms of the old Armenian city of Surmari's name, which itself evolved from Surb Mari (Armenian: Սուրբ Մարի, lit. 'Saint Mary'). The castle of Surmari still stands today in the village of Sürmeli near the Armenia–Turkey border within the Tuzluca district of Turkey's Iğdır Province.

== History ==
A part of Persia's Erivan Khanate, Surmalu was annexed by the Russian Empire in the Treaty of Turkmenchay in the aftermath of the Russo-Persian War of 1826–28. The district was first administered as part of the Armenian Oblast and then the Erivan Governorate. In 1829, Baltic German explorer Friedrich Parrot of the University of Dorpat (Tartu) traveled to Surmalu as part of his expedition to climb Mount Ararat. Accompanied by Armenian writer Khachatur Abovian and four others, Parrot made the first ascent of Ararat in recorded history from the Armenian monastery of St. Hakob in Akhuri (modern Yenidoğan).

Following the Russian Revolution, Surmalu came under the administration of the First Republic of Armenia in 1918. The district later fell under Turkish occupation during the Turkish invasion of Armenia in 1920 and was formally ceded to Turkey by the Treaty of Moscow in March 1921, following Armenia's Sovietization. The cession was confirmed in the Treaty of Kars, signed in October of that year. During the Kars negotiations, the Soviet side tried to secure "a concession on the salt-mining town of Koghb [Kulp], in Surmalu, for Soviet Armenia." However, Turkish diplomats rejected this proposal, "much to the disappointment of the Soviet side." Earlier, during the talks at Alexandropol, Alexander Khatisian tried to convince the Turkish Nationalists to leave the entire Surmalu region within Armenia, but unsuccessfully.

== Administrative divisions ==
The subcounties (uchastoks) of the Surmalu uezd in 1913 were as follows:

Name	1912 population	Area
1-y uchastok (1-й участок)	41,149	725.65 square versts (825.83 km^{2}; 318.86 mi^{2})
2-y uchastok (2-й участок)	28,093	1,214.24 square versts (1,381.88 km^{2}; 533.55 mi^{2})
3-y uchastok (3-й участок)	28,090	1,207.20 square versts (1,373.87 km^{2}; 530.45 mi^{2})

== Demographics ==
=== Russian Empire estimate (1886) ===
According to the Russian family lists accounts from 1886, of the total 71,066 inhabitants of the district, 34,351 were Tatars (Note: Before 1918, Azerbaijanis were generally known as "Tatars". This term, employed by the Russians, referred to Turkic-speaking Muslims of the South Caucasus. After 1918, with the establishment of the Azerbaijan Democratic Republic and "especially during the Soviet era", the Tatar group identified itself as "Azerbaijani".) (48.3%), 22,096 Armenians (31.1%), and 14,619 Kurds (20.6%).

=== Russian Empire Census ===
According to the Russian Empire Census, the Surmalu uezd had a population of 89,055 on 28 January [O.S. 15 January] 1897, including 47,269 men and 41,786 women. The plurality of the population indicated Tatar to be their mother tongue, with significant Armenian and Kurdish speaking minorities.

Linguistic composition of the Surmalu uezd in 1897
Language	Native speakers	%
Tatar	41,417	46.51
Armenian	27,075	30.40
Kurdish	19,099	21.45
Russian	725	0.81
Ukrainian	620	0.70
Polish	31	0.03
Belarusian	16	0.02
German	13	0.01
Georgian	11	0.01
Persian	9	0.01
Jewish	6	0.01
Greek	3	0.00
Lithuanian	1	0.00
Assyrian	1	0.00
Other	28	0.03
TOTAL	89,055	100.00

=== Kavkazskiy kalendar ===
==== 1910 ====
According to the 1910 publication of Kavkazskiy kalendar, the Surmalu uezd had a population of 91,535 on 14 January [O.S. 1 January] 1909, of which 41,990 were Shia Muslims (45.87%), 29,734 Armenians (32.48%), and 19,811 Kurds (21.64%).

==== 1917 ====
According to the 1917 publication of Kavkazskiy kalendar, the Surmalu uezd had a population of 104,791 on 14 January [O.S. 1 January] 1916, including 55,364 men and 49,427 women, 98,212 of whom were the permanent population, and 6,579 were temporary residents. The statistics indicated Shia Muslims to be the plurality of the population of the uezd, followed closely by Armenians, Kurds and Yazidis:

Nationality	Number	%
Shia Muslims (Note: Primarily Tatars.)	44,153	42.13
Armenians	32,686	31.19
Kurds	14,679	14.01
Yazidis	10,869	10.37
Sunni Muslims (Note: Primarily Turco-Tatars.)	1,801	1.72
Russians	429	0.41
Jews	95	0.09
Other Europeans	60	0.06
Asiatic Christians	19	0.02
TOTAL	104,791	100.00

== Settlements ==
According to the 1897 census, there were 51 settlements in the Surmalu uezd with a population over 500 inhabitants. The religious composition of the settlements was as follows:

Name		Faith				TOTAL		
Russian	Romanized	Armenian Apostolic	Muslim	Eastern Orthodox	Yazidi	Male	Female	Both
Аббас-Гел	Abbas-Gel (Abbasgöl)	483				274	253	527
Акарак	Akarak (Üçkaya)		924			454	470	924
Алетлу	Aletlu (Yüzbaşılar)	717				365	352	717
Алиджан	Alijan (Yukarıalican)	835				421	414	835
Аликамарлу	Alikamarlu (Ali Kamerli, Iğdır)	1,559				826	760	1,586
Аликизил	Alikizil (Aşağıtopraklı)	523				301	244	545
Арабкирлу	Arabkirlu (Bayraktutan)		623			321	302	623
Аралых-Башкенд	Aralykh-Bashkend (Aralık)		1,948			1,003	947	1,950
Аралых-Сурб-Оган (Орта-кенд)	Aralykh-Surb-Ogan (Orta-kend) (Ortaköy, Aralık)		979			510	469	979
Аратан	Aratan (Yukarıaratan)		487			254	243	497
Аргаджи	Argaji (Aşağıerhacı)		1,118			627	512	1,139
Ахвеис	Akhveis	1,065				521	544	1,065
Ахшамед	Akhshamed		718			375	343	718
Багарлу	Bagarlu	1,199				620	596	1,216
Гасан-Хан	Gasan-Khan		509			255	254	509
Гедаклу	Gedaklu		540			276	264	540
Гекджалу	Gekjalu		538			299	244	543
Гюллуджа (Гюлаб)	Gyulluja	1,100				564	536	1,100
Дашбурун	Dashburun (Taşburun)	2,103				1,100	1,026	2,126
Джаннар-абат	Jannar-abat		903			466	437	903
Джувтлуг (Байрам-Али-Кенд)	Juvutlug (Bayram-Ali-Kend)		598			313	285	598
Зильфугар	Zilfugar		635			356	279	635
Зор	Zor		749			394	363	757
Игдыр	Igdyr (Iğdır)	3,932		565		2,689	1,991	4,680
Игдыр-мова	Igdyr-mova	782	834			843	782	1,625
Казанчи	Kazanchi		557			284	273	557
Казикишляг	Kazikishlyag	326	380			359	347	706
Камышлу	Kamyshlu		529			267	262	529
Каракоюнлу II	Karakoyunlu II		1,857			1,013	858	1,871
Каракуй	Karakuy				533	291	251	542
Кизил-Закир (Закирлу)	Kizil-Zakir (Zakirlu)	194	325			307	217	524
Кульп	Kulp (Tuzluca)	3,287				1,876	1,703	3,579
Кюллюк	Kyullyuk		1,030			523	507	1,030
Малаклу	Malaklu (Melekli)		2,126			1,129	1,011	2,140
Молла-Камар	Molla-Kamar	577				303	274	577
Муршуд-Али	Murshud-Ali	535				288	289	577
Наджаф-Али	Najaf-Ali	497	79			291	285	576
Оба (Аликамар-Ислам)	Oba (Alikamar-Islam)		603			308	295	603
Паник	Panik	1,143				593	550	1,143
Парнаут	Parnaut		682	125		477	330	807
Плюр	Plyur	1,850				947	903	1,850
Сараглу (Гаджи-Ага)	Saraglu (Gaji-Aga)		573			311	262	573
Сулейман-абат (Диза)	Suleyman-abat (Diza)		1,828			950	878	1,828
Сурмалу	Surmalu (Sürmeli)		512			282	230	512
Тейджерлу	Teyjerlu	973				499	474	973
Тоханшалу-Баят	Tokhanshalu-Bayat		512			289	223	512
Тоханшалу-Коджар	Tokhanshalu-Kojar		1,063			554	509	1,063
Халфалу	Khalfalu	986				556	494	1,050
Хош-Хараб	Khosh-Kharab	693				367	328	695
Эвджиляр	Evjilyar	1,531				764	770	1,534
Яйджи	Yayji		1,289			664	625	1,289
TOTAL		26,890	26,048	690	530	28,919	26,058	54,977

== Bibliography ==
- Кавказский календарь на 1910 год [Caucasian calendar for 1910] (in Russian) (65th ed.). Tiflis: Tipografiya kantselyarii Ye.I.V. na Kavkaze, kazenny dom. 1910. Archived from the original on 15 March 2022.
- Кавказский календарь на 1913 год [Caucasian calendar for 1913] (in Russian) (68th ed.). Tiflis: Tipografiya kantselyarii Ye.I.V. na Kavkaze, kazenny dom. 1913. Archived from the original on 19 April 2022.
- Кавказский календарь на 1917 год [Caucasian calendar for 1917] (in Russian) (72nd ed.). Tiflis: Tipografiya kantselyarii Ye.I.V. na Kavkaze, kazenny dom. 1917. Archived from the original on 4 November 2021.
- Bournoutian, George A. (2018). Armenia and Imperial Decline: The Yerevan Province, 1900–1914. Milton Park, Abingdon, Oxon: Routledge. ISBN 978-1-351-06260-2. OCLC 1037283914.
- Danielyan, E. L. (2010). "Հայոց պատմական և քաղաքակրթական արժեհամակարգի պաշտպանության անհրաժեշտությունը [On the Necessity of Protecting Armenian Historical and Civilizational System of Values]". Lraber Hasarakakan Gitutyunneri (in Armenian) (3). ISSN 0320-8117.
- De Clavijo, Ruy González (2004). Embassy to Tamerlane, 1403-1406. London: RoutledgeCurzon. ISBN 9780415344890.
- Hovannisian, Richard G. (1971). The Republic of Armenia. Vol. 1: The First Year, 1918–1919. Berkeley: University of California Press. ISBN 978-0520019843.
- Hovannisian, Richard G. (1996b). The Republic of Armenia. Vol. 4: Between Crescent and Sickle: Partition and Sovietization. Berkeley: University of California Press. ISBN 978-0520088047.
- Parrot, Friedrich (2016) [1846]. Journey to Ararat. Translated by William Desborough Cooley. Introduction by Pietro A. Shakarian. London: Gomidas Institute. ISBN 9781909382244.
- Shakarian, Pietro A. (2025). Anastas Mikoyan: An Armenian Reformer in Khrushchev's Kremlin. Bloomington: Indiana University Press. ISBN 978-0253073556.
- Tsutsiev, Arthur (2014). Atlas of the Ethno-Political History of the Caucasus (PDF). Translated by Nora Seligman Favorov. New Haven: Yale University Press. ISBN 9780300153088. Archived (PDF) from the original on 17 June 2023.
