= Iğdır Airport =

Iğdır Şehit Bülent Aydın Airport Iğdır Şehit Bülent Aydın Havalimanı
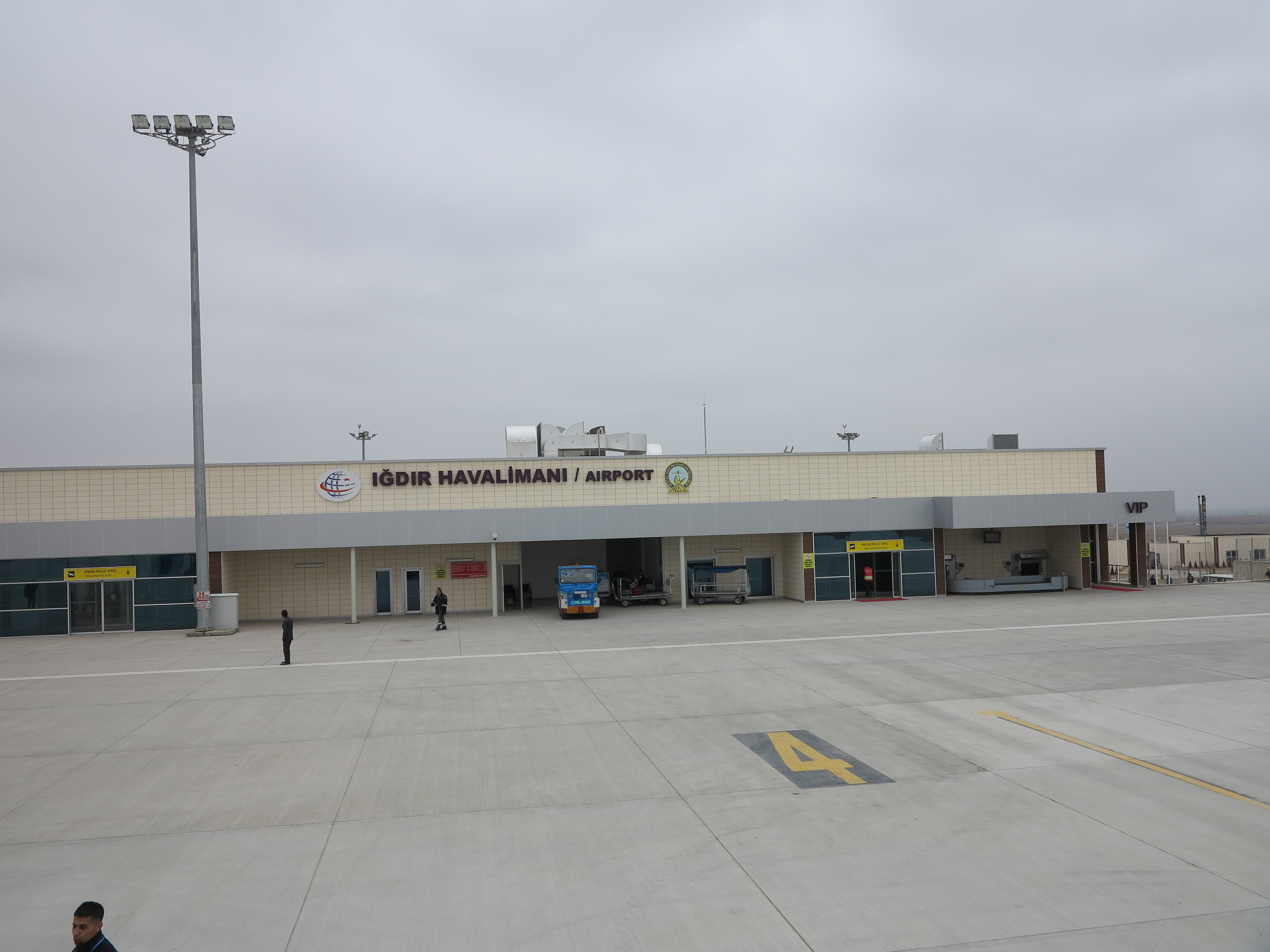
- IATA: IGD; ICAO: LTCT

Summary
- Airport type: Public
- Operator: Turkish Airports Authority
- Serves: Iğdır Province, Turkey
- Location: Küllük, Iğdır, Turkey
- Opened: 13 July 2012; 14 years ago
- Elevation AMSL: 3,100 ft (940 m)
- Coordinates: 39°58′36″N 43°52′36″E
- Website: Iğdır Şehit Bülent Aydın Airport

Map
- Location of the airport IGD/LTCT (Caucasus Mountains) IGD/LTCT (Europe)

Runways
Direction	Length		Surface
Direction	m	ft	Surface
12/30	3,000	9,842	Concrete

Statistics (2025)
- Annual passenger capacity: 800,000
- Passengers: 385,438
- Passenger change 2024–25: ▲1%
- Aircraft movements: 4,152
- Movements change 2024–25: ▲1%
- Source: (Turkish AIP at Eurocontrol) Turkish Airports Authority

Iğdır Şehit Bülent Aydın Airport (IATA: IGD, ICAO: LTCT) (Turkish: Iğdır Şehit Bülent Aydın Havalimanı) —named Iğdır Airport until April 2017— is the primary and only airport serving Iğdır Province, Turkey.

The airport is owned and operated by the Turkish Airports Authority (DHMİ).

The airport was opened to air traffic on 13 July 2012. It lies 16 kilometres (9.9 mi) west of Iğdır, the central district of the Iğdır Province.

As a member of the Airports Council International Europe (ACI Europe), the airport participates in the Airport Carbon Accreditation Programme.

== History ==
Construction of the airport, situated near the village of Küllük, began in 1996 but was brought to a complete halt in 2001. Construction resumed on 12 June 2010 following the laying of a new foundation, and the airport was opened on 13 July 2012 by the then Prime Minister, Recep Tayyip Erdoğan.

In April 2017, the name of Iğdır Airport was changed to ‘Iğdır Şehit Bülent Aydın Airport’ in memory of Bülent Aydın, an artillery non-commissioned officer from Iğdır who was killed by the coup plotters during the 2016 coup attempt.

As of 7 August 2025, the airport’s status was confirmed as an international airport permanently.

In March 2026, Iğdır Şehit Bülent Aydın Airport served as alternate airport of Nakhchivan International Airport in neighbouring Azerbaijan's Nakhchivan exclave, during temporary closure of the airport due to the Iranian strikes there. Flights between Baku and Nakhchivan have been re-scheduled and operated between Baku and Iğdır, shuttle bus service was provided to transport passengers from Iğdır Şehit Bülent Aydın Airport to Nakhchivan and vice versa.

== Facilities ==
Iğdır Şehit Bülent Aydın Airport features a runway measuring 3,000 metres (9,800 ft) by 45 metres (148 ft), a taxiway measuring 250 metres (820 ft) by 24 metres (79 ft), five aircraft parking bays, an apron measuring 240 metres (790 ft) by 120 metres (390 ft), and a perimeter road 7,582 metres (24,875 ft) in length. The airport’s terminal building, which has a covered area of 3,500 square metres (38,000 sq ft), comprises an arrivals hall, a departures hall, and a VIP lounge.

== Airlines and destinations ==
The following airlines operate regularly scheduled passenger flights to and from Iğdır Şehit Bülent Aydın Airport:

Airlines	Destinations
AJet	Ankara, Istanbul–Sabiha Gökçen
Pegasus Airlines	Istanbul–Sabiha Gökçen
Turkish Airlines	Istanbul

== Traffic statistics ==
Iğdır–Şehit Bülent Aydın Airport Passenger Statistics
Year (months)	Domestic	% change	International	% change	Total	% change
2025	385,438	▲1%	-	▼100%	385,438	▲1%
2024	382,541	▲9%	633	▼73%	383,174	▲8%
2023	352,121	▲69%	2,385	▼45%	354,506	▲66%
2022	208,827	▲9%	4,309	-	213,136	▲11%
2021	191,870	▲43%	-	▼100%	191,870	▲43%
2020	134,176	▼48%	296	▼73%	134,472	▼49%
2019	260,174	▼10%	1,081	-	261,255	▼10%
2018	289,251	▲17%	-	-	289,251	▲17%
2017	248,005	▲15%	-	-	248,005	▲15%
2016	216,252	▲2%	-	-	216,252	▲2%
2015	212,104	▲7%	-	-	212,104	▲7%
2014	198,270	▼9%	-	-	198,270	▼9%
2013	216,715	▲292%	-	-	216,715	▲292%
2012	55,225	Steady	-	Steady	55,225	Steady

^1: 2012 statistics correspond to the last 6 months of 2012 since the opening of the airport.

== Ground transport ==
=== Road ===
The airport is reachable by car, taxi, and rental car service from the D.080 Turkish highway which passes through the Iğdır Province. There is also a shuttle bus service operated between the city center and the airport.

== Trivia ==
The airport was depicted in a Turkish Airlines advertisement in 2014, where a group of kids trying to ask the Turkish Airlines aircraft to land at their town (and their own made airport), and little to their knowledge that a real airport was constructed.

The airport was depicted also in Turkish Airlines commercial series of "Delightful Stories" (2014), where András Földvári, then head of marketing in Turkish Airlines' Hungary Office, flew from Budapest to Iğdır to explore Noah's Ark.

== See also ==
- Transport in Turkey
- List of airports in Turkey
