= Panik =

Panik may refer to:

== Places ==
- Panik, Armenia
- Panik, Iğdır, Turkey
- Panik, Bileća, Bosnia and Herzegovina
- Panik, Vologda Oblast, Russia

== Other uses ==
- Panik, one quarter of the production group Molemen.
- Panik (band)
- Panik (film), a 1928 German film directed by and starring Harry Piel
- Joe Panik, American baseball player
- Richard Pánik, Slovak ice hockey player
- Panik, a meme portraying Meme Man panicking in red
