= Suveren Military Cemetery =

Cemetery in İzmir Province, Turkey

Details
- Established: 1945
- Location: Suveren village, Iğdır Province
- Country: Turkey
- No. of graves: 45

The Suveren Military Cemetery is a military cemetery in Suveren village, Iğdır, Iğdır Province, Turkey.

== History ==
Established in 1945, the cemetery holds the remains of 45 Turkish Military soldiers who died in the Turkish-Armenian front during the Turkish War of Independence and the Ararat Rebellion. The cemetery was restored in 2009.
