= Çakırtaş =

Çakırtaş can refer to the following places in Turkey:

- Çakırtaş, Kemaliye
- Çakırtaş, Iğdır
- Çakırtaş, Pasinler
- Çakırtaş, Vezirköprü
