= Kuzugüden, Iğdır =

Kuzugüden
- Village
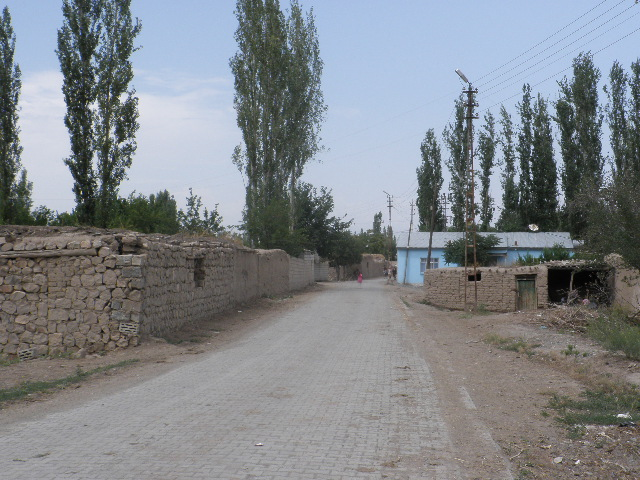

- Location within Turkey
- Coordinates: 39.9861°N 43.9732°E
- Country: Turkey
- Province: Iğdır
- District: Iğdır
- Elevation: 876 m (2,874 ft)
- Population (2022): 260
- Time zone: UTC+3 (TRT)

Kuzugüden is a village in the Iğdır District, Iğdır Province, in eastern Turkey. Its population is 260 (2022).

== Geography ==
The village lies to the east of Tuzluca, 16 kilometres (9.9 mi) by road west of the district capital of Iğdır.
