= Güngörmez =

Güngörmez can refer to:

- Güngörmez, Iğdır
- Güngörmez, Karacabey
- Güngörmez, Mecitözü
- Gun Gowrmez, East Azerbaijan province, Iran
