= Hakmehmet, Iğdır =

Hakmehmet
- Village
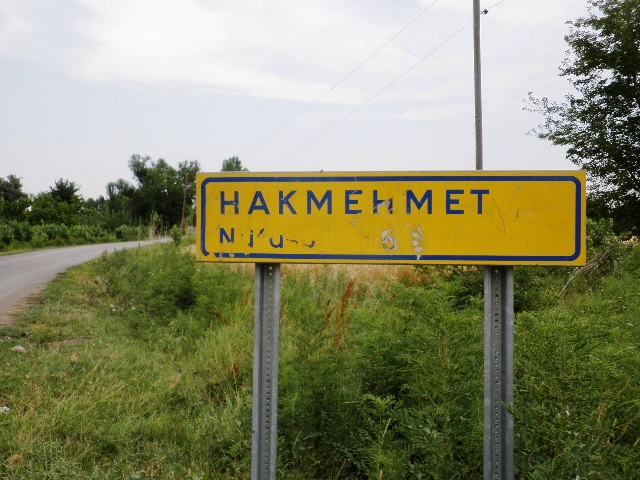

- Location within Turkey
- Coordinates: 39.9972°N 43.9813°E
- Country: Turkey
- Province: Iğdır
- District: Iğdır
- Elevation: 877 m (2,877 ft)
- Population (2022): 413
- Time zone: UTC+3 (TRT)

Hakmehmet is a village in the Iğdır District, Iğdır Province, in eastern Turkey. Its population is 413 (2022). The village is populated by Azerbaijanis.

== Geography ==
The village lies to the east of Tuzluca, 13 kilometres (8.1 mi) by road west of the district capital of Iğdır.
