= Yukarıçarıkçı, Iğdır =

Yukarıçarıkçı
- Village
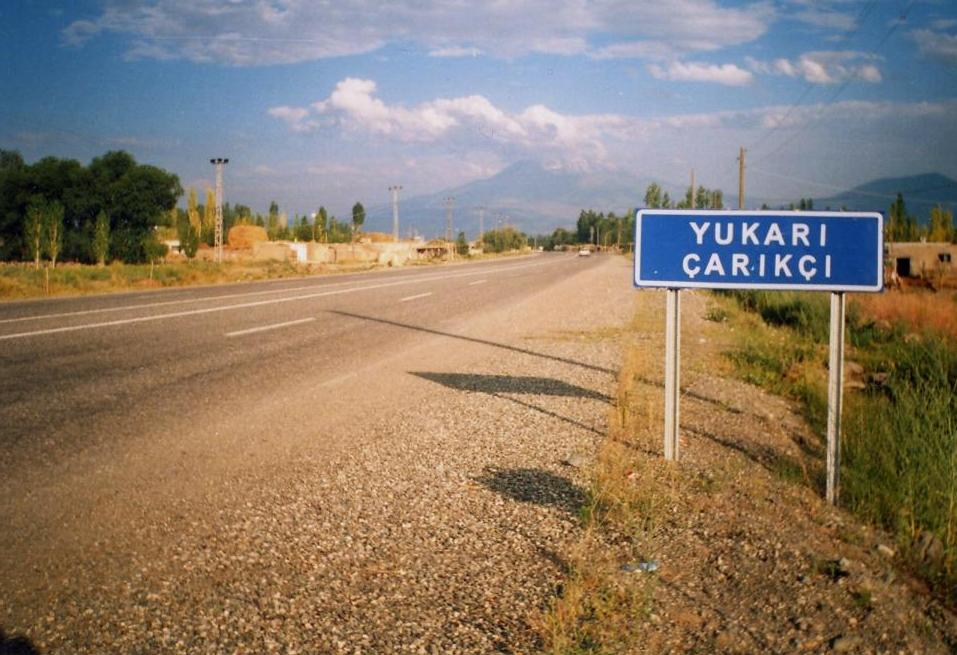

- Location within Turkey
- Coordinates: 39.9626°N 43.9376°E
- Country: Turkey
- Province: Iğdır
- District: Iğdır
- Elevation: 875 m (2,871 ft)
- Population (2022): 728
- Time zone: UTC+3 (TRT)

Yukarıçarıkçı is a village in the Iğdır District, Iğdır Province, in eastern Turkey. Its population is 728 (2022). The village is populated by Azerbaijanis.

== Geography ==
The village lies to the east of Tuzluca, 10 kilometres (6.2 mi) by road west of the district capital of Iğdır.
