= Yaycı, Iğdır =

Yaycı
- Village
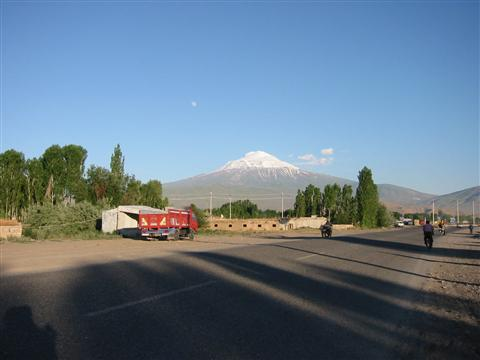

- Location within Turkey
- Coordinates: 39.948°N 43.969°E
- Country: Turkey
- Province: Iğdır
- District: Iğdır
- Elevation: 866 m (2,841 ft)
- Population (2022): 794
- Time zone: UTC+3 (TRT)

Yaycı is a köy (village) in the Iğdır District of Iğdır Province, Turkey. Its population is 794 (2022). The village is populated by Azerbaijanis.

== Geography ==
The village lies on a 5 kilometres (3.1 mi) distance by road of the district capital of Iğdır.
