= Bayraktutan, Iğdır =

Bayraktutan
- Village
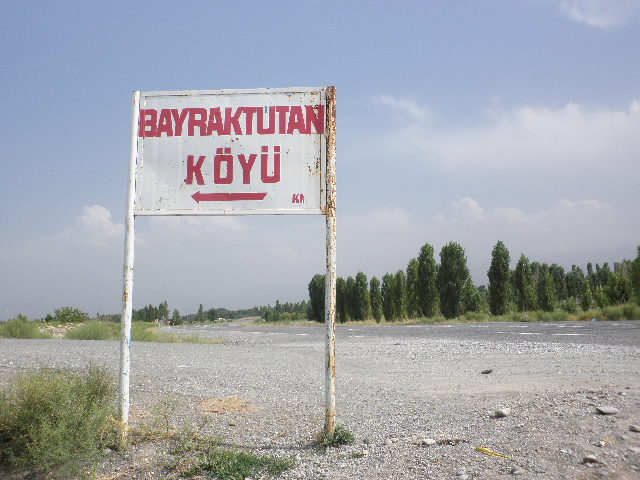

- Location within Turkey
- Coordinates: 40.0054°N 43.9105°E
- Country: Turkey
- Province: Iğdır
- District: Iğdır
- Elevation: 883 m (2,897 ft)
- Population (2022): 759
- Time zone: UTC+3 (TRT)

Bayraktutan is a village in Iğdır District, Iğdır Province, in eastern Turkey. Its population is 759 (2022). The village is populated by Azerbaijanis.

== Geography ==
The village lies to the east of Tuzluca, 17 kilometres (11 mi) by road west of the district capital of Iğdır.
