= Enginalan, Iğdır =

Enginalan
- Village
- Location within Turkey
- Coordinates: 39°57′56″N 44°1′56″E
- Country: Turkey
- Province: Iğdır
- District: Iğdır
- Elevation: 861 m (2,825 ft)
- Population (2022): 2,482
- Time zone: UTC+3 (TRT)
- Postal code: 76000
- Area code: 0476

Enginalan (Kurdish: Pilûr, Armenian: Բլուր, romanized: Blur), is a village in the Iğdır District of Iğdır Province, Turkey. Its population is 2,482 (2022). The village is populated by Azerbaijanis and Kurds.

== History ==
From the records of 1901 and 1928, we know the village was once called Blur in Armenian, which means mound.

Enginalan was an Armenian inhabited settlement prior to the Armenian-Turkish war in 1920, with a population of 2,244 in 1908.

== Notable people ==
- Grigor Yeghiazaryan, was a Soviet Armenian composer.

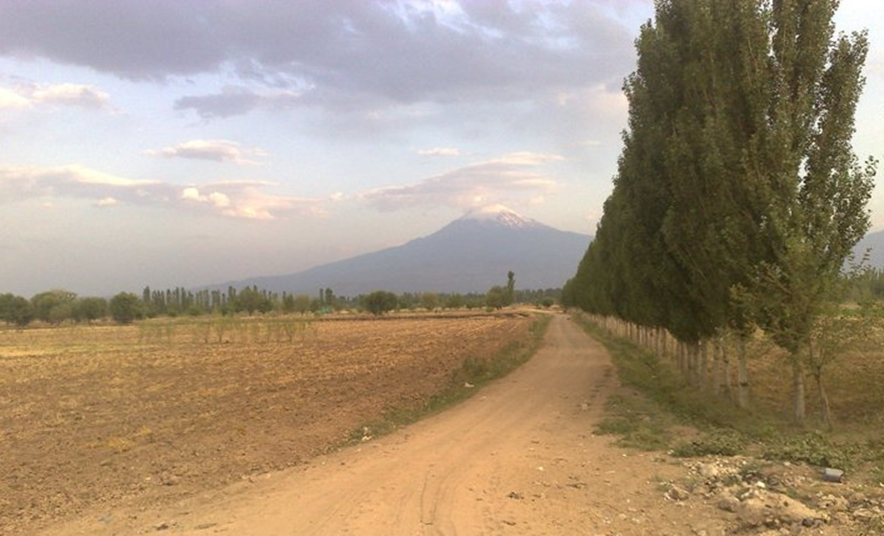
Mt. Ararat (Ağrı Dağı) from Enginalan
