= Iğdır District =

District of Iğdır Province, Turkey

- District
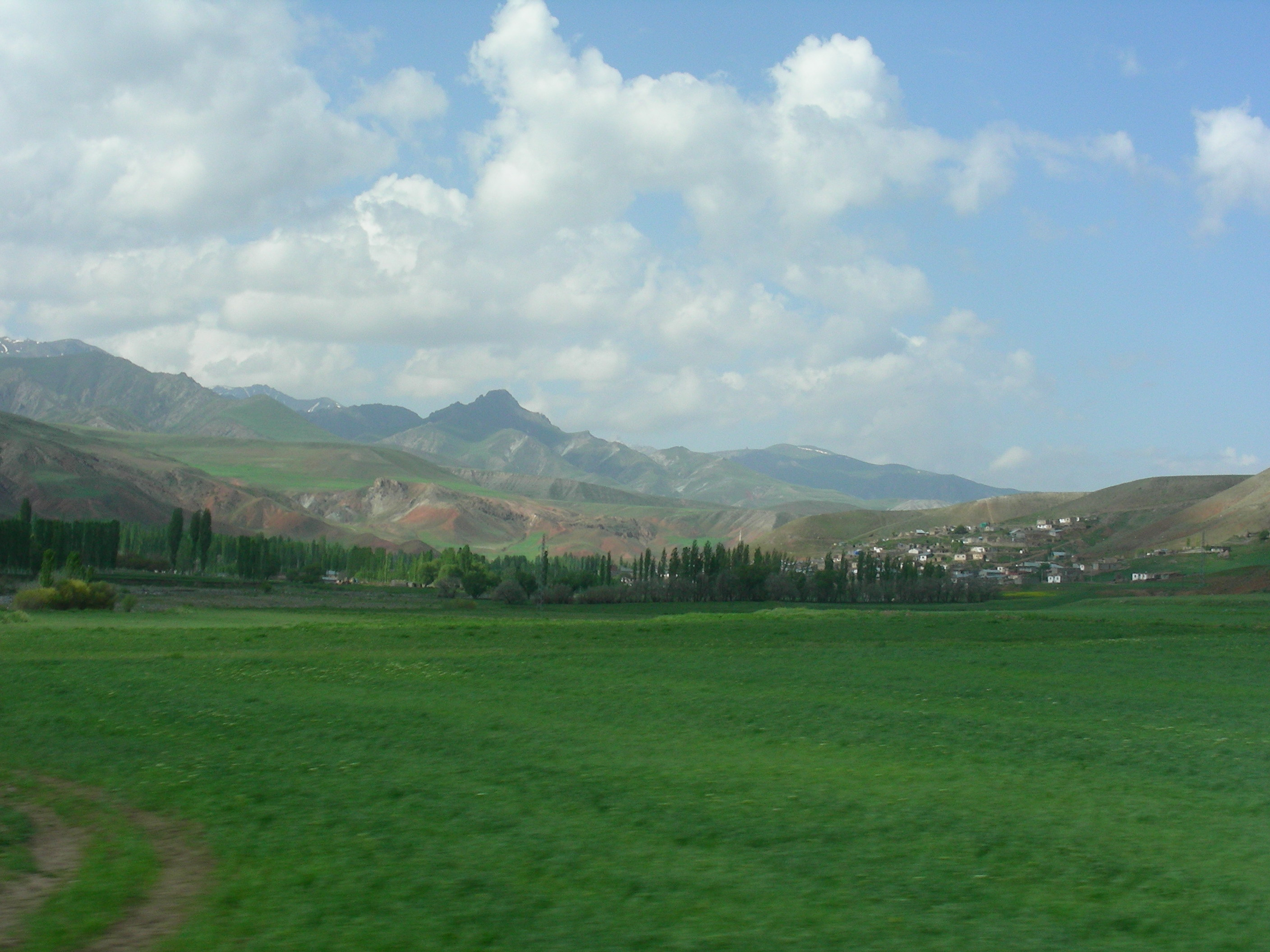
- near Karakuyu, Iğdır

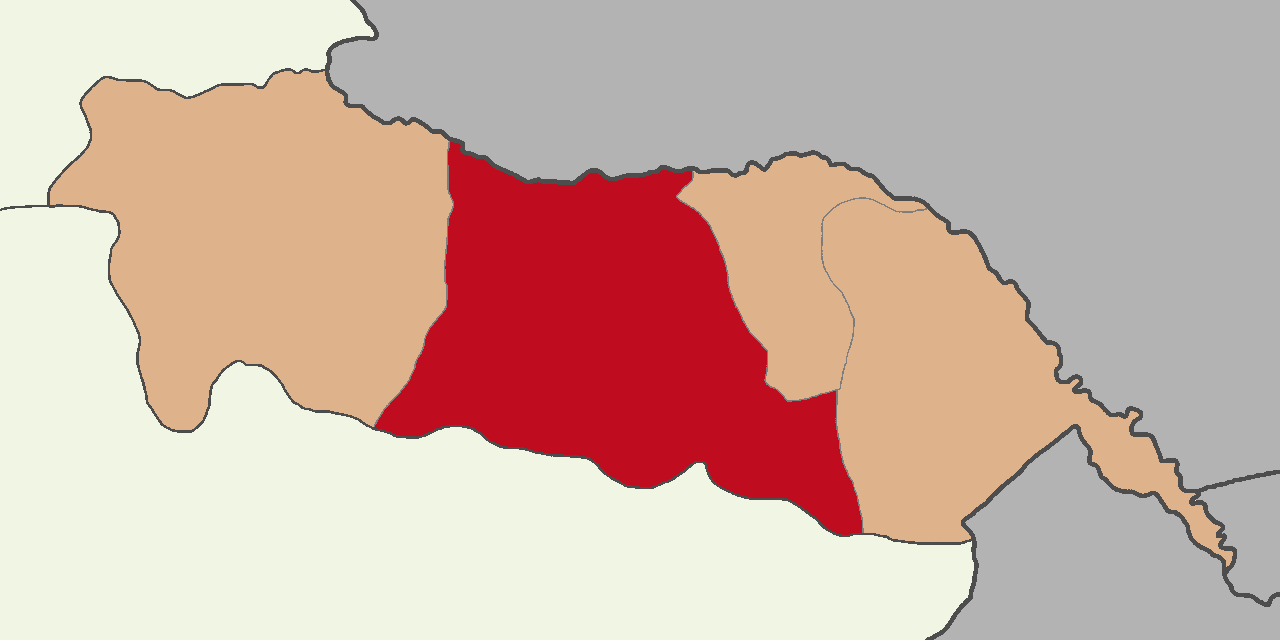
- Map showing Iğdır District in Iğdır Province

- Location within Turkey
- Coordinates: 39°55′N 44°03′E
- Country: Turkey
- Province: Iğdır
- Seat: Iğdır
- Area: 1,273 km^{2} (492 sq mi)
- Population (2022): 147,197
  - Density: 115.6/km^{2} (299.5/sq mi)
- Time zone: UTC+3 (TRT)

Iğdır District (also: Merkez, meaning "central" in Turkish) is a district of the Iğdır Province of Turkey. Its seat is the city of Iğdır. Its area is 1,273 km^{2}, and its population is 147,197 (2022). It lies on the border with Armenia.

== Composition ==
There are four municipalities in Iğdır District:

- Halfeli
- Hoşhaber
- Iğdır
- Melekli

There are 41 villages in Iğdır District:

- Ağaver
- Akyumak
- Alibeyköy
- Asma
- Aşağıçarıkçı
- Aşağıerhacı
- Bayraktutan
- Bendemurat
- Çakırtaş
- Çalpala
- Çilli
- Elmagöl
- Enginalan
- Evci
- Gülpınar
- Güngörmez
- Hakmehmet
- Harmandöven
- Kadıkışlak
- Karagüney
- Karakuyu
- Kasımcan
- Kavaktepe
- Kazancı
- Kuzugüden
- Küllük
- Mezraa
- Necefali
- Nişankaya
- Obaköy
- Örüşmüş
- Panik
- Pınarbaşı
- Sarıçoban
- Suveren
- Tacirli
- Taşlıca
- Yaycı
- Yukarıçarıkçı
- Yüzbaşılar
- Zor
