= Hoşhaber =

- Municipality
- Location in Turkey
- Coordinates: 39°54′N 43°58′E
- Country: Turkey
- Province: Iğdır
- District: Iğdır
- Elevation: 870 m (2,850 ft)
- Population (2022): 2,698
- Time zone: UTC+3 (TRT)
- Postal code: 76420
- Area code: 0476

Hoşhaber (Kurdish: Xoşxeber) is a town (belde) in the Iğdır District, Iğdır Province, Turkey. Its population is 2,698 (2022). It is situated in the extreme west of Iğdır plains. The distance to Iğdır is 7 kilometres (4.3 mi). The settlement was captured by the Russian Empire from Persia, but it was ceded to Turkey after the First World War. In 1998 the settlement was declared a seat of township.
