= Güngörmez, Iğdır =

Güngörmez
- Village
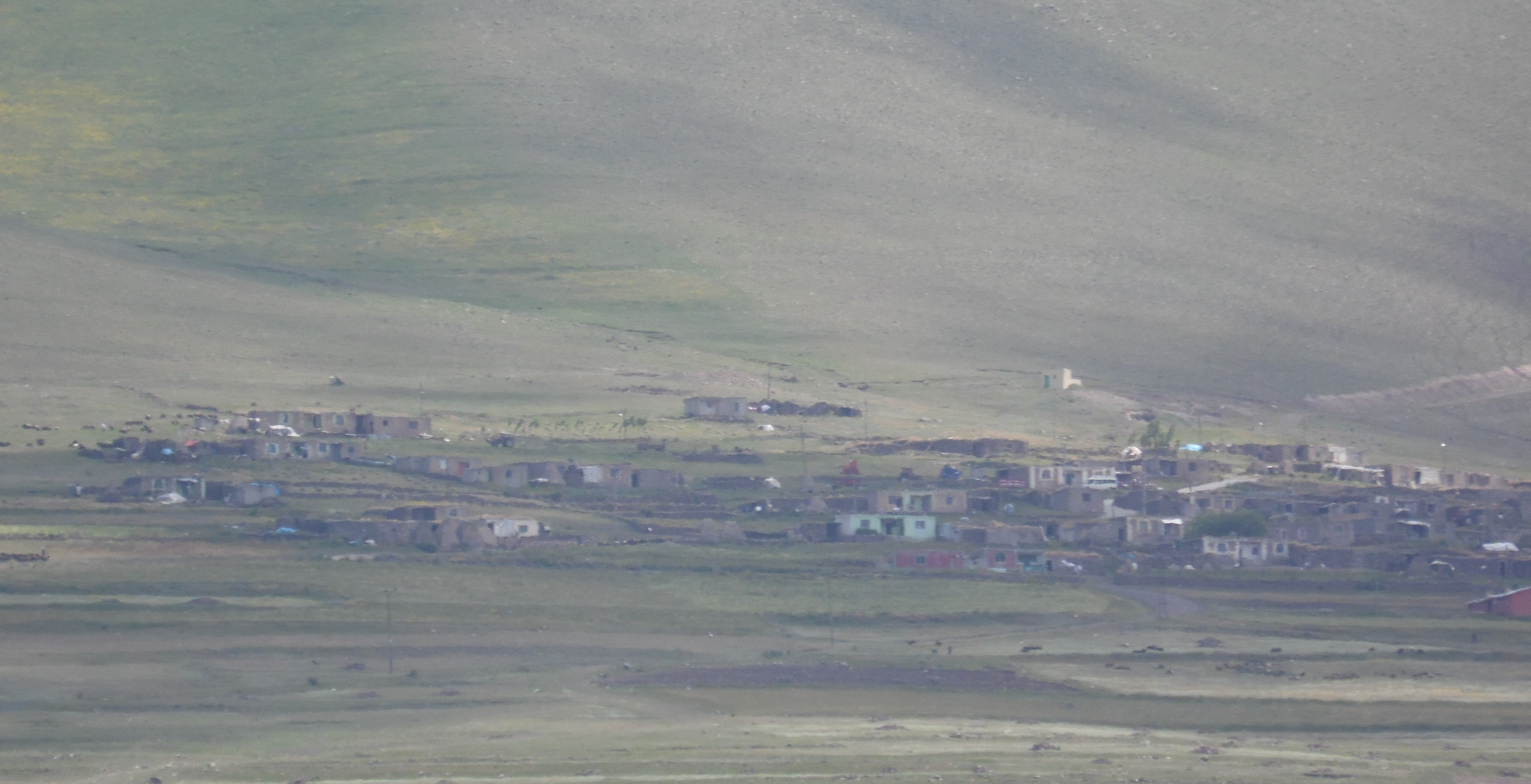

- Location within Turkey
- Coordinates: 39.7887°N 43.7545°E
- Country: Turkey
- Province: Iğdır
- District: Iğdır
- Area: 24.6 km^{2} (9.5 sq mi)
- Elevation: 2,171 m (7,123 ft)
- Population (2022): 268
  - Density: 10.9/km^{2} (28.2/sq mi)
- Time zone: UTC+3 (TRT)

Güngörmez is a village in the Iğdır District, Iğdır Province, in eastern Turkey. Its population is 268 (2022).

== Geography ==
The village lies to southeast of Tuzluca, 40 kilometres (25 mi) by road southwest of the district capital of Iğdır.
