= Küllük, Iğdır =

Küllük
- Village
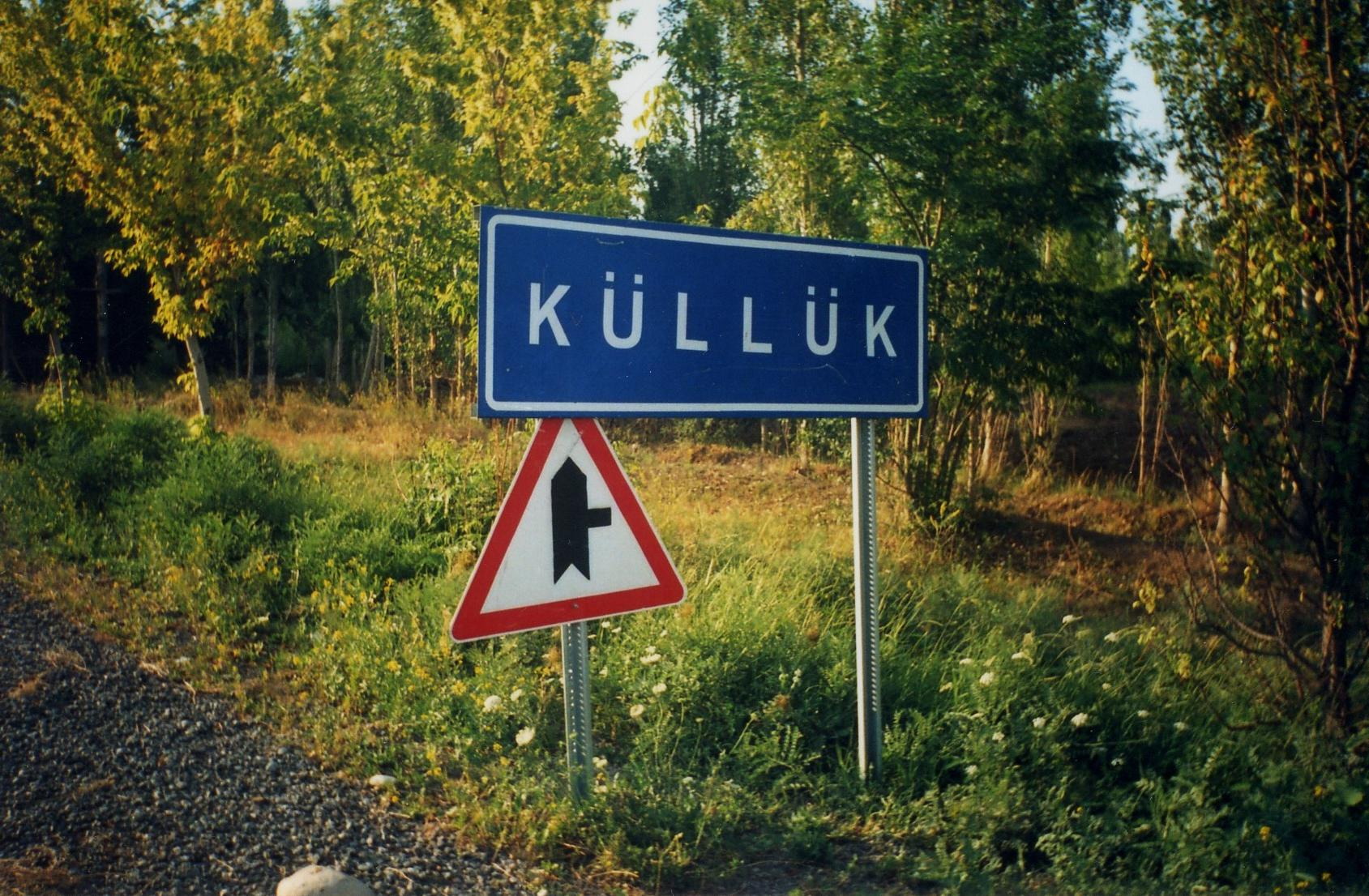

- Location within Turkey
- Coordinates: 39.9849°N 43.9188°E
- Country: Turkey
- Province: Iğdır
- District: Iğdır
- Elevation: 880 m (2,890 ft)
- Population (2022): 2,495
- Time zone: UTC+3 (TRT)

Küllük is a village in the Iğdır District, Iğdır Province, in eastern Turkey. Its population is 2,495 (2022). The village is populated by Azerbaijanis.

== History ==
The village is one of the 21 Muslim villages around Iğdır, which Armenian gangs raided and killed the men and raped the women in August 1919. On September 17, 1920, again a part of the village was murdered.

== Geography ==
The village lies to the east of Tuzluca, 15 kilometres (9.3 mi) by road west of the district capital of Iğdır.
