= Caucasian Tatars =

Caucasian Tatar is a historical exonym for Turkic-speaking Muslims living in the Caucasus region, used up to the early 20th century, and may refer to:

- Transcaucasian Tatars, modern Azerbaijani people living in Transcaucasia, called Tatars until Bolshevik Revolution
- North Caucasian Tatars or Dagestan Tatars, today known as the Kumyks of Dagestan
