= Çakırtaş, Iğdır =

Çakırtaş
- Village
- Location within Turkey
- Coordinates: 40°00′58″N 44°04′55″E
- Country: Turkey
- Province: Iğdır
- District: Iğdır
- Population (2022): 593
- Time zone: UTC+3 (TRT)

Çakırtaş is a village in the Iğdır District, Iğdır Province, in eastern Turkey. Its population is 593 (2022).
