= Halfeli =

- Municipality
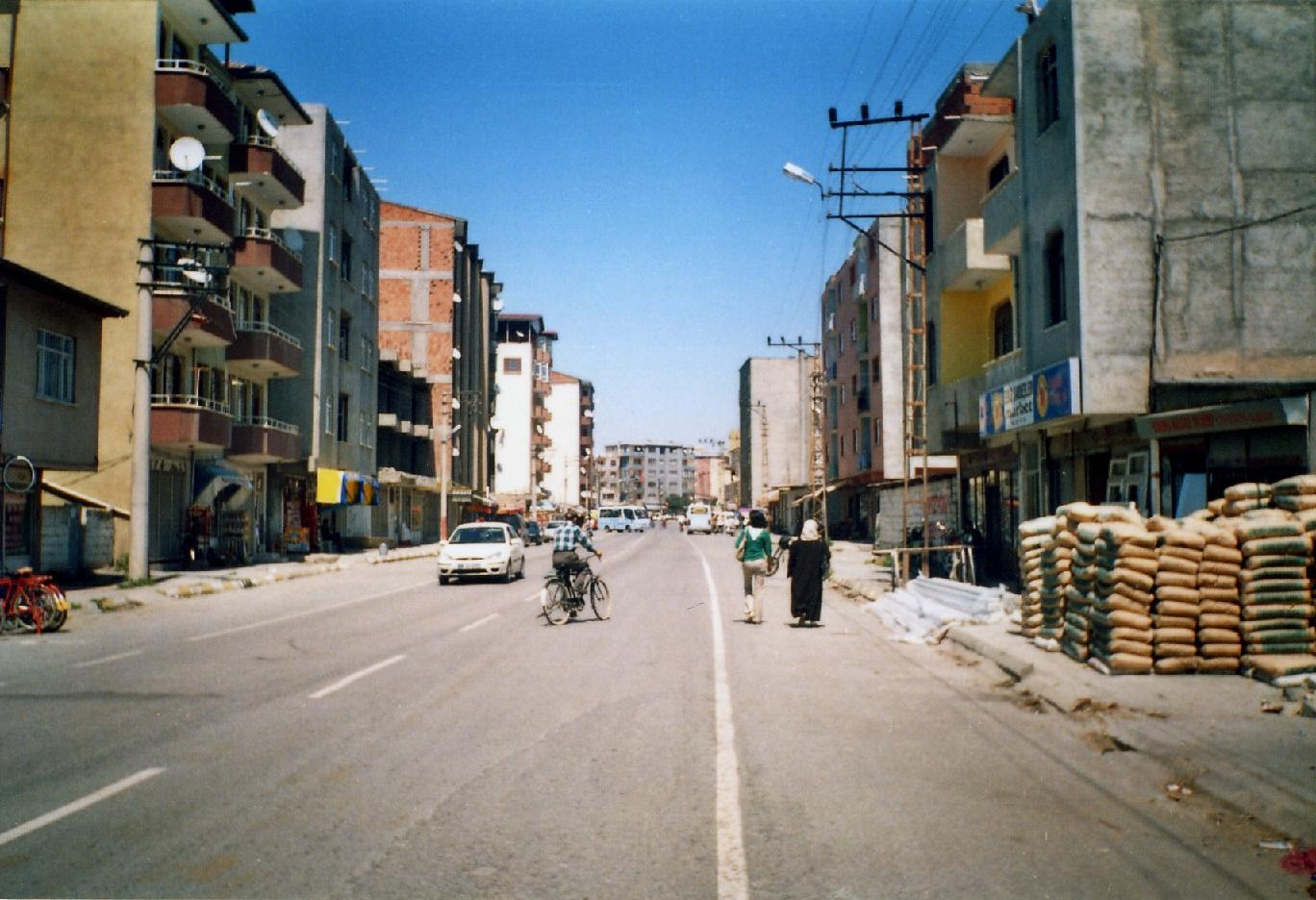

- Location within Turkey
- Coordinates: 39°53′11″N 43°59′20″E
- Country: Turkey
- Province: Iğdır
- District: Iğdır

Government
  - Elected Mayor: Hasan Safa (deposed) (HDP)
- Elevation: 870 m (2,850 ft)
- Population (2022): 8,271
- Time zone: UTC+3 (TRT)
- Postal code: 76410
- Area code: 0476

Halfeli (Kurdish: Xelfelî, previously in Armenian: Վանքատեղ, romanized: Vank’ategh,) is a town (belde) in the Iğdır District, Iğdır Province, Turkey. Its population is 8,271 (2022).

The towns economy relies on agriculture. Due to a climate milder than most other Eastern Anatolian towns, it has a variety of crops including cotton. Another revenue of the town is livestock trading.

In the local elections of March 2019, Hasan Safa from the Peoples' Democratic Party (HDP) was elected mayor. However, in March 2020 Safa was dismissed from his post due to alleged links to terrorism. Due to regulations introduced in September 2016, mayors suspended by terror related charges are not to be replaced by someone elected by the municipal council. Lütfullah Göktaş, the Kaymakam from Karakoyunlu was appointed as a trustee instead.

== History ==
On June 18, 1992, the town area was granted the status of municipality.

== Population ==
Before World War I, the population was Armenian.

Historical population

Year	Pop.	±% p.a.
1886	892	—
1908	1,114	+1.02%
1935	1,126	+0.04%
1940	1,103	−0.41%
1945	1,039	−1.19%
1950	1,134	+1.77%
1955	1,342	+3.43%
1960	1,753	+5.49%
1965	1,661	−1.07%
1970	1,991	+3.69%

Year	Pop.	±% p.a.
1975	2,505	+4.70%
1980	2,374	−1.07%
1985	3,003	+4.81%
1990	3,648	+3.97%
1997	4,515	+3.09%
2007	7,666	+5.44%
2012	7,693	+0.07%
2017	8,097	+1.03%
2022	8,271	+0.43%

Source: Russian censuses (1886–1908), population censuses (1935-1997) and TÜIK (2007-2022)
