= Panik, Vologda Oblast =

Panik Паник
- Village
- Location within Vologda Oblast Location within Russia
- Coordinates: 59°07′N 35°16′E
- Country: Russia
- Region: Vologda Oblast
- District: Chagodoshchensky District
- Time zone: UTC+3:00

Panik (Russian: Паник) is a rural locality (a village) in Belokrestskoye Rural Settlement, Chagodoshchensky District, Vologda Oblast, Russia. The population was 10 as of 2002.

== Geography ==
Panik is located 9 km (5.6 mi) southwest of Chagoda (the district's administrative centre) by road. Malashkino is the nearest rural locality.
