= Panik, Turkey =

Panik Բանիկ
- Village
- Location within Turkey
- Coordinates: 39°58′59″N 44°3′10″E
- Country: Turkey
- Province: Iğdır
- District: Iğdır
- Elevation: 861 m (2,825 ft)
- Population (2022): 2,671
- Time zone: UTC+3 (TRT)
- Postal code: 76000

Panik (Armenian: Բանիկ, romanized: Banik) is a köy (village) in the Iğdır District of Iğdır Province, Turkey. Its population is 2,671 (2022).

== Etymology ==
The village's name Panik is an antiquated word in Armenian referring to something artful or eloquent.

== History ==
Panik's name was changed in 1960 to Özdemir. However, the name was reverted to Panik in 2014.

Panik was an Armenian inhabited settlement prior to the Armenian-Turkish war in 1920, with a population of 960 in 1886.
