= Melekli, Iğdır =

Melekli
- Municipality
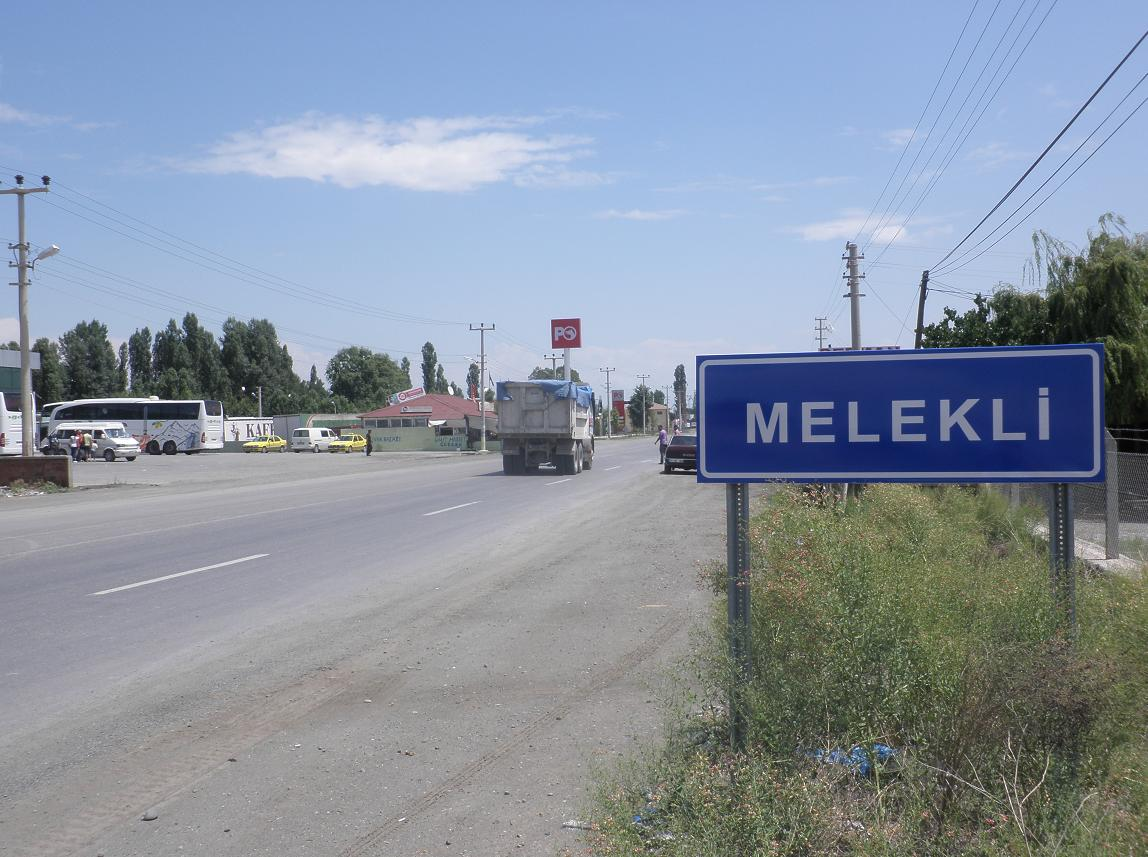

- Location within Turkey
- Coordinates: 39°56′44″N 44°05′39″E
- Country: Turkey
- Province: Iğdır
- District: Iğdır

Government
  - Mayor: Mücahit Tanık (MHP)
- Elevation: 856 m (2,808 ft)
- Population (2022): 3,594
- Time zone: UTC+3 (TRT)
- Postal code: 76410
- Area code: 0476
- Website: www.melekli.bel.tr

Melekli (Kurdish: Meleklî, previously in Armenian: հրեշտակային, romanized: Hreshtakayin, Azerbaijani: Mələkli, Russian: ангельский, romanized: Angel'skiy) is a town (belde) in the Iğdır District, Iğdır Province, Turkey. Its population is 3,594 (2022).

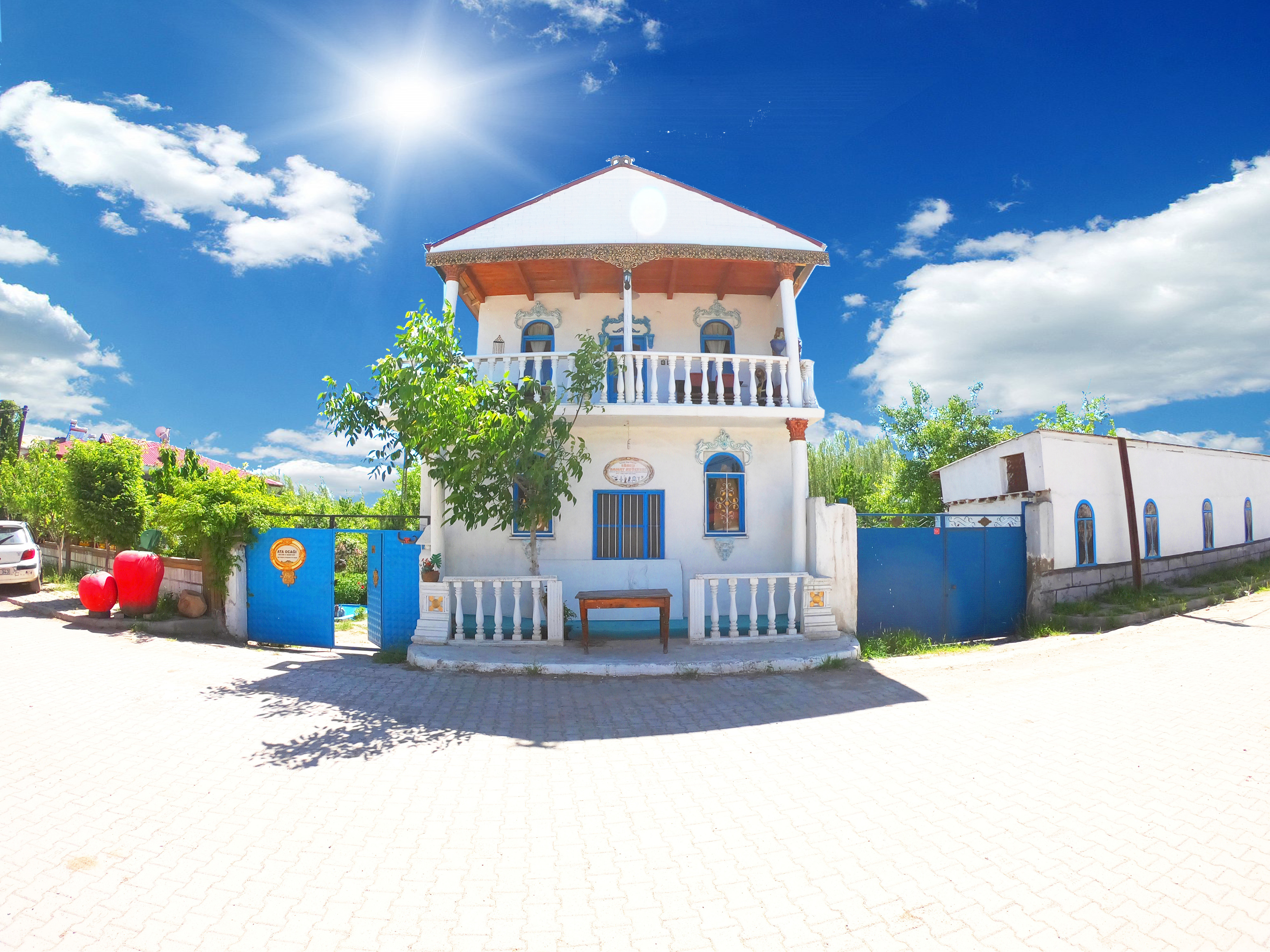
Culture and Art Center
