= Iğdır =

- Municipality
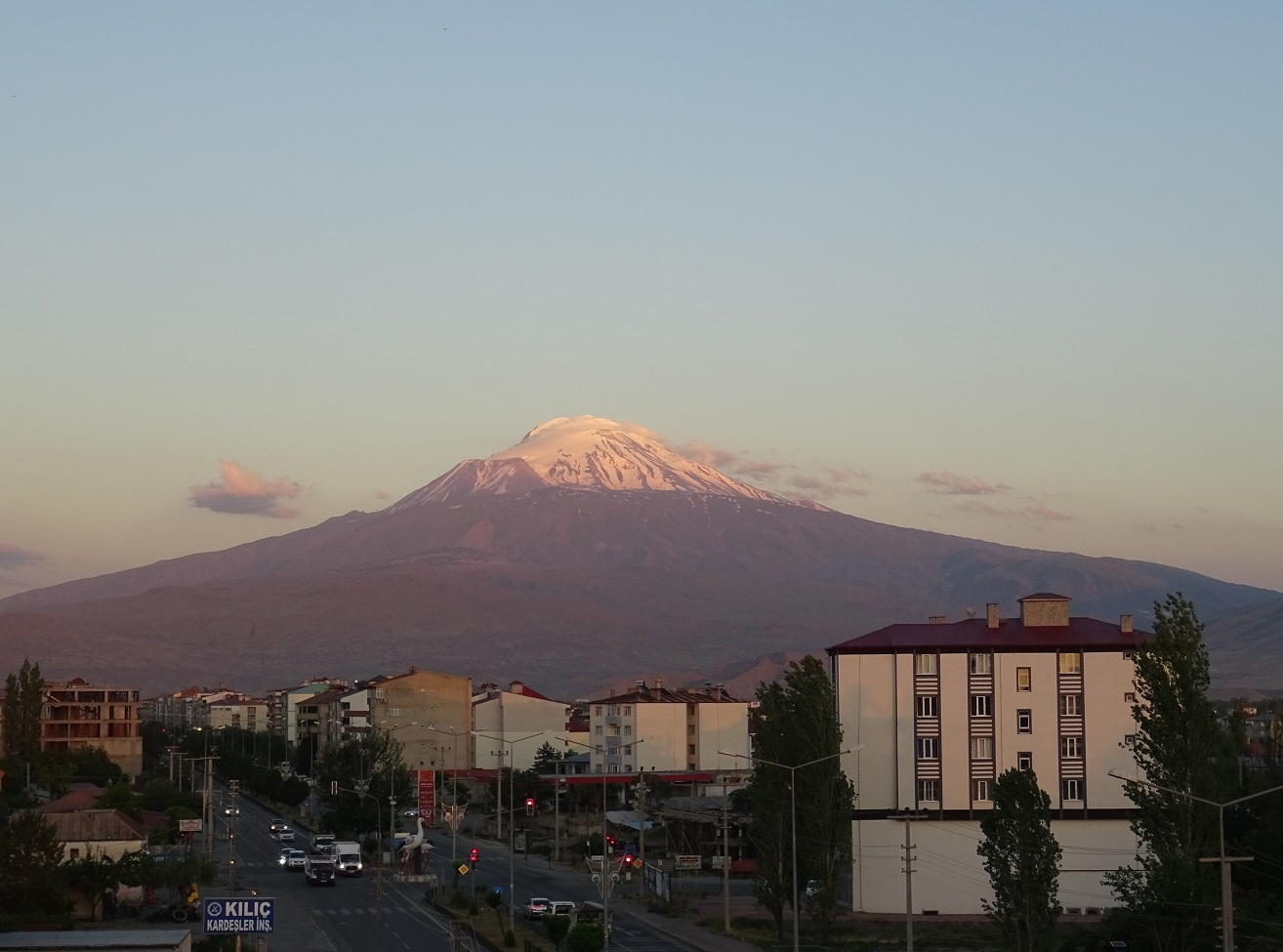
- Mount Ararat from Iğdır

- Coat of arms

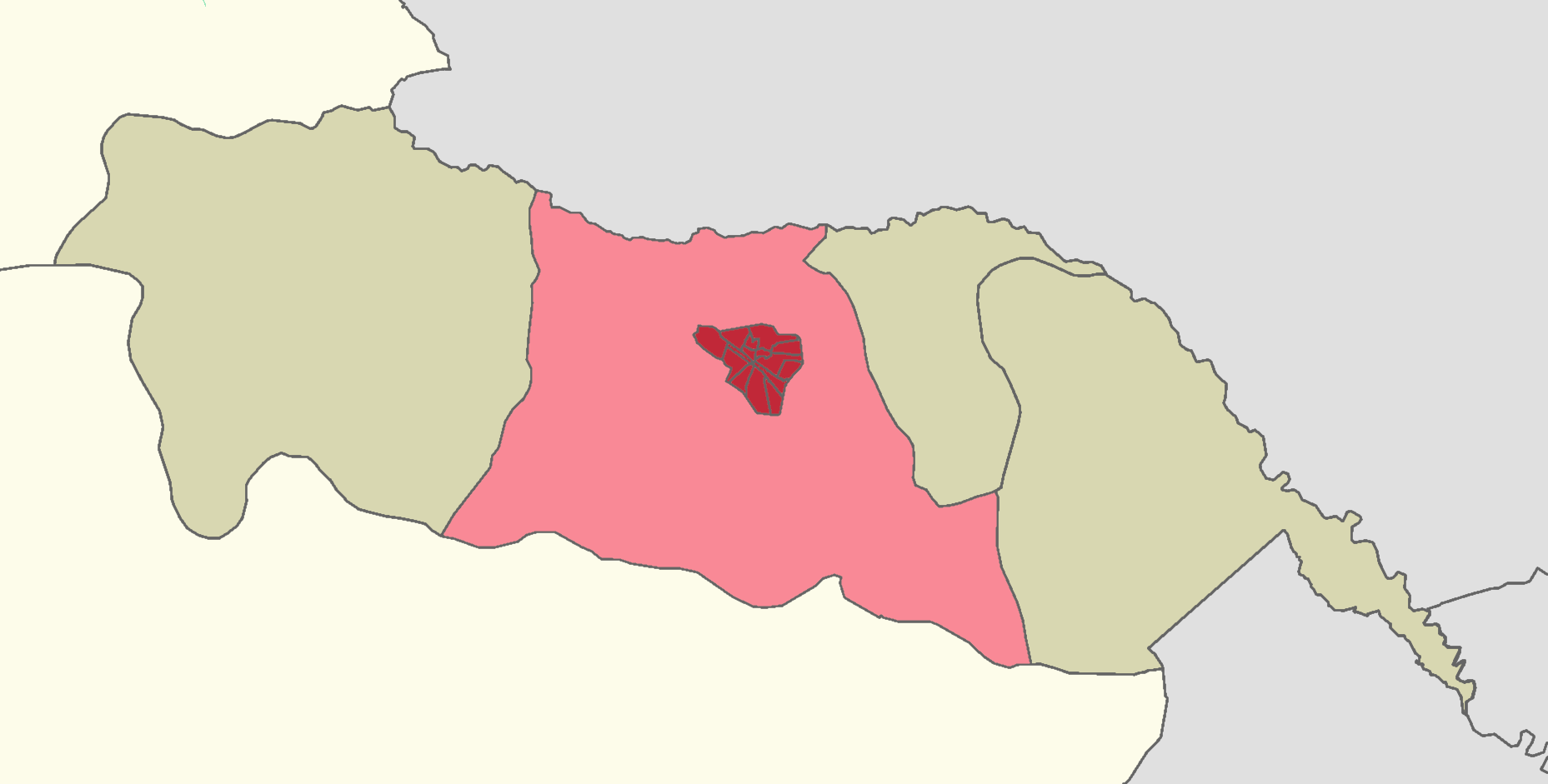
- Location within Iğdır Province

- Location within Turkey
- Coordinates: 39°55′15″N 44°02′40″E
- Country: Turkey
- Province: Iğdır
- District: Iğdır

Government
  - Mayor: Mehmet Nuri Güneş (DEM Party)
- Elevation: 850 m (2,790 ft)
- Population (2022): 101,700
- Time zone: UTC+3 (TRT)
- Postal code: 76000
- Area code: 0476
- Website: www.igdir.bel.tr

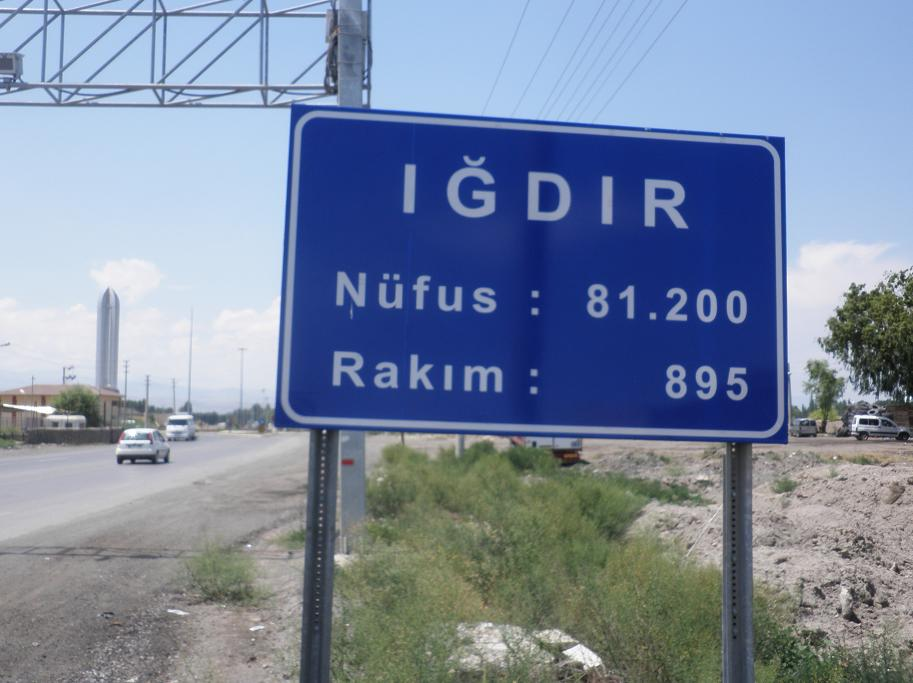
The entrance of Iğdır city

Iğdır (Turkish: [ˈɯːdɯɾ]; Armenian: Իգդիր, romanized: Igdir or Ցոլակերտ, Tsʿolakert; Azerbaijani: İğdır; Kurdish: Îdir or Reşqelas) is a city in the Eastern Anatolia region of Turkey. It is the seat of Iğdır Province and Iğdır District. Its population is 101,700 (2022).

== History ==
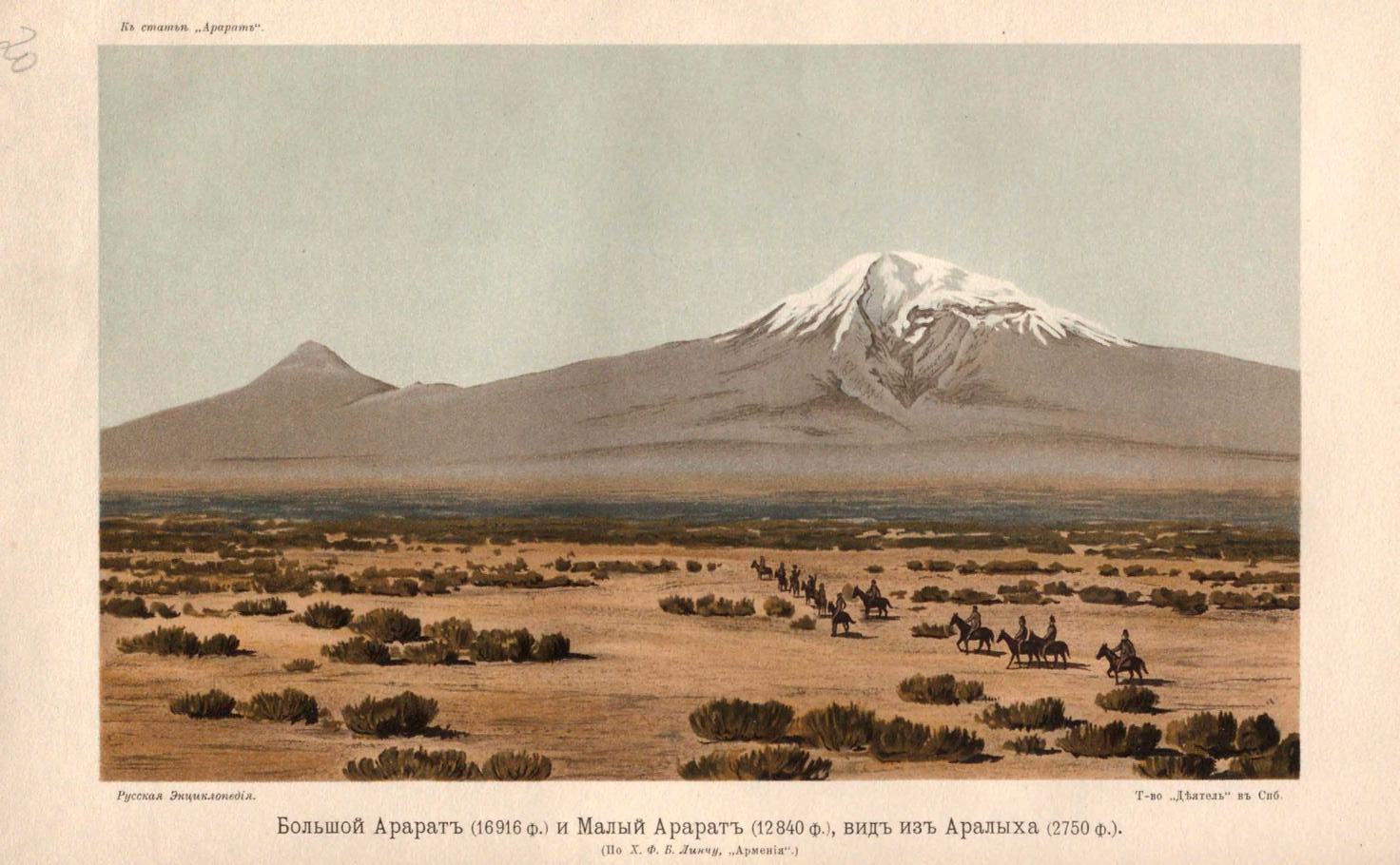
Greater and Lesser Ararat, view from Aralık, 1911

Iğdır went by the Armenian name of Tsolakert during the Middle Ages. When the Spanish traveler Ruy González de Clavijo passed through this region in the early 15th century, he stayed a night in a castle he called Egida, located at the foot of Mount Ararat. Clavijo describes it as being built upon a rock and ruled by a woman, the widow of a brigand that Timur had put to death. Because modern Iğdır has no such rock, and is a considerable distance from the Ararat foothills, it is believed that medieval Iğdır was located at a different site, at a place also known as Tsolakert, now called Taşburun. Russian excavations there at the end of the 19th century discovered the ruins of houses and what was identified as a church, as well as traces of fortifications. The settlement may have been abandoned after an earthquake in 1664. In 1555 the town became a part of the Safavid Empire, remaining under Persian rule (with brief military occupations by the Ottomans in 1514, between 1534–35, 1548–49, 1554–55, 1578–1605, 1635–36 and 1722–46) until it fell into the hands of the Russian Empire after the Russo-Persian War of 1826-1828.

=== Modern history ===
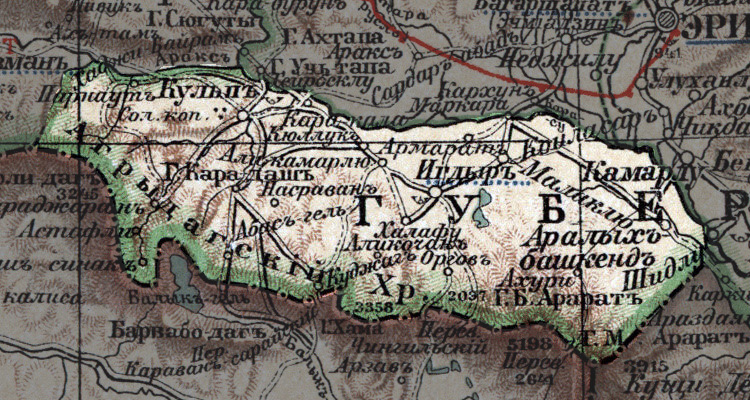
The Surmali uyezd in 1903

Iğdır, or Igdir, was taken by the Russian Empire from Persia after the latter's defeat in the Russo-Persian War of 1826-1828. It was organized as part of the Armenian Oblast in 1828 and made a part of the Georgia-Imeretia Governorate in 1840, and then the Surmalu Uyezd of the Erivan Governorate in 1850. According to the Russian family lists accounts from 1886, of the total 30,647 inhabitants of the district 11,868 were Tatars (38.7%, later known as Azerbaijanis), 15,204 Armenians (49.6%) and 3,575 Kurds (11.7%). An 1894 publication counted 2,912 Armenians living in the town. Under Russian rule, two primary schools, one for boys and the other for girls, and three churches were opened and 100 Armenian families were allowed to move to Igdir. The town's population rose to 10,000 in 1914 and largely busied itself with agriculture and commerce.

Following the Russian Revolution of October 1917, the area came under the control of a temporary administrative committee created by the three main ethnic groups (Armenians, Azerbaijanis and Georgians) in the South Caucasus. Though it attempted to negotiate a truce with the Ottoman Empire, Ottoman forces launched an eastward offensive and took Igdir on May 20, 1918. They occupied it until the signing of the Armistice of Mudros in November 1918. The Republic of Armenia then assumed control over Igdir. The Armenian population suffered heavily during the grueling winter of 1918–19, as famine, disease and the cold killed many. In May 1919, its status was elevated to that of a city.

Based on the boundaries drawn by U.S. State Department in November 1920, Igdir was envisaged to become a part of the Republic of Armenia. However, in September 1920 the government of the Grand National Assembly of Turkey led by Mustafa Kemal launched a war to eliminate the republic and overran Igdir. Turkish General Kâzım Karabekir commanded the armies but his forces were initially unable to take Igdir due to strong Armenian resistance. However, within a few days, on October 20, 1920, the Turkish Army managed to drive the Armenian forces out of the city and went on to capture Gyumri. According to official Turkish documents, after their defeat in the Shahtahti area, Armenian forces abandoned Iğdır. They burned the Markara Bridge which spanned the Aras river and retreated to the northern bank on November 13, 1920. Turkey annexed the region of Iğdır after the conclusion of several peace treaties, and its territorial gains were mainly formalized under the 1921 Treaty of Kars.

In the early years of the Republic of Turkey, Igdir, now Iğdır, was a district of the province of Bayazıt. It was made a part of the Kars Province in 1934 and remained part of it until it became the seat of the newly formed Iğdır Province on 27 May 1992.

== Government ==
In the municipal elections of March 2019, Yaşar Akkuş from the Peoples' Democratic Party (HDP) was elected mayor. He was dismissed due to terror related investigations on 15 May 2020, and Enver Ünlü, the Governor of the province, was appointed as a trustee for the municipality on the same day.

== Geography ==
The city of Iğdır sits on a plain at a lower altitude than most of Turkey's eastern provinces. This allows agricultural production including apples, tomatoes, cucumbers, peaches, pears, sugar beet, watermelons and melons. However, the most famous produce of Iğdır are cotton and apricots.

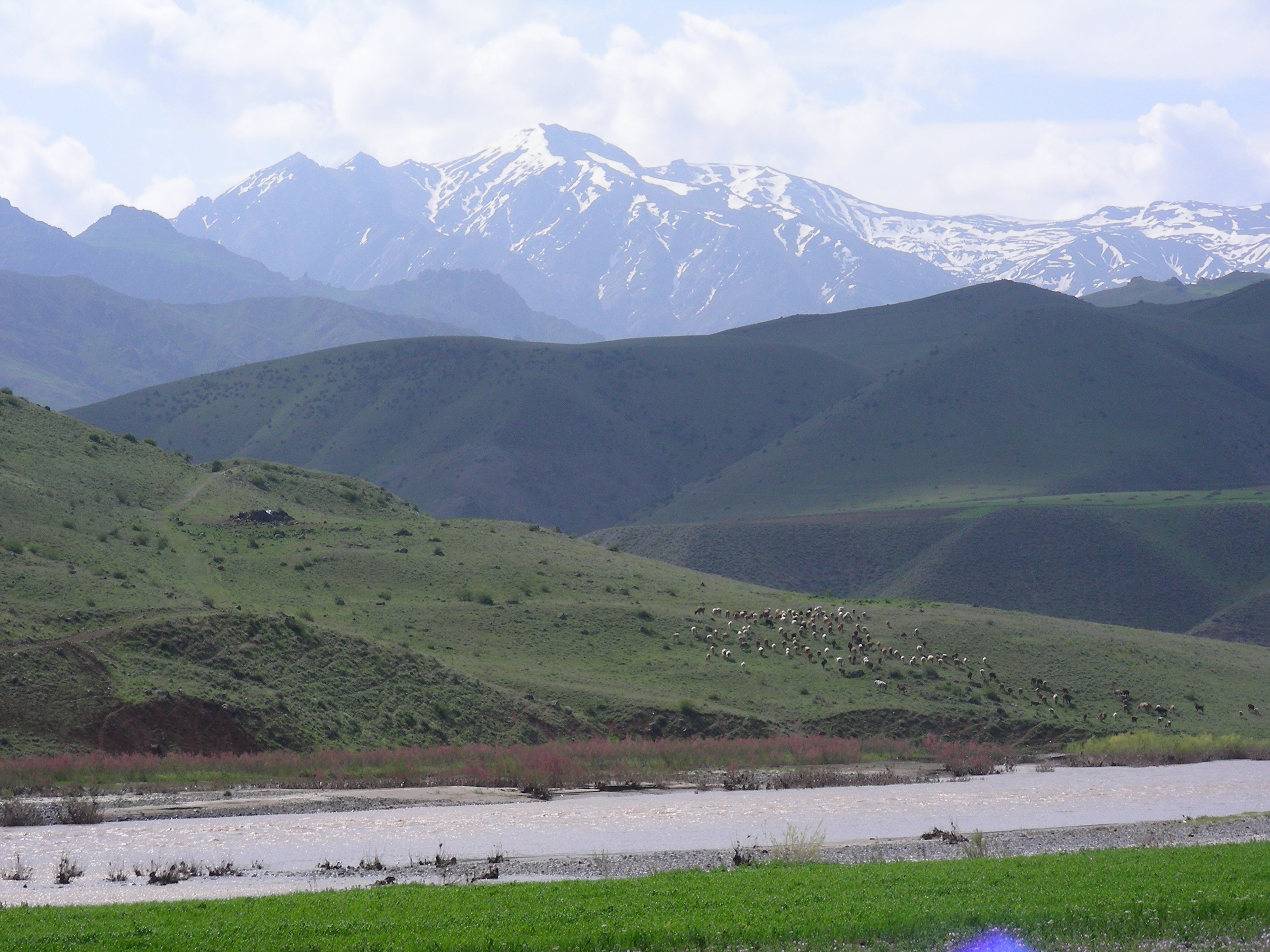
Nature in Iğdır

=== Climate ===
Iğdır has a continental semi-arid climate (Köppen: BSk, Trewartha: BS) with hot, dry summers and cold, snowy winters. Iğdır is the driest city in Turkey, averaging 261 mm (10.3 in) of precipitation per year.

Climate data for Iğdır (1991–2020, extremes 1941–2023)
Month	Jan	Feb	Mar	Apr	May	Jun	Jul	Aug	Sep	Oct	Nov	Dec	Year
Record high °C (°F)	18.3 (64.9)	22.2 (72.0)	29.5 (85.1)	33.4 (92.1)	35.9 (96.6)	39.2 (102.6)	41.5 (106.7)	42.0 (107.6)	38.4 (101.1)	33.0 (91.4)	26.2 (79.2)	22.2 (72.0)	42.0 (107.6)
Mean daily maximum °C (°F)	2.4 (36.3)	6.5 (43.7)	14.0 (57.2)	20.0 (68.0)	24.7 (76.5)	30.2 (86.4)	33.8 (92.8)	33.7 (92.7)	29.1 (84.4)	21.8 (71.2)	12.9 (55.2)	4.6 (40.3)	19.5 (67.1)
Daily mean °C (°F)	−2.7 (27.1)	0.7 (33.3)	7.6 (45.7)	13.4 (56.1)	17.9 (64.2)	22.9 (73.2)	26.5 (79.7)	26.2 (79.2)	21.1 (70.0)	14.0 (57.2)	6.0 (42.8)	−0.3 (31.5)	12.8 (55.0)
Mean daily minimum °C (°F)	−6.7 (19.9)	−4.1 (24.6)	1.8 (35.2)	7.2 (45.0)	11.6 (52.9)	15.9 (60.6)	19.5 (67.1)	19.0 (66.2)	13.9 (57.0)	7.7 (45.9)	0.7 (33.3)	−4.1 (24.6)	6.9 (44.4)
Record low °C (°F)	−28.4 (−19.1)	−28.0 (−18.4)	−22.2 (−8.0)	−7.6 (18.3)	0.1 (32.2)	2.4 (36.3)	8.0 (46.4)	7.2 (45.0)	1.6 (34.9)	−7.0 (19.4)	−15.6 (3.9)	−30.3 (−22.5)	−30.3 (−22.5)
Average precipitation mm (inches)	13.3 (0.52)	14.7 (0.58)	21.4 (0.84)	42.0 (1.65)	50.1 (1.97)	30.0 (1.18)	14.9 (0.59)	9.4 (0.37)	12.1 (0.48)	24.1 (0.95)	19.5 (0.77)	14.3 (0.56)	265.8 (10.46)
Average precipitation days	5.97	6.27	7.7	12.6	16.3	10.6	5.9	4.73	4.87	8.37	6.37	7.37	97.05
Average relative humidity (%)	66	58.5	48.1	48.3	50.5	43.5	40.7	41.5	46.8	60	64.7	69	53.1
Mean monthly sunshine hours	83.7	124.3	170.5	180.0	229.4	282.0	306.9	291.4	252.0	180.0	136.4	77.5	2,314.1
Mean daily sunshine hours	2.7	4.4	5.5	6.0	7.4	9.4	9.9	9.4	8.4	6.0	4.4	2.5	6.3
Source 1: Turkish State Meteorological Service
Source 2: NOAA(humidity)

== Health ==
Air pollution is a chronic problem in Iğdır, mainly due to the burning of coal. In 2021, Iğdır became the Europe’s most polluted city.

Turkish MPs and specialists claim that the Armenian Nuclear Power Plant in Metsamor, a border town in Armenia, poses a health risk to Iğdır residents. Turkish sources allege that cancer cases have increased in the region because of the power plant.

== Architecture ==
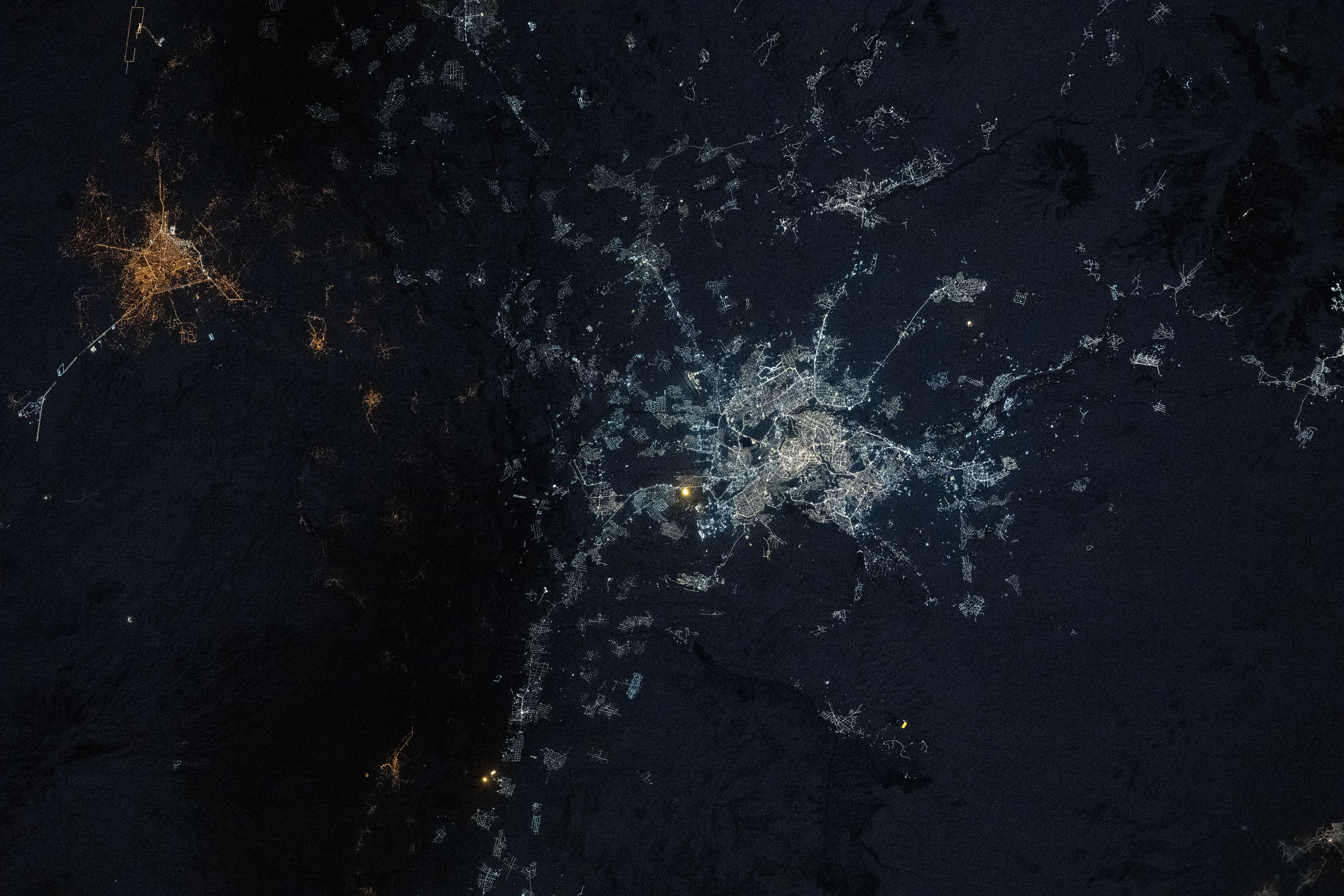
The city lights of Yerevan, Armenia, and Iğdır, Türkiye

On a peninsula close to the closed border with Armenia, and currently within a military zone, near the village of Sürmeli, stands the ruins of the medieval city of Surmari, with a citadel whose surviving walls date from 1224. A restored 13th-century Armenian caravanserai known as the Caravanserai of Zor is another historical structure in the vicinity.

=== Iğdır Genocide Memorial and Museum ===
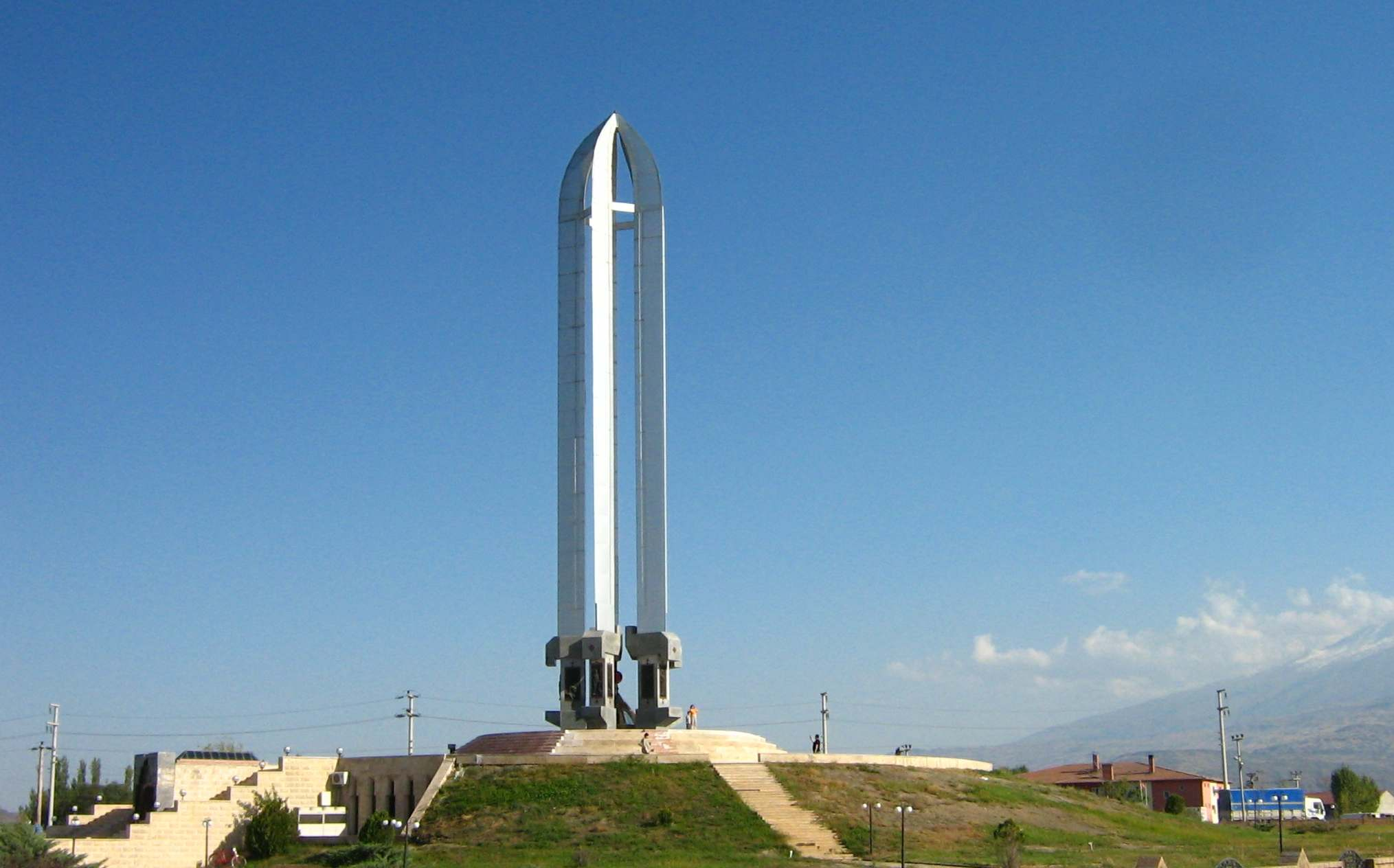
Iğdır Genocide Memorial and Museum

The Iğdır Genocide Memorial and Museum, is a memorial-museum complex which promotes Armenian-genocide denial. Construction on the memorial began in August 1997, and was opened to the public on October 5, 1999 by the Turkish Minister of State Ramazan Mirzaoğlu. The memorial was built to commemorate the alleged massacres and persecution by Armenians of Muslims during World War I and the Turkish–Armenian War. Most scholars see it as a case of Armenian Genocide denial, seeking to promote an alternate psuedohistoric narrative that blames the genocide on Armenians.

== Cuisine ==
Increasing agricultural production and the opening of a border gate with Nakhchivan in 1992 have enabled the town to be livelier and wealthier than its neighbours in the generally impoverished eastern Turkey. There are many cafes and restaurants. The best-known dish is a meat stew called bozbaş.

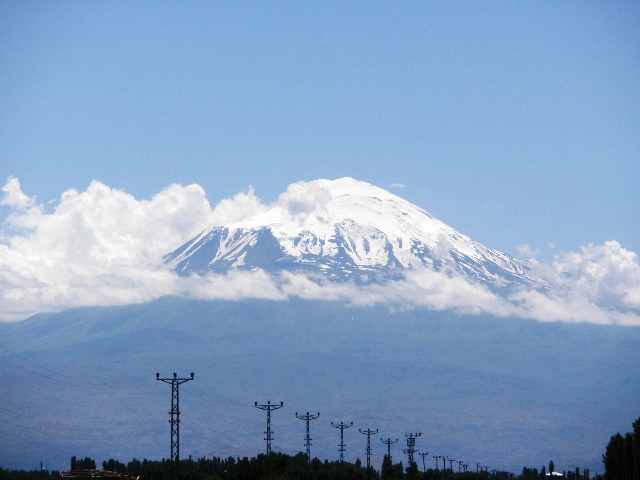
Mount Ararat as seen from Iğdır

== Economy ==
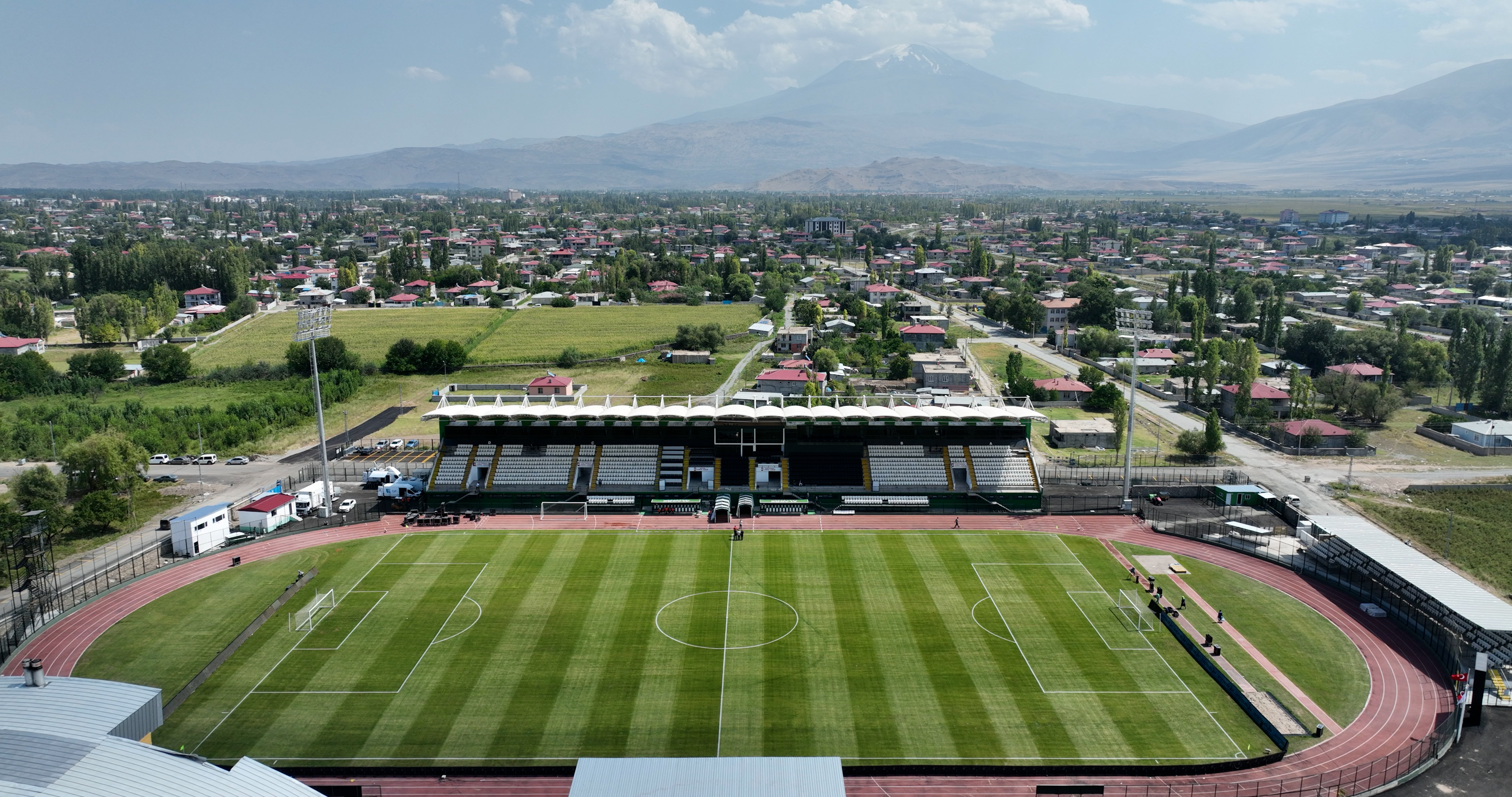
Iğdır city stadium

The main economic activities in Iğdır are the commerce of agricultural and animal products.

The city of Iğdır is located between Kars and Ağrı. Despite the fact that it has three strategically important neighbours, the border gate to Armenia is closed and there is no direct access to Iran, therefore this situation diminishes economic possibilities.

About 70% percent of Mount Ararat's area lies within Iğdır's borders, however the investments for developing tourism in Mt. Ararat is paid to Ağrı Municipality.

== Demographics ==
According to the Russian family lists accounts from 1886, of the total 71,066 inhabitants of the districts 34,351 were Azerbaijanis (48.3%, mentioned as 'Tatars' in the source), 22,096 Armenians (31.1%) and 14,619 Kurds (20.6%). According to the Russian Empire Census in 1897 Iğdır had a population of 4,680, of which 3,934 (84%) were Armenians, and 559 (12%) were Russians. The province is populated by Azerbaijanis and Kurds.

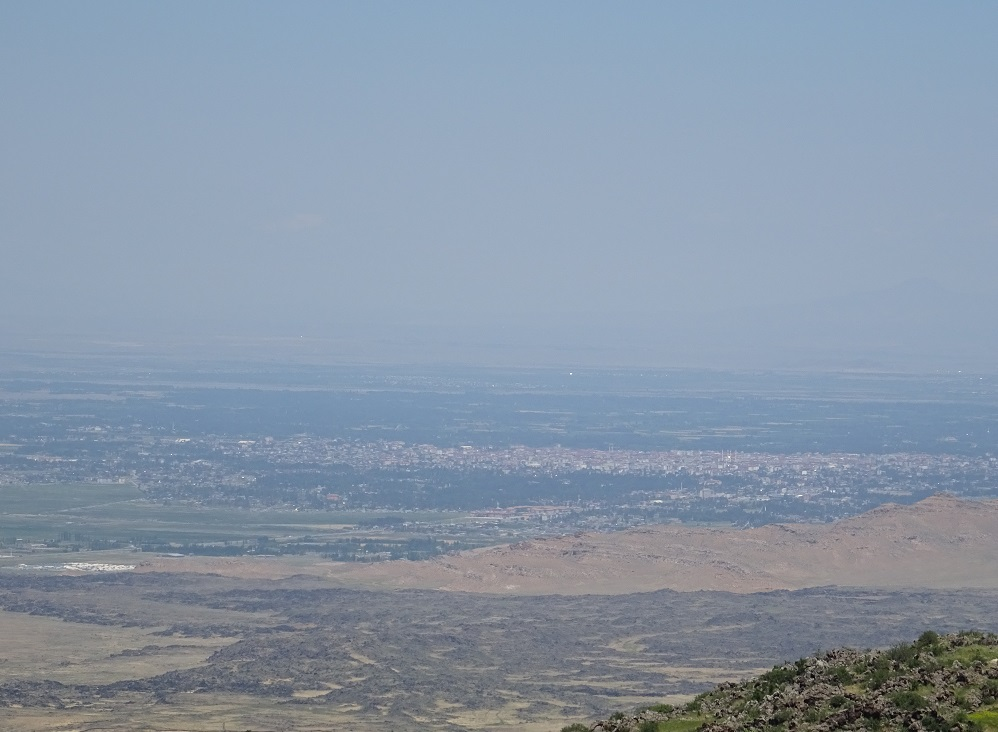
Iğdır as seen from Mount Ararat

Historical population

Year	Pop.	±% p.a.
1970	21,420	—
1975	29,542	+6.64%
1980	24,352	−3.79%
1985	29,460	+3.88%
1990	35,858	+4.01%

Year	Pop.	±% p.a.
1997	45,941	+3.60%
2007	75,927	+5.15%
2012	82,656	+1.71%
2017	91,261	+2.00%
2022	101,700	+2.19%

Source: Population censuses (1970-1997) and TÜIK (2007-2022)

== Transport ==
Transport to Iğdır is via roads or air. Turkish state route D.080 and European route E99 pass through Iğdır.
Iğdır Airport, opened in 2012, serves the city with internal flights to Istanbul and Ankara.
Regular bus services connect the city to major national and regional centres.
There is, as of 2016, no rail transport to Iğdır, but it will be a stop on the Nakhchivan-Kars railway when it is completed.

== Notable people ==
- Avetis Aharonian, Armenian politician
- Servet Çetin, Turkey national football team player of Azerbaijani descent
- Eduard Isabekyan, Armenian painter
- Drastamat Kanayan, Armenian military commander
- Verjaluys Mirijanyan, Armenian actress and Honored Artist of Armenia.
- Sinan Oğan, Turkish politician; won a seat in the Turkish parliament in 2011 with the right-wing Nationalist Movement Party
- Şahin Yakut, Turkish kickboxer and MMA fighter

== International relations ==
=== Diplomatic missions ===
Azerbaijan maintains a consular mission in Iğdır.

=== Twin towns – sister cities ===
Iğdır is twinned with:

- Sharur, Nakhchivan Autonomous Republic, Azerbaijan
- Shamakhi, Azerbaijan

== Sport in Iğdır ==
- Iğdırspor
- Iğdır F.K.
