= Iğdır Province =

Coordinates: 39°53′37″N 43°59′52″E

Iğdır Province Iğdır ili
- Province
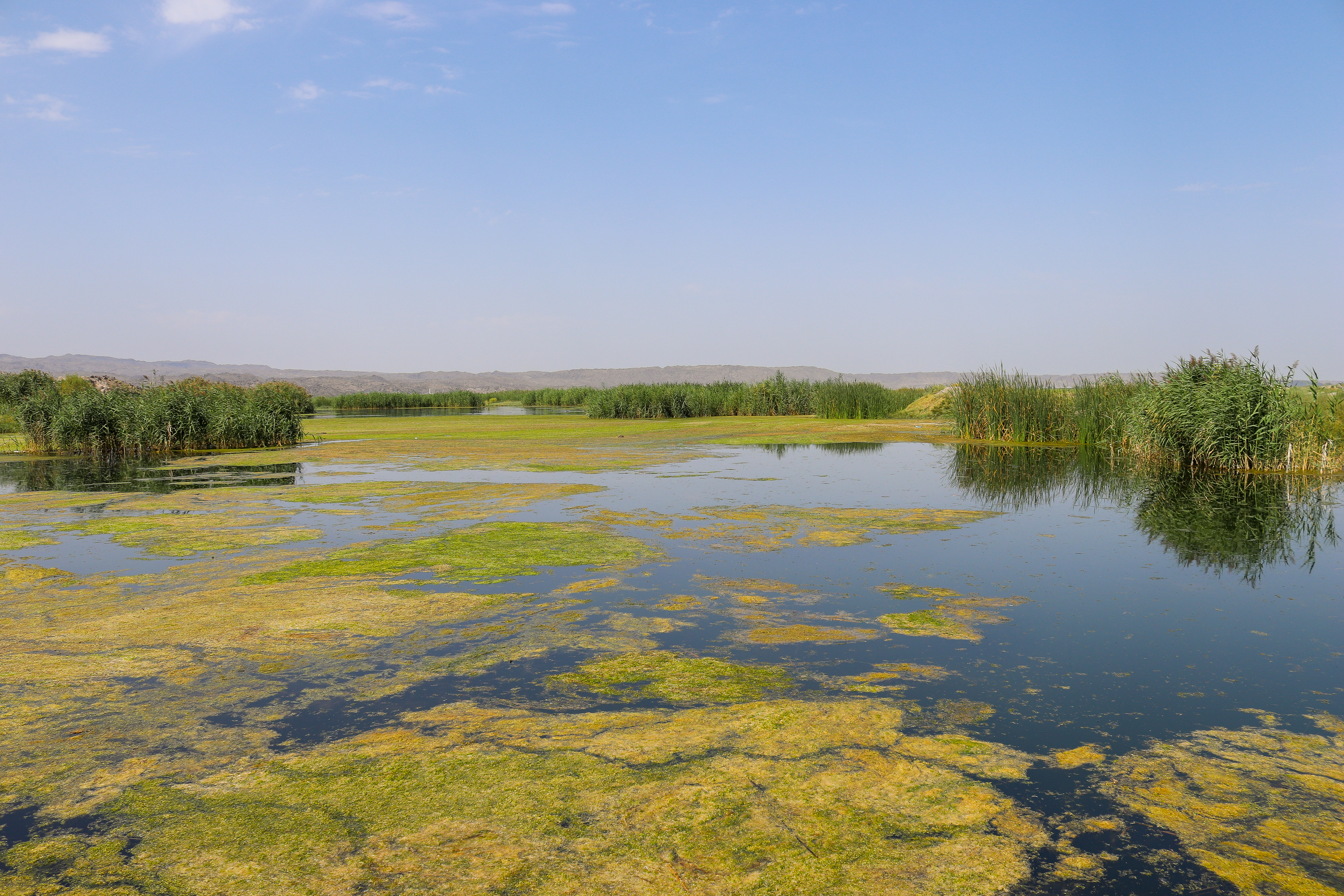
- Aras River Karasi Stream

- Location of the province within Turkey
- Country: Turkey
- Seat: Iğdır

Government
  - Governor: Mustafa Fırat Taşolar
- Area: 3,664 km^{2} (1,415 sq mi)
- Population (2022): 203,594
  - Density: 55.57/km^{2} (143.9/sq mi)
- Time zone: UTC+3 (TRT)
- Area code: 0476
- Website: www.igdir.gov.tr

Iğdır Province (Turkish: Iğdır ili, Kurdish: Parêzgeha Îdirê, Azerbaijani: İğdır ili, Armenian: Իգդիրի մարզ, romanized: Igdiri marz) is a province in eastern Turkey, located along the borders with Armenia, Azerbaijan (the area of Nakhchivan Autonomous Republic), and Iran. Its adjacent provinces are Kars to the northwest and Ağrı to the west and south. Its area is 3,664 km^{2}, and its population is 203,594 (2022). Its population was 168,634 in 2000 and 142,601 in 1990. The province is considered part of Turkish Kurdistan and has a Kurdish majority with a pretty close Azerbaijani minority.

The province was created in 1992 from the southeastern part of Kars Province. The current Governor of the province is Ercan Turan. Being the highest mountain in Armenian Highlands, Mount Ararat (Ağrı Dağı) is at present in Turkey's Iğdır province, but much of the land is a wide plain far below the mountain. The climate is the warmest in this part of Turkey; cotton can be grown in Iğdır. The closed border with Armenia follows the Aras River.

The provincial capital is the city of Iğdır.

== Districts ==
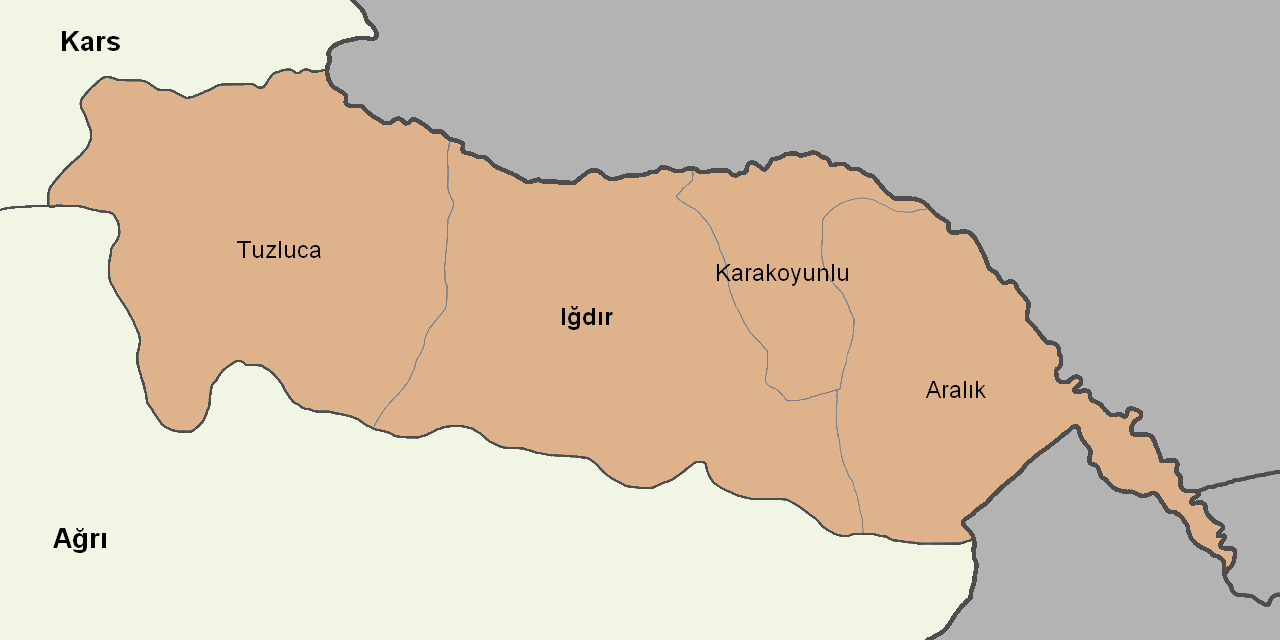

Iğdır province is divided into four districts (capital district in bold):

- Aralık
- **Iğdır**
- Karakoyunlu
- Tuzluca

== History ==
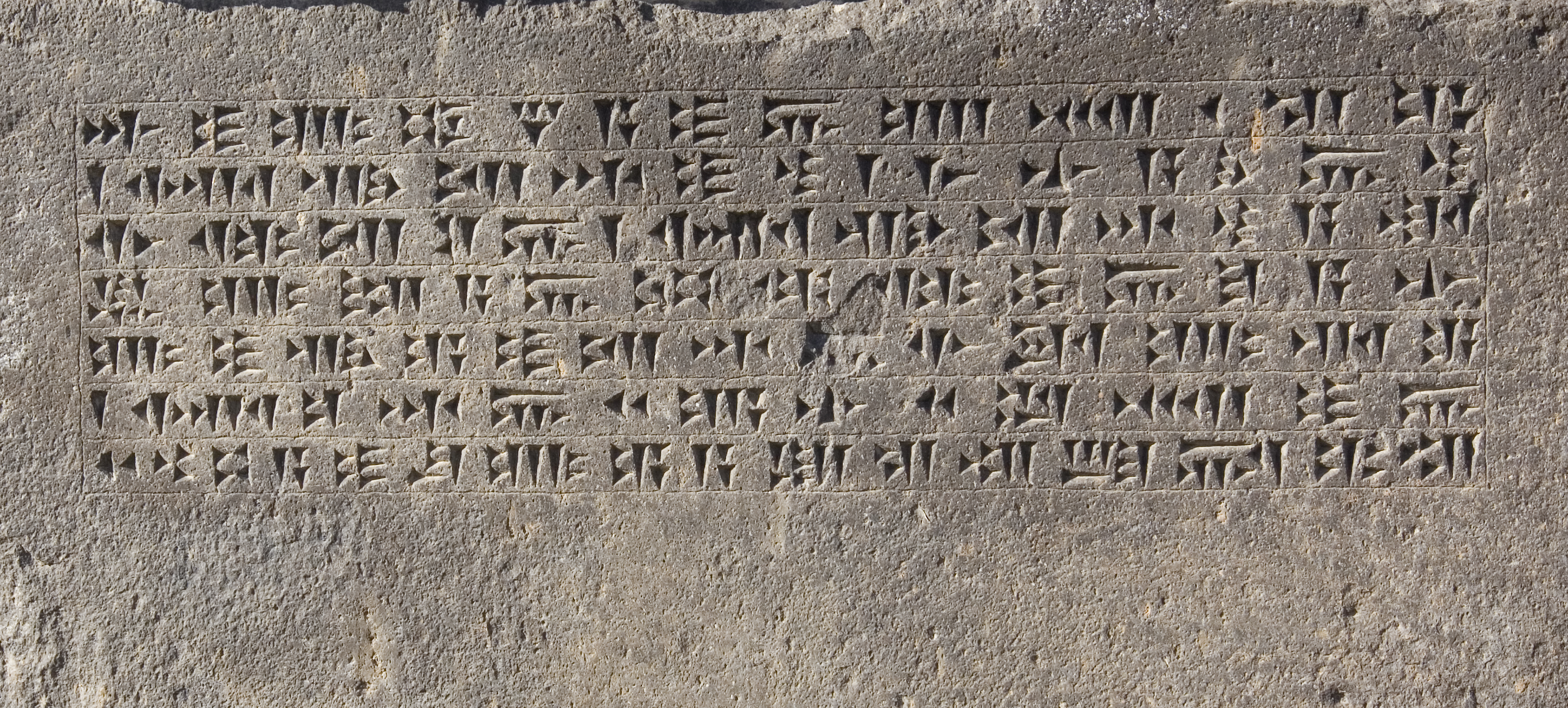
Urartu Cuneiform Argishti

Archaeological research has uncovered Hurrian settlements in the Iğdır region going back to 4000 BC. The area was part of the Urartu kingdom circa 800 BC. There is a Urartu statuary in the area. It remained under Urartian control until its transition to the Median Empire, Persian Empire, Alexander The Great, Orontid dynasty of the Kingdom of Armenia. Seleucid, Parthian, Roman, Sassanid, and Byzantine forces were prominent from the 4th century BC, followed by the Arab armies of Islam in 646. Turks, Georgians and Mongols fought through here for 400 years from 1064 onwards until the area was settled by Kara Koyunlu and then Ak Koyunlu Turkic tribes in the early 15th century.

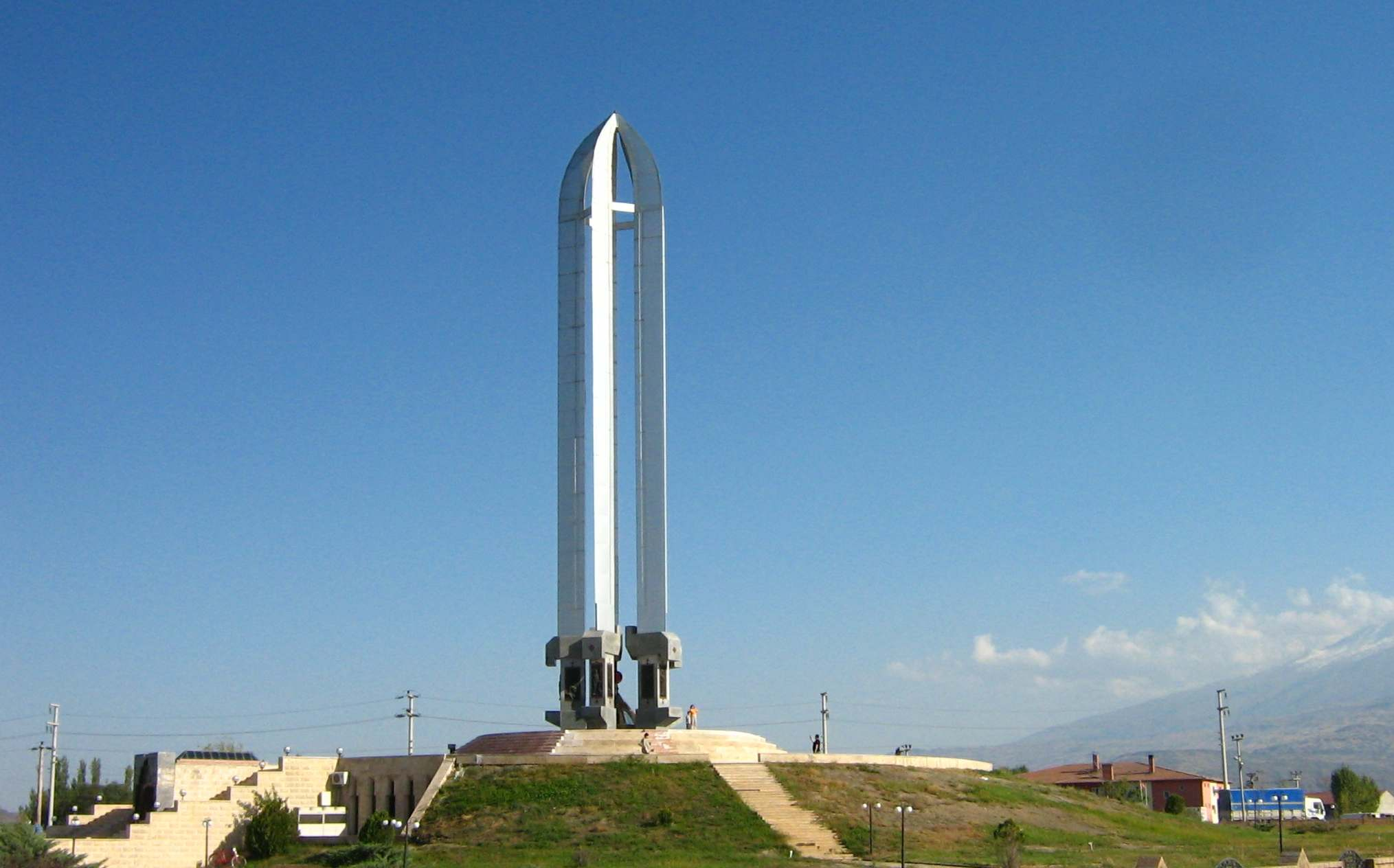
Iğdır Genocide Memorial and Museum

For centuries, constant warfare ensued between the two arch rivals, the Ottoman Empire and the Persian Empire from 1534 until 1746. The region, most of the time remaining in Persian hands, was officially ceded once again in 1746, when it became part of the Erivan khanate, a Muslim principality in Persia. It remained in Persian hands until after the Russo-Persian War, 1826–1828 when it became part of the Russian Empire under the Treaty of Turkmenchay. Under Russian administration, the area became the Surmalu uezd (with its capital at the city of Iğdır) of the Armenian Oblast and later the Erivan Governorate within the Caucasus Viceroyalty.

Towards the end of World War I, the whole area came under the administration of the First Republic of Armenia as part of Ararat province. After an attack into the territory by the Turkish army, Iğdır was ceded to Turkey by the Soviet government under the Treaty of Kars. A substantial Armenian population remained in the area throughout this history of struggle between great powers. Armenians formed the ethnic majority in the city of Iğdır itself until 1919–1920 when most either died or fled due to starvation during the Turkish–Armenian War. It was part of the former Province of Beyazıt between 1922 and 1927, part of Ağrı Province between 1927 and 1934, and finally part of Kars Province between 1934 and 1993, before becoming a separate province.

== Demographics ==
=== Within the Russian Empire ===
==== Estimate of 1886 ====
The area of the present-day Iğdır Province was administered by the Russian Empire as part of the Surmalu Uezd between 1828 and its capture from Persia by the Turkmenchay, and 1918. According to the Russian family lists accounts from 1886, of the total 71,066 inhabitants of the districts 34,351 were Azerbaijanis (48.3%, mentioned as 'Tatars' in the source), 22,096 Armenians (31.1%) and 14,619 Kurds (20.6%).

==== Russian Empire census (1897) ====
According to the Russian Empire census in 1897, the town of Iğdır had a population of 4,680, of which 3,934 (84%) were Armenians, and 559 (12%) were Russians. The district had a population of 89,055 in 1897 of which Tatars (later known as Azerbaijanis) constituted 46.5% of the population, followed by 30.4% Armenians, 21.4% Kurds and 1.6% Slavs. Iğdır city had a population of 4,680 in the same census of which 84.1% were Armenians, 12% Slavic, 1.8% Azerbaijani and 1.5% Kurdish.

==== Caucasian Calendar (1917) ====
According to the 1917 publication of the Caucasian Calendar, the Surmalu Uezd had 104,791 residents in 1916, including 55,364 men and 49,427 women, 98,212 of whom were the permanent population, and 6,579 were temporary residents. The statistics indicated Shia Muslims to be the plurality of the population of the uezd, followed closely by Armenians, Kurds and Yazidis:

Nationality	Number	%
Shia Muslims	44,153	42.13
Armenians	32,686	31.19
Kurds	14,679	14.01
Yazidis	10,869	10.37
Sunni Muslims	1,801	1.72
Russians	429	0.41
Jews	95	0.09
Other Europeans	60	0.06
Asiatic Christians	19	0.02
TOTAL	104,791	100.00

=== Within the Republic of Turkey ===
==== Turkish census of 1927 ====
In the 1927 Turkish census, the district was part of Kars Province and had a population of 25,209, of which 52.9% spoke Turkish as first language followed by Kurdish at 47%. The whole population adhered to Islam, majority being Sunni with a Shia minority.

From comparing the statistics available in 1916 and 1927, it is evident the population of the Iğdir Province lessened by 79,582, a decline of 76% over eleven years, which is indicative of the constant state of warfare, famine and turmoil in the district between 1918 and 1920.

By 2018, the population of the district reached 197,456, nearing double what it was a century prior.

== Places of interest ==
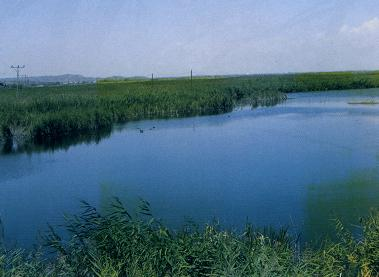
Karasu River from Igdir

- **The caravanserai of Zor**, believed to have been built by an Armenian architect in the 13th or 14th century, is located 35 km south-west of the city of Iğdır, and is named after the nearby village of Zor. It was one of halting places along the trade route between northern Persia and Georgia. Caravans used to stay over-here before passing over the Çilli pass. Restoration works have begun on the structure, which has been put under protection since 1988. The ruins of an Armenian church was once located in the same area, but today nothing remains of it.
- **Surmari castle**, 25 km west of the city of Iğdır, on the road to Tuzluca, in the village of Sürmeli, is the site of the medieval Armenian town of Surmari. However, it is currently inaccessible due to border restrictions.
- **Statues with Ram Heads**, Cementer stones with ram heads existing almost in all old cementers in Iğdır Plain are remnants from Kara Koyunlu period. These cementers of brave, heroic persons and young persons who had died in youth age.
- **Aras Bird Research and Education Center**, One of only four active bird research and banding (ringing) stations in Turkey. 204 bird species have been recorded so far in the wetlands along Aras River, Yukari Ciyrikli, Tuzluca. Bird enthusiasts can volunteer or visit to experience the diverse birdlife and traditional village life. From Kars to Igdir, turn immediately right 10 meter before the Aras bridge and drive 4 km to Yukari Ciyrikli village.

== See also ==
- List of populated places in Iğdır Province
- Ararat Plain
- Caucasus
- South Caucasus
- Battle of Surmalu
