= Armenia–Turkey relations =

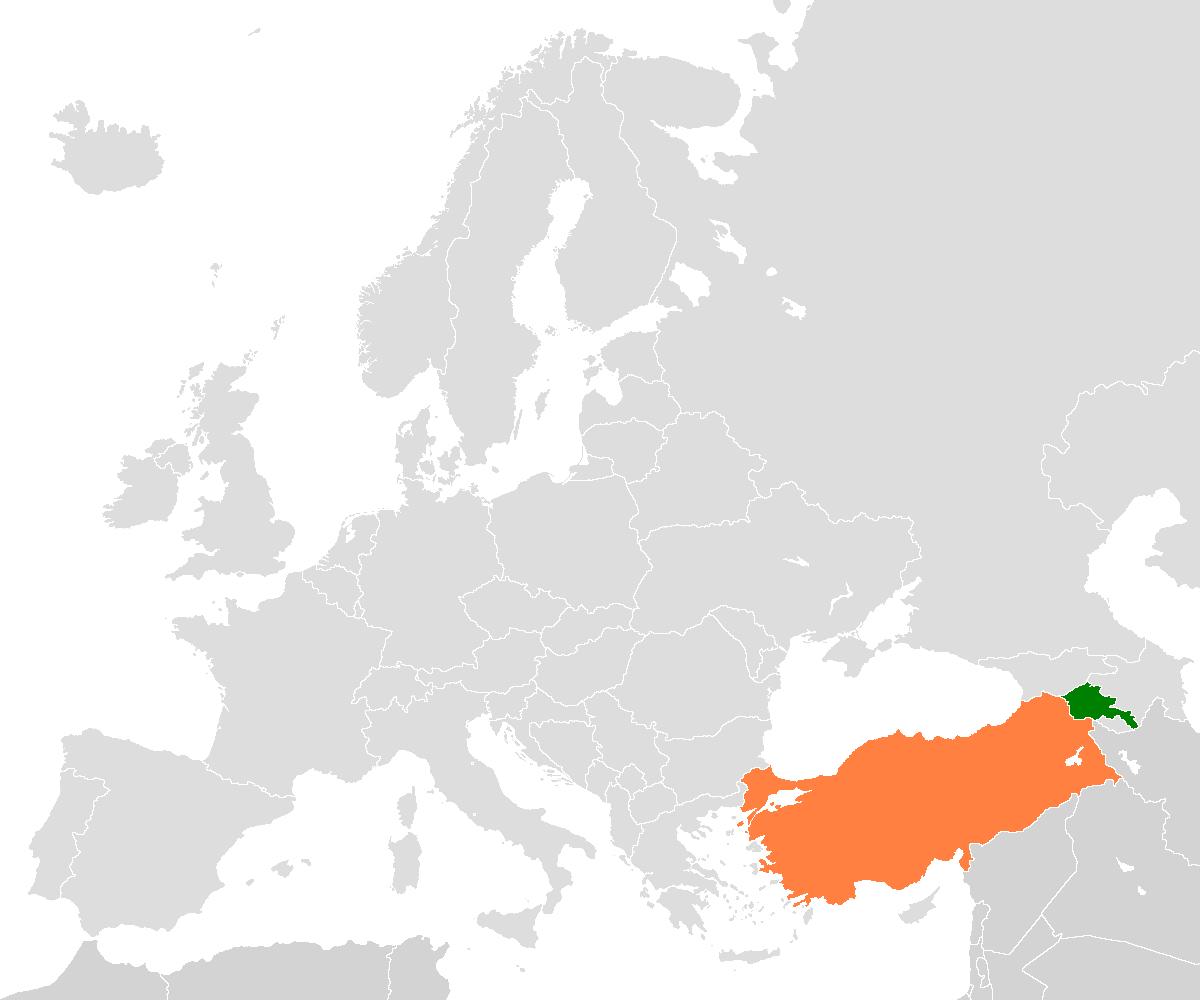

- Armenia: Turkey

Diplomatic relations between Armenia and Turkey are officially non-existent and have historically been hostile. Whilst Turkey recognises the Soviet-Era borders of Eastern Armenia (that map to the modern Republic of Armenia), it has refused to establish diplomatic relations through diplomatic missions or ambassadors. In 1993, Turkey reacted to the war in Nagorno-Karabakh by joining Azerbaijan in imposing a transportation and economic blockade against Armenia which remains enforced to this day.

In 2008–2009, the countries experienced a brief thaw in bilateral relations and in October 2009 the sides signed the normalisation protocols. However, the protocols were never ratified by either side, and the protocols were formally annulled by Armenia in March 2018. Reconciliation in diplomatic relations has been hampered by Turkey's position against Armenia on Nagorno-Karabakh and its official denial of the Armenian genocide.

In December 2021, Armenia and Turkey announced appointing special envoys who met in Moscow in January 2022, with positive international reactions for attempts of normalising relations.

== History ==
In 1071, the Seljuk Turks defeated the Byzantine Empire and captured its emperor at the Battle of Manzikert. In the resulting chaos, the Turks easily overran much of the Byzantine Anatolia. Despite Byzantine reconquests and occasional western incursions in the form of crusading armies, a series of Turkish states were established in Anatolia. These Turkic tribes came around the south end of the Caspian Sea for the most part, and hence absorbed and transmitted Islamic culture and civilization in contrast to other Turks who, such as the Cumans, became partially Westernised and Christianised. With some superiority in population and organisation, regional power naturally came to rest in the hands of the Turkic-speaking population. Many Turkic people came into the region fleeing from the Mongol invasions, and others later came in as soldiers fighting in the ranks of Mongol armies. Turkic Islamised populations also absorbed large numbers of the older inhabitants of Asia Minor, including Greeks and Armenians, who went over to the Islamic religion and Turkic language, creating a frontier society. Armenian communities continued to flourish under relatively tolerant Ottoman rule for centuries, either as minority populations in urban areas or as exclusively Armenian towns in rural areas. In cities such as Istanbul and İzmir, Armenians played particularly important roles; an 1851 report in The New York Times, for instance, indicates that Armenians comprised nearly one quarter of the population of Istanbul at that time, with over 200,000 residents.

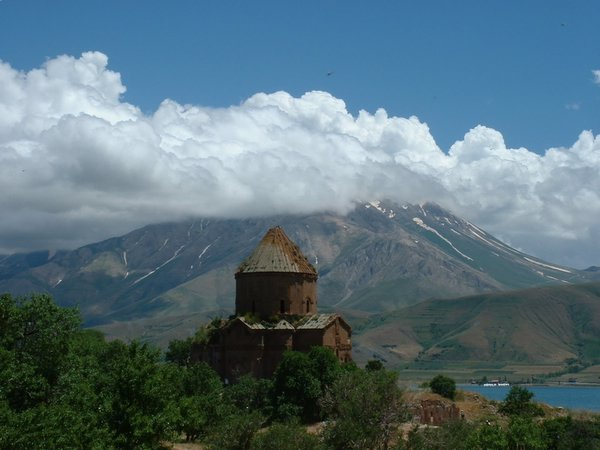
Abandoned since 1915, the tenth-century Armenian Cathedral of the Holy Cross on Akhtamar Island underwent a controversial restoration in 2006, paid for by the Turkish Ministry of Culture.

=== Decline of the Ottoman Empire ===
==== Hamidian rule ====
For a half century leading up to World War I, the Armenian populations of Anatolia became increasingly politically active, and in turn endured increasingly more brutal persecution under Sultan Abdul Hamid II. As the Ottoman Empire declined, its political leadership either authorised or tolerated increasingly violent and reckless attacks on the Armenian population, attracting harsh criticism from various Western nations whose missionary communities in Anatolia witnessed several wide scale massacres of Armenians. From 1894 to 1896 the Sultan ordered the deaths of up to 300,000 Armenians, resulting in at least 50,000 Armenian orphans, in the Hamidian massacres, which were later described by BBC correspondent Chris Morris in The New Turkey (Granta Books, 2005) as "a portent of the grim events of 1915".

The concurrent and accumulated testimony of hundreds and thousands of intelligent people, Christian and Jew, Catholic and Protestant, European and American, made it conclusively certain that a massacre of innocents, unparalleled for ages, had been perpetrated in the Armenian provinces of Turkey. The New York Times January 25, 1896

Following the Hamidian massacres, the seizure of the Ottoman Bank by Armenian revolutionaries later that year, apparently a naïve plea for Western intervention on behalf of the Armenians of the Ottoman Empire, contributed to stoking Hamidian persecution of Armenians. Those who stormed the bank were eventually granted safe passage out of the empire, but the Armenian population found itself subject to intensified violence as the sultan made no distinction between the revolutionaries who had stormed the bank and the Christian populations at large.

The ensuing violence prompted condemnation from several heads of state, including American President Grover Cleveland, who condemned the "bloody butchery" in Anatolia. While it was unclear to what extent the violence against Armenians was governmentally organised, Cleveland's speech noted that "strong evidence exists of actual complicity of Turkish soldiers in the work of destruction and robbery."

In 1909, as the authority of the nascent Young Turk government splintered, Abdul Hamid II briefly regained his sultanate with a populist appeal to Islamism. 30,000 Armenians perished in the subsequent Adana Massacre.

==== The Armenian national movement ====
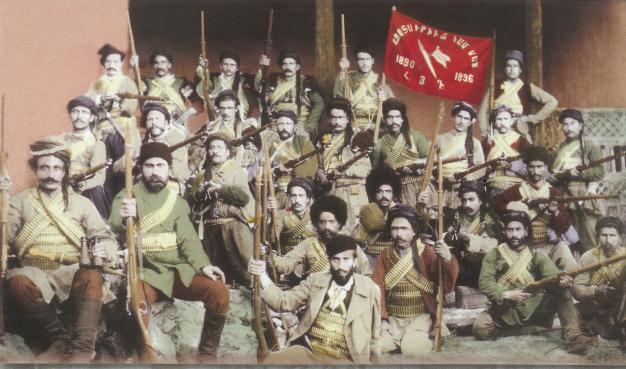
Fedayee group fighting under the ARF banner. Text in Armenian reads "Azadoutioun gam mah" (Liberty or Death).

The Armenian national movement, also known as the "Armenian revolutionary movement", was the Armenian national effort to re-establish an Armenian state in the historic Armenian homelands of eastern Asia Minor and the Transcaucasus (Southern Caucasus). The decline of the Ottoman Empire was in part the result and in part the cause of the rise of nationalism among various groups that made up the multi-ethnic and multi-religion empire. The 1877–1878 Russo-Turkish War, which resulted in the independence of Romania, Serbia and Montenegro, provided a model for other aspiring nationalists and revolutionaries. The Hinchak and Dashnak, Armenian revolutionary committees, were formed following the 1878 Berlin Treaty in the eastern provinces of the Ottoman Empire, which were very much under direct Russian threat. Yet, this is contrasted by Fâ'iz el-Ghusein, who stated, "I have enquired of many Armenians whom I have met, but I have not found one who said that he desired political independence."

Zaven, the Armenian bishop in Istanbul had already declared, before the war started, to the reporter of Msak, the organ of the Armenian nationalist-liberals, that "the radical solution of the Armenian Question would be the unification of all Armenia (including the Eastern Anatolia of Turkey-M.P.) under Russian sovereignty with which Armenians' fate was historically linked. The bishop stated that "the sooner the Russians arrive here, the better for us."

Agitation for improvement of living conditions in the Ottoman Empire among Armenians had started much before the events of World War I, as reported in The New York Times of July 29, 1894:

Two hundred patriotic Armenians, members of the Hentchakiste, or Greek Patriotic Association, organized to liberate Armenia from Turkish rule, marched through the streets of New-York last night with banners and transparencies. The banners were peaceful and quiet, and simply indicated that it was the Armenian Hentchakiste of New-York that was on parade, but the transparencies cried: "Down with the Turkish Government!" and "Hurrah for Armenian Revolution!" ... They consist of patriotic young Armenians who have had to expatriate themselves because the cruel practices of the Turk, and who are trying in this way to bring about the relief which Turkish rulers have promised ever since the Berlin Congress.

In 1894, Zeki Pasha, Commandant of the Fourth Army Corps, was decorated for his participation during the Sassoun massacre. During the massacres, he reportedly stated, "not finding any rebellion we cleared the country so none should occur in the future."

==== The Armenian genocide ====
The Armenian genocide was the forced deportation and extermination of the majority of the Ottoman Armenian population between 1915 and 1917, when between 800,000 and 1,500,000 (per the government of France) Armenians were killed.

According to Rafael de Nogales, Ottoman commander of the artillery at Van Resistance, "the Armenians’ posture was defensive and in response to the massacres being committed in villages surrounding Van". Also, Armenians were being forcibly relocated from Zeitun in March 1915, months before the Tehcir Law was passed. Further massacres and deportations occurred during the closing stages and immediate aftermath of World War I. The modern Turkish government has always denied the fact that the massacres of the Armenians during the Ottoman period constituted genocide, inflaming Armenian resentment in Armenia and around the world. In recent years the Armenian genocide of 1915 has been increasingly discussed in Turkey, at conferences and universities, since the law does not prevent debates on the topic. Even though freedom of speech and freedom of thought are guaranteed by Turkish law due to the nature of Article 301, people claiming an Armenian genocide can be accused of calling the nation "killers" and thus "insulting Turkishness". Over eighty authors have faced prosecution for "insulting Turkishness"; Kemal Kerinçsiz, an ultra-nationalist lawyer, is responsible for at least forty of them, and his group Büyük Hukukçular Birliği ("Great Union of Jurists" or "Turkish Lawyer's Union") for most of the rest. The Turkish educational system continues to mandate teaching of Armenian genocide denial in its public schools.

==== First Republic of Armenia ====
The 1918 Treaty of Brest-Litovsk established three independent states in the Caucasus, including the First Republic of Armenia. Within two months of its signing, the Ottoman Empire reneged on the treaty by invading the nascent Armenian state, until being stopped at the Battle of Sardarabad. The invasion culminated in the Treaty of Batum in June 1918.

=== Interwar and Soviet periods ===
The interwar period was marked by the partitioning of the Ottoman Empire; Anatolia became the Republic of Turkey in 1923. Turkish revolutionaries waged the Turkish War of Independence against Ottoman loyalists and neighboring countries, and engaged in continuing conflict with the Democratic Republic of Armenia.

On September 24, 1920, Turkish forces invaded Armenia, advancing into Sarighamish and Kars. Mustafa Kemal Atatürk sent delegations to Moscow; the DRA would ultimately become the Armenian SSR of the Soviet Union. The Treaty of Kars, identical to the previously concluded Russo-Turkish Treaty of Moscow, was signed on October 23, 1921, between the Grand National Assembly of Turkey and representatives of Bolshevist Russia, Soviet Armenia, Soviet Azerbaijan and Soviet Georgia (all of which formed part of the Soviet Union after the December 1922 Union Treaty).

The Soviet Union and Turkey remained officially neutral after the Treaty of Kars, and there was no hostility between Turkey and the Armenian SSR. The land border was closed except for the Kars–Leninakan railway.

==== Capital tax and Aşkale ====
During World War II, an extremely high tax burden was imposed on Armenian, Greek and Jewish citizens of Turkey, and tax assessors had a free hand in determining the amount, often amounts that could not be paid. In the winter of 1942, hundreds who could not pay, including elderly men, were brought to the town of Aşkale, with very harsh winters, and made to shovel snow continually for as much as five months. Some were able to pay locals to perform the labor for them, and some succumbed to the cold and conditions, sleeping in barns, coffeehouses, or anywhere else they could get shelter. The book "You Rejoice My Heart" by Turkish author Kemal Yalçın includes a visit by the author to Aşkale in the 1990s to learn first hand about the tax and the labor camps, the conditions and the victims at a time when this incident was dangerous and taboo to discuss in Turkey.

==== Istanbul pogrom ====
The September 1955 Istanbul pogrom targeted ethnic minorities in Istanbul, especially Greeks and Armenians.

==== Armenian Secret Army for the Liberation of Armenia ====
ASALA, the Armenian Secret Army for the Liberation of Armenia, was a Marxist–Leninist militant organisation of Lebanese extraction, that operated from 1975 to 1991. In the 1980s it launched a series of assassinations against Turkish diplomats in several countries, with the stated intention to compel the Turkish Government to acknowledge its responsibility for the Armenian genocide, pay reparations, and cede territory. The territorial claim related to the 1920 Treaty of Sèvres and a Woodrow Wilson-era plan for an Armenian homeland.

The group planned attacks worldwide, though it experienced internal splintering after its 1983 Orly Airport attack incurred non-Turkish casualties. The attacks, which were routinely condemned by Armenian church leaders, as well as the international community, were famously protested by an Armenian named Artin Penik in 1982, who self-immolated in Istanbul's Taksim Square to demonstrate the force of his opposition to ASALA tactics. The Armenian Patriarch of Constantinople, who visited the badly burned Penik in the hospital shortly before his death, described him as "a symbol of Armenian discontent with these brutal murders."

A similar organisation, Justice Commandos of the Armenian Genocide, at times known as the Armenian Revolutionary Army, was responsible for at least an additional six killings. In the 1983 Turkish embassy attack in Lisbon, gunmen deliberately "sacrificed" themselves by setting off a bomb in the building, such that none of them survived.

Amidst a spate of attacks in 1985, U.S. President Ronald Reagan asked Congress to defeat a resolution recognising the "genocidal massacre" of Armenians, in part for his fear that it might indirectly "reward terrorism". According to the MIPT website, there had been 84 incidents involving ASALA leaving 46 people dead, and 299 people injured.

== Modern relations ==
=== Armenian independence 1991 ===
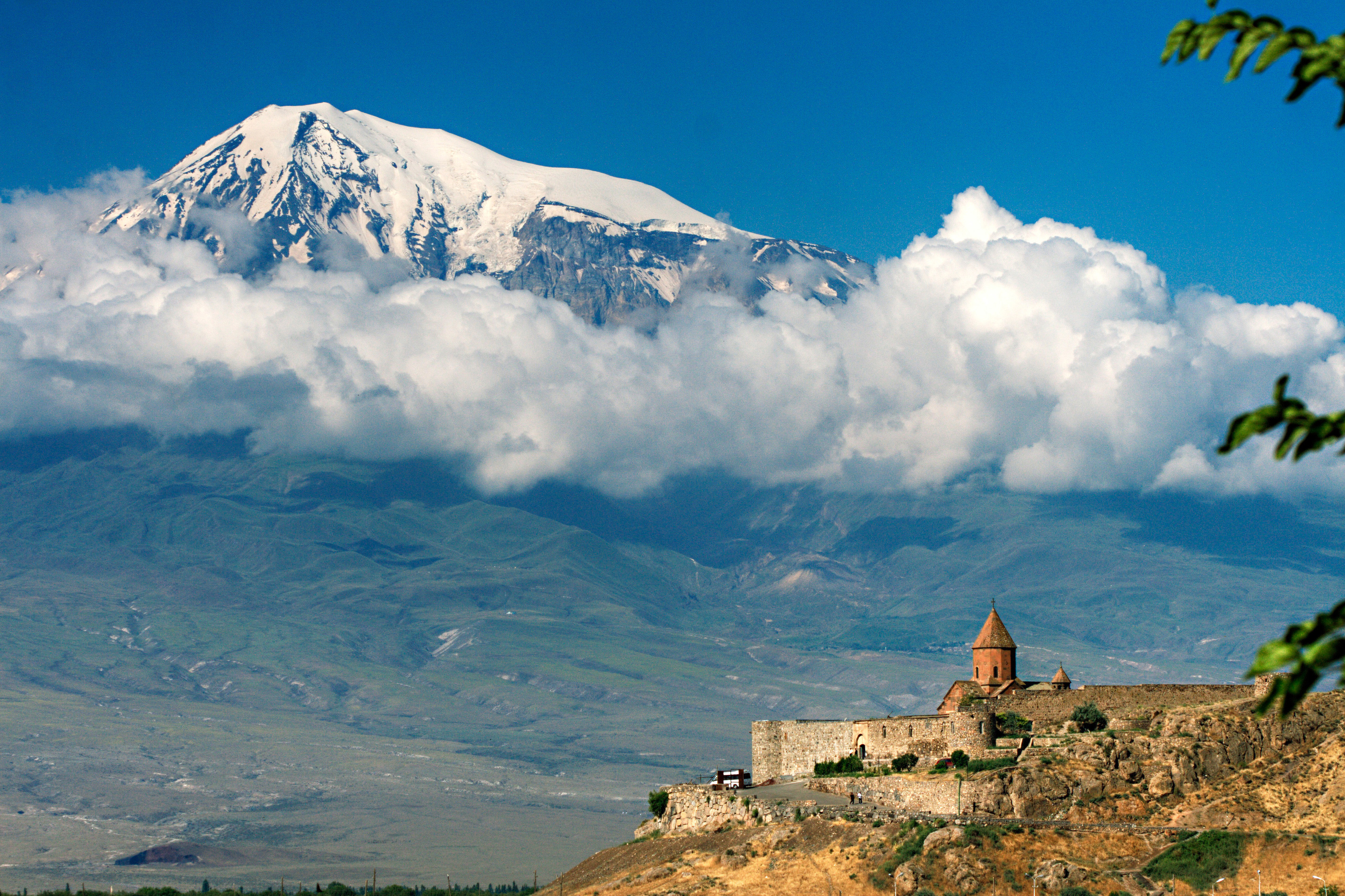
The Khor Virap monastery, which dates to the 7th century, lies on the closed Turkish-Armenian border.

Turkey was one of the first countries to recognise Armenia's independence after the collapse of the Soviet Union in 1991. Ankara, however, refused to establish diplomatic relations with Yerevan, as well as to open the two Turkish-Armenian border gates, such as Alijan – Margaran and Dogukap – Akhurik. Turkey put forward two preconditions: Armenia must recognise the Turkish-Armenian border, which was established under the Treaty of Kars in 1921, that is, waive territorial claims, as well as put an end to the process of international recognition of the Armenian genocide.

=== Diplomatic freeze ===
==== Nagorno-Karabakh War ====
Turkey was an active member of the OSCE Minsk Group created in 1992 by the Conference on Security and Cooperation in Europe to mediate an end to the conflict between Armenia and Turkey's ally Azerbaijan over the disputed autonomous oblast of Nagorno-Karabakh, which had been raging since the oblast's parliament had voted to unify with Armenia on February 20, 1988, but the group made little progress and full-scale fighting quickly re-erupted.

Armenia–Turkey relations gradually worsened as the Armenian military continued to make gains in the Nagorno-Karabakh region, and the May 9, 1992 capture of Shusha by the Armenians resulted in Turkish Prime Minister Suleyman Demirel coming under intense public pressure to intervene. Demirel opposed such intervention, saying that Turkey's entrance into the war would trigger an even greater Muslim–Christian conflict. Turkey did not send troops to aid Azerbaijan, but provided Azerbaijan with military aid and advisors.

Subsequent ethnic cleansing of Nagorno-Karabakh of all of its Azerbaijani population which culminated in the Khojaly Massacre in February 1992 and of the ethnic cleansing of Armenians living in other regions of Azerbaijan, as was the case during the Baku Pogrom, further aggravated relations, which have never really recovered.

==== United Nations Security Council Resolution 822 ====
Turkey cosponsored UN Security Council Resolution 822 affirming Nagorno-Karabakh as part of Azerbaijan's territorial integrity and demanding that Armenian forces withdraw from Kelbajar. Later in 1993 Turkey joined Azerbaijan in imposing an economic embargo on Armenia and the border between the two states was closed.

In mid-August, 1993, Armenians massed a force to take the Azeri regions of Fizuli and Jebrail, south of Nagorno-Karabakh proper and Turkish Prime Minister Tansu Çiller responded by sending thousands of Turkish troops to the border and demanding that Armenia pull out of Azerbaijan's territories. Russian Federation forces in Armenia however countered their movements and thus warded off any possibility that Turkey might play a military role in the conflict.

Memories of the Armenian genocide were re-awoken during the conflict by claims of ethnic cleansing.

==== Ongoing blockade ====
The joint Turkish–Azeri blockade of Armenia is an ongoing transportation and economic embargo against Armenia which has significantly impacted its economy and the regional trade dynamics of the Caucasus. The blockade was initiated in 1989 by Azerbaijan, originally in response to the Karabakh movement which called for independence from Azerbaijan and reunification with Armenia. Turkey later joined the blockade against Armenia in 1993. The blockade aims at isolating Armenia (and Nagorno-Karabakh until 2023) to pressure the Armenian side to make concessions: namely, the resolution of the Nagorno-Karabakh conflict in Azerbaijan’s favor, the cessation of Armenia's pursuit of international recognition of Turkey’s genocide in Western Armenia, the ratification by Armenia of the 1921 borders inherited from the Kemalist-Soviet Treaty of Kars, (Note: Following Turkey's invasion of Armenia in 1920, the Democratic Republic of Armenia signed the Treaty of Alexandropol under duress, effectively accepting Turkish territorial demands. However, the treaty was never ratified by an independent post-Soviet Armenia.) and the establishment of an extraterritorial corridor through Armenian territory.

Armenia claims that Turkey has used the ongoing blockade that resulted from the unresolved Nagorno-Karabakh conflict to isolate the country with projects such as the Baku-Tbilisi-Ceyhan oil pipeline, Baku-Tbilisi-Erzurum natural gas pipeline and the Kars-Tbilisi-Baku railway, all of which directly bypass Armenia despite the economic logic of incorporating Armenia. A rail line from Kars to Baku already existed in fact, but had been closed by Turkey, as it passes through the closed Turkey–Armenia border.

Armenia, which has no coal, natural gas or oil of its own and scant wind and water resources, had long been suffering from severe energy shortages and now blockaded by neighbouring Turkey and Azerbaijan, from whom it used to import nearly all its fuel, was forced to announce that it would restart the second of two VVER reactors in the Metsamor Nuclear Power Plant. Armenian Environmental Committee Chairman Samuel Shahinian explained the decision; "Our people are so cold we cannot explain anything to them, they just want to be warm." The reactors, which had been commissioned by the Soviet authorities in 1979 and had long been considered dangerously out-of-date, were shut down in 1988 over safety concerns following the nearby Spitak earthquake. The announcement prompted uproar in Turkey whose border is just 17 km from Metsamor. "There are certain risks", confirmed Armenian Deputy Speaker Ara Sahakian, "but we should realise and everyone should realise we have no other choice."

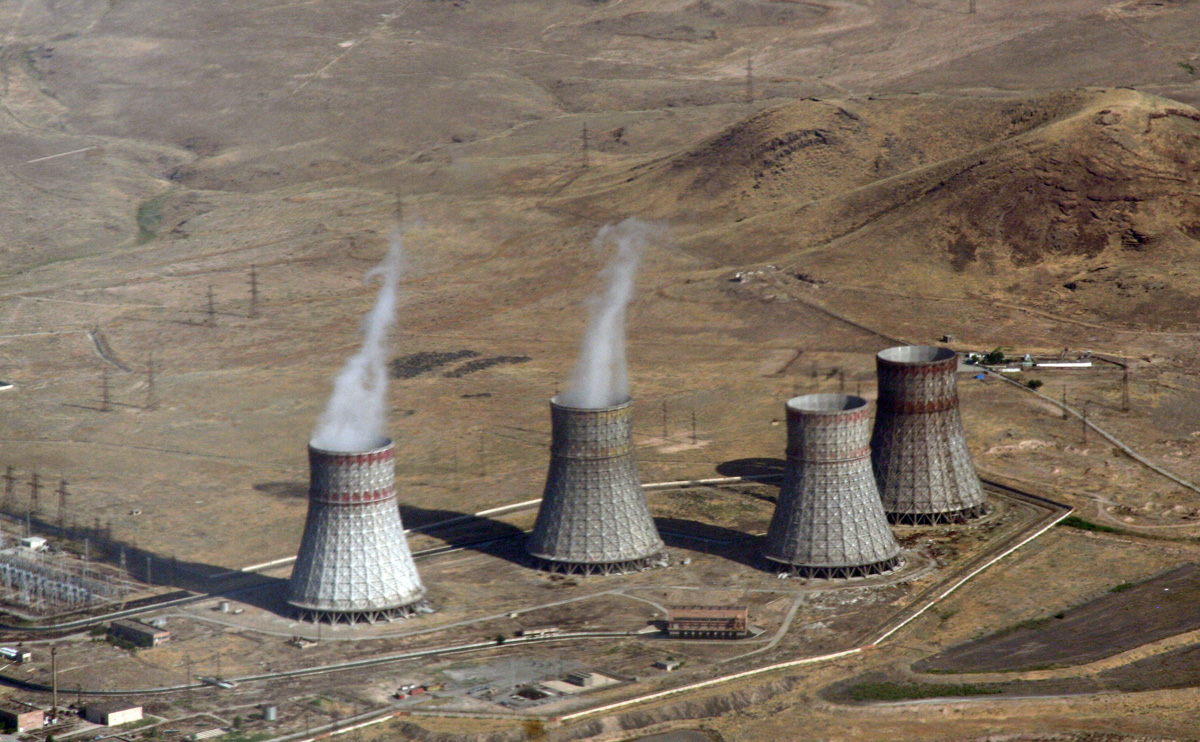
Metsamor Nuclear Power Plant

==== Metsamor re-commissioning ====
Metsamor unit-2 was recommissioned in 1995 after an estimated $50m had been spent on safety improvements but this did little to alleviate safety concerns in Turkey and the Turkish Atomic Energy Agency (TAEK) along with the Turkish Environment and Forestry Ministry, Kafkas University and various institutes and foundations formed a tight infrastructure of control in the region across the border from the reactor and set up the RESAI early warning system to take constant measurements of airborne gamma radiation levels and sample analyses of local soil, plant, and food to give advance warning when levels rise above threshold limits. TAEK Deputy Chairman Dr. Erdener Birol confirms, "As the radiation level increases, Ankara is notified about it immediately."

Further safety concerns arose when it was revealed that the ongoing blockade of the country by its neighbours Turkey and Azerbaijan meant that nuclear fuel for the plant was flown onboard Antonov and Tupolev airplanes from Russia into Yerevan Airport in secret shipments which Alexis Louber, Head of the EU delegation in Yerevan, likened to "flying around a potential nuclear bomb."

==== Elie Wiesel affirmation of the Armenian genocide ====
On June 9, 2000, in a full-page statement in The New York Times, 126 scholars, including Nobel Prize-winner Elie Wiesel, historian Yehuda Bauer, and sociologist Irving Horowitz, signed a document "affirming that the World War I Armenian genocide is an incontestable historical fact and accordingly urge the governments of Western democracies to likewise recognise it as such." According to Stephen Kinzer the reshaping of the national consciousness in the first years of the new century "allowed [the Turks] to open their minds to alternative views of the 1915 tragedy," and, "more than a dozen books touching on this subject were published in Turkey, bearing titles like Armenians in Our Neighbourhood and The Armenian Taboo."

==== ALTAY operation ====
According to the news website Nordic Monitor, Turkey planned military action against Armenia code-named ALTAY. The operation plan was finalised in 2001. Details leaked in 2019, when it was also mentioned that the plan is still valid.

==== Metsamor deadline ====
In 2001 after Armenia became a member of the Council of Europe authorities in Yerevan stated that they expected EU assistance in the construction of a gas pipeline. In 2007 the pipeline was completed; it connects Armenia to neighbouring Iran and thus lifted the Turkish and Azerbaijani blockade. Armenian Deputy Energy Minister Areg Galstyan indicated that the plant, which provides 40 percent of Armenia's energy and sells excess power to neighbouring Georgia, should remain running until 2016 and possibly 2031. Galstyan stated, "It was a big mistake to shut the plant in 1988; it created an energy crisis and the people and the economy suffered. It is impossible for the government to cause the same problem again by closing the plant."

Professor Hayrettin Kilic of Ferrara University speaking at a conference jointly organised by the Kars City Council and Kafkas University responded that, "The risk is tremendous. Metsamor nuclear power plant is not a problem of Kars, Ağrı, Iğdır, Yerevan and Nakhichevan but a problem of Turkey, Georgia and all Armenia. This is a regional problem." Iğdır Mayor Nurettin Aras stated, "We are in danger of a disaster. We will apply for the closing down of the nuclear plant," and Kars Mayor Naif Alibeyoglu confirmed that, "We are doing everything to close this plant, but not everything is in our power. It is essential that state authorities attend to this matter closely," and, "The Turkish government should start an initiative for the closure of the plant. Both Turkish and Armenian people should be aware of the this [sic] danger."

Galstyan dismissed safety concerns stating that it is more important to Armenians "to keep the electricity on," whilst Jeremy Page, writing in The Times pointed out that, "The mostly Christian nation is also reluctant to rely on imported energy because of its history of hostility with its Islamic neighbours."

A final agreement had been achieved with the EU and other involved international organisations to prolong the exploitation of the plant at least until 2016.

==== Turkish-Armenian Reconciliation Commission ====
The Turkish-Armenian Reconciliation Commission was launched on 9 July 2001 in Geneva, Switzerland with ten individuals from Armenia, Turkey, Russia, and the United States mostly consisting of former high-ranking politicians renowned for their past achievements who aimed "to promote mutual understanding and goodwill between Turks and Armenians and to encourage improved relations." Armenian Assembly of America (AAA) Chairman Harair Hovnanian stated, "This is the first multi-disciplinary, comprehensive attempt to reconcile differences between two neighbors, separated by bitterness and mistrust, and as such, it is a major advance", and AAA President Carolyn Mugar added, "We believe that the Turkish-Armenian Reconciliation Commission will benefit and build on the experiences of other similar international efforts."

==== AKP comes to power in Turkey ====
The Justice and Development Party (AKP) came to power in Turkey, following the 2002 Turkish general election, under Recep Tayyip Erdoğan and Abdullah Gül with a foreign policy formulated by Ahmet Davutoğlu that postulated "zero problems with neighbours" leading to new hope for Armenian–Turkish relations.

Restrictions on Armenians entering Turkey had been lifted in January 2002, and although the border between the two countries remained closed, Armenian workers were reportedly entering the country via Georgia and remaining illegally after their 30-day non-resident visa expired. An undeclared official Turkish policy developed to keep the illegal immigrants relatively comfortable with Turkish Prime Minister Erdoğan later announcing, "they could not sustain themselves in their homeland, and we opened our doors. We could deport them but we are not doing so." Gazi University professor Mehmet Seyfettin Erol confirmed that, "This is soft power for Turkey," of the policy credited with improving bilateral relations, "Treating them as ‘others’ does not serve any purpose and it will in all likelihood push Armenians away from Turkey."

The International Center for Transitional Justice was asked by the Turkish-Armenian Reconciliation Commission to provide a report on the applicability of the Genocide Convention to the controversy. This report ruled that the term "genocide" aptly describes "the Ottoman massacre of Armenians in 1915–1918", but added that the modern Republic of Turkey was not legally liable for the event.

==== The issue of Turkey's accession to EU ====
Some European Union politicians pressured Turkey into formally recognising the Armenian genocide as a precondition for joining the EU. This was widely criticised within Turkey.

Among the fiercest critics of this method of pressuring Turkey was the late Hrant Dink, who accused Angela Merkel of sponsoring legislation acknowledging the Armenian genocide to undermine Turkey's EU ambitions. Dink suggested that anyone sincerely interested in the welfare of the Armenian and Turkish peoples would sooner pressure Yerevan to finally replace the Metsamor reactor, or press Turkey to finally open the Armenian–Turkish border, or even just generally "help economically and diplomatically and support the moderates who exist on both sides."

According to former Armenian President Robert Kocharyan, "Armenia has never been against Turkey's accession to the European Union." Armenia itself is a member of the EU's New Neighborhood group, which may one day lead to EU membership.

Former Armenian Foreign Minister Vardan Oskanyan, while conceding that "genocide denial hurts", insists that the Turkish viewpoint does not necessarily "impede the normalization of our relations".

For us, there's no court case, we'll never talk about this, because we grew up with the real evidence, our parents and our grandparents. That living evidence of this tragedy, survival of genocide, I'm the son of one them. So for Armenians there has never been an issue where we ourselves have to prove this by going to court, that this genocide happened. The question for us is to get a political solution. Because the issue is neither historical nor legal, it's political... between the governments of Turkey and Armenia.

As of 2005 Turkey opened its airspace to Armenia in a limited capacity with the resumption of Armavia flights between Yerevan and Istanbul; land trade however continued to be diverted through Georgia.

==== Proposed joint historical commission on events of 1915 ====
In 2005 a group of Turkish scholars and opinion makers held an academic conference at which, it was vowed, all points of view about the Armenian massacre would be respectfully heard. According to Stephen Kinzer, "Some commentators objected to parts of what was said at the conference, but nearly all welcomed the breakthrough to open debate on this painful subject." The International Association of Genocide Scholars, referred to as amateurs by Guenter Lewy, affirmed that scholarly evidence revealed the "Young Turk government of the Ottoman Empire began a systematic genocide of its Armenian citizens – an unarmed Christian minority population. More than a million Armenians were exterminated through direct killing, starvation, torture, and forced death marches" and condemned Turkish attempts to deny its factual and moral reality.

The idea of the establishment of a joint commission composed of historians from Turkey and Armenia, which would examine both countries′ national archives, including "the archives of related countries" and disclose the findings of their research to the international public was approved by the Turkish Grand National Assembly and a letter was sent from the then prime minister Recep Tayyip Erdogan to the Armenian president.

However, the Armenian president's letter as of April 2005 to prime minister Recep Tayyip Erdoğan rejected the offer for the joint commission saying,

It is the responsibility of governments to develop bilateral relations and we do not have the right to delegate that responsibility to historians. That is why we have proposed and propose again that, without pre-conditions, we establish normal relations between our two countries.

In 2006, after years of campaigning by French citizens of Armenian descent, the French National Assembly, in what Stephen Kinzer calls "an astonishing victory" officially declared that Ottoman Turks committed genocide in 1915, and voted it a crime for anyone to assert otherwise.

In February 2007, Armenia's president Robert Kocharian while on a visit to France said that the "normalisation of bilateral relations is the responsibility of governments, not historians."

In April 2015, Armenia's president Serzh Sargsyan said "It becomes obvious that the Turkish proposal of establishing the so-called commission of historians has only one goal, which is to delay the process of the Armenian genocide recognition, and divert the attention of international community from that crime. That is not only our view but also the view of the international community that goes on recognising and condemning the Armenian Genocide."

=== Post-2007 diplomatic thaw ===
==== Hrant Dink assassination ====
The January 2007 assassination of Hrant Dink, a Turkish citizen of Armenian descent, brought the issue of Armenian–Turkish relations into the national consciousness of modern Turkish citizens. Dink was instrumental in getting Turks to discuss the Armenian genocide, an effort for which he found himself the target of criminal prosecution on three separate occasions. Nonetheless, Dink also reserved some criticism for the Armenian diaspora, for its insistence on enforcing a claim of genocide without engaging the modern Turkish people.

Shortly after the arrest of Ogün Samast, the 17-year-old nationalist suspected in the murder, pictures surfaced of the assassin flanked by smiling Turkish police and gendarmerie, who were posing with the killer in front of the Turkish flag while he was in police custody. The pictures triggered a spate of investigations and the removal from office of those involved.

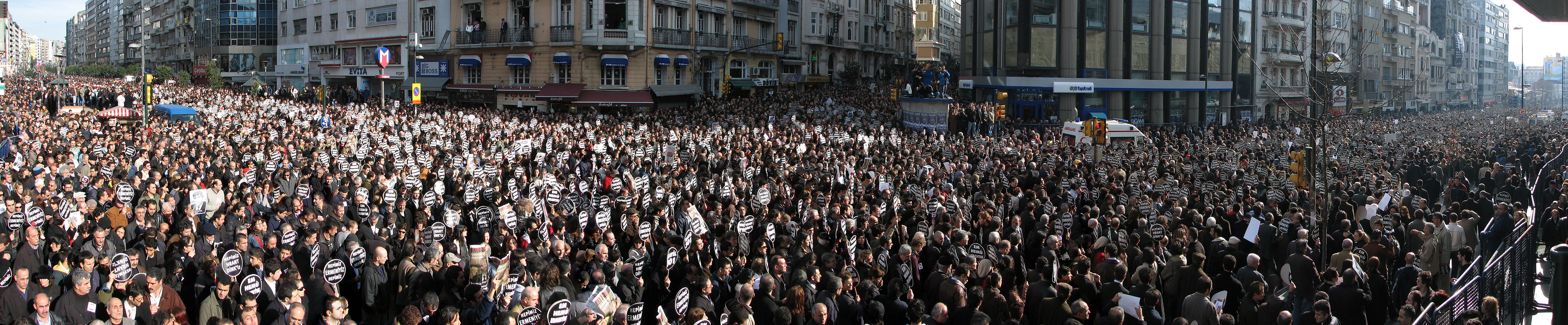
In Turkey, a hundred thousand mourners marched in protest of the January 2007 assassination of Armenian intellectual Hrant Dink by a nationalist radical. The office of the Agos newspaper, where Dink was gunned down, is near the right edge of the image; it is the first building to the right of the one with the large black banner.

At Hrant Dink's funeral, tens of thousands of Turkish citizens marched in solidarity with Dink, many bearing placards reading "We are all Hrant Dink, we are all Armenians" sounding a hopeful note in the development of Armenian–Turkish relations.

==== Nobel Laureate genocide re-affirmation ====
In 2007, the Elie Wiesel Foundation for Humanity produced a letter signed by 53 Nobel Laureates re-affirming the Genocide Scholars' conclusion that the 1915 killings of Armenians constituted genocide. Then Turkish Foreign Minister, Abdullah Gül, responded by reaffirming calls for a committee of Turkish and Armenian historians to re-examine the events of 1915, as first suggested in 2005, but Armenians showed no interest in the suggestion with a 2007 public opinion survey quoted by Stephen Kinzer indicating that, "only 3 percent of Armenians believe that forcing Turkey to admit genocide should be their government's top priority," and, "Only 4 percent even placed it on their list of priorities."

Efforts by Americans of Armenian descent to have the US Congress pass a resolution recognising the Armenian Genocide, however, continued through what Stephen Kinzer calls "their superbly effective lobby in Washington" and "almost passed the House of Representatives in 2007, thanks to the influence of Speaker of the House Nancy Pelosi, in whose home state of California many prosperous Armenian-Americans live," until Condoleezza Rice and Robert M. Gates signed an open letter to Congress, warning that formally recognizing the Armenian genocide "could harm American troops in the field" by "antagonizing" Turkey.

==== Metsamor replacement ====
On September 7, 2007, Armenian Energy Minister Armen Movsisyan announced that Metsamor unit-2 was to be replaced with a new nuclear power plant built on the same site at a cost of $2 billion. "The project's feasibility study is being carried out by Armenia, Russia, the US and the International Atomic Energy Agency. The old nuclear power plant is to be rebuilt within four-and-a-half years", he stated, clarifying that "many foreign countries now understand that Armenia must have a nuclear power plant." TAEK, which had recently denied claims in Today's Zaman that its latest protest to the IAEA was made in response to the RESAI early warning system indicating "an increase in radioactive leakage in the region," stating, "None of the radioactivity analyses or RESAI station measurements done up until now have uncovered radioactivity or radiation levels above normal," confirmed that it would be involved in following related developments and taking the necessary precautions from the Turkish side.

==== 2008 Armenian Genocide Remembrance Day ====
On April 24, 2008, during Armenia's annual Genocide Remembrance Day, a Turkish flag was stomped on during an official demonstration in Yerevan. The Turkish Foreign Ministry reacted by issuing the statement: "With the meaning that it carries, the Turkish flag symbolises freedom and all the fundamental values and beliefs of the Turkish nation. The flag is accepted as synonymous with our nation's existence. The importance attributed by the Turkish nation to these values and its flag is widely known. In this regard, the related news reports led to great sadness, upset and indignation in our society."

==== 2008–2009 Georgia–Russia crisis ====
Following the 2008 South Ossetia war, which prompted concerns over stability of energy routes in the Caucasus, normalisation of ties with Armenia became a priority for the Turkish government.

=== Attempted rapprochement ===
==== "Football diplomacy": Turkish Presidential visit to Armenia and subsequent negotiations ====
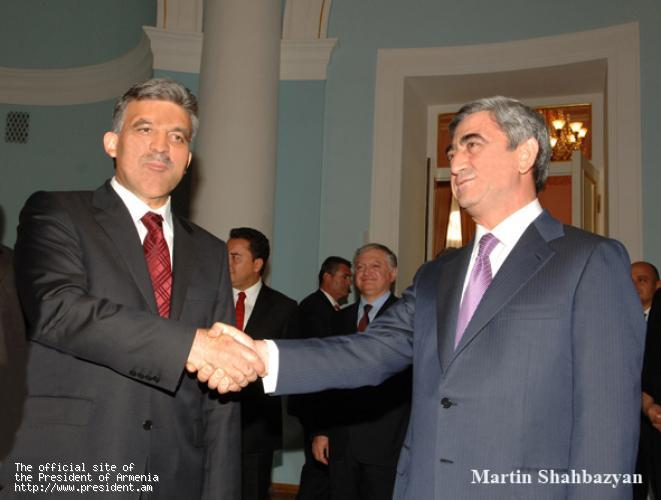
Armenian President Serzh Sargsyan meets with Turkish President Abdullah Gül in Yerevan, 6 September 2008

In September 2008, in what is termed as the "football diplomacy," Turkish President Abdullah Gül became the first Turkish head of state to visit Armenia after he accepted the invitation of Armenian President Serzh Sargsyan to attend a FIFA World Cup qualifier football match between the Turkish and Armenian national football teams at the Hrazdan Stadium in Yerevan. Armenian authorities waived normal visas controls for the visiting Turkish fans in a goodwill gesture. Amid fears of clashes between fans, Turkey's coach, Fatih Terim, called for calm, saying: "This is only a football game not a war. We cannot carry the weight of history on our shoulders. "Talks during the game focused on bilateral relations and Karabakh, and did not touch upon the Armenian Genocide, though Foreign Minister Ali Babacan raised the issue soon afterward. Both of the presidents and their countries’ respective press reflected positively on the visit setting the ground for a thaw in diplomatic relations that was expected to have made great progress in time for Sargsyan's reciprocal visit to Turkey in October to watch the return match. Armenian President Serzh Sarkisian and Turkish President Abdullah Gul both attended the match held in Bursa.

On the eve of the 2009 US presidential visit to Turkey by Barack Obama sources in Ankara and Yerevan announced that a deal might soon be struck to reopen the border between the two states and exchange diplomatic personnel. A research conducted on the Armenia-Turkey border reopening has shown that closed borders between Armenia and its neighboring countries have a negative impact on the Armenian economy. It is not argued that a re-opening of the borders (especially with Turkey) will bring many benefits to the Armenian economy.

Armenian Foreign Minister Eduard Nalbandyan confirmed, "Turkey and Armenia have gone a long way toward opening the Turkey-Armenia border, and they will come closer to opening it soon," but dismissed any connection to the Nagorno-Karabakh dispute. The International Crisis Group (ICG) issued a report on the normalisation stating, "The politicized debate whether to recognize as genocide the destruction of much of the Ottoman Armenian population and the stalemated Armenia-Azerbaijan conflict over Nagorno-Karabakh should not halt momentum." Stating that whilst, "The unresolved Armenia-Azerbaijan conflict over Nagorno-Karabakh still risks undermining full adoption and implementation of the potential package deal between Turkey and Armenia", the, "Bilateral détente with Armenia ultimately could help Baku recover territory better than the current stalemate."

==== Announcement of provisional roadmap and reactions ====
On 22 April 2009, it was announced that high-level diplomatic talks underway in Switzerland since 2007 "had achieved tangible progress and mutual understanding," and that "a road map has been identified," for normalising diplomatic relations between the two countries, although no formal text had yet been signed. Today's Zaman concluded that the cautious approach by Turkish authorities was intended to minimise criticism from Azerbaijan and nationalist Turks who would complain of "submission to Western pressure" but went on to quote an unnamed Western diplomat who speaking to Reuters confirmed that, "All the documents have been agreed in principle," and that, "We are talking about weeks or months."

The Armenian Dashnak Party responded to the announcement in an April 26 closed-door meeting with a decision to withdraw its 16 deputies, who held three ministries in the Armenian Cabinet, from the coalition government. Reaction to the announcement within Turkey was more muted with opposition MHP leader Bahçeli complaining that, "Armenia knows what is going on; Switzerland knows what is going on; Turkish officials involved in the process know. That means the Turkish nation and Parliament are the only ones who have no information about the process," before going on to conclude that, "It would be beneficial if the prime minister or the minister for foreign affairs would inform Parliament. We will follow developments, but for the moment we don't know the depth of the agreement. Taking the explanations made so far into account, we are monitoring whether any further steps are being taken in the issue of opening the border."

International reaction to the announcement was positive, despite concerns that adverse reaction from Azerbaijan could affect European energy security.

==== United States statements on Armenian Remembrance Day ====
The 2009 statement by U.S. President Barack Obama on Armenian Remembrance Day claimed that, "reckoning with the past holds out a powerful promise of reconciliation," before going on to state that, "the best way to advance that goal right now is for the Armenian and Turkish people to address the facts of the past as part of their effort to move forward," and reaffirming his strong support for "efforts by the Turkish and Armenian people to work through this painful history in a way that is honest open and constructive," but although, as previously indicated, U.S. President Obama did not use the word ‘genocide’ his use of the Armenian term Meds Yeghern, translated as "Great Crime" or "Calamity", managed to offend both sides of the dispute. Armenian groups felt betrayed at the reversal of promises of recognition made during the 2008 U.S. Presidential election whist Turkish authorities felt that Obama had gone back on promises made during the recent 2009 US presidential visit to Turkey. Despite not saying the word genocide, Obama made it clear that he had not changed his views about the Armenian genocide in the statement, saying "I have consistently stated my own view of what occurred in 1915, and my view of that history has not changed."

Turkish prime minister Recep Tayyip Erdoğan said, "Turkey is not a country that can be flattered and then fooled," before going on to conclude that, "Turkish-Armenian relations will be normalised, historical matters will be enlightened and the road will be paved for peace if countries that have nothing to do with the issue stop getting involved." Turkish opposition leaders were equally critical with MHP leader Bahçeli stating, "Looking at the entire statement, one will see that it is unacceptable," and, "If the U.S. sacrifices Turkey for the sake of Armenian votes, everyone, including most notably Armenia, will have to suffer the consequences," and CHP leader Baykal clarifying that, "Obama's statement shows that efforts to please outsiders by giving concessions are not yielding any result, and we have managed to alienate Azerbaijan, too."

==== 2009 Turkish Presidential visit to Azerbaijan and Russia ====
Armenian authorities responded to comments made by Turkish Prime Minister Erdoğan during his official visit to Baku that, "There is a relation of cause and effect here. The occupation of Nagorno-Karabakh is the cause, and the closure of the border is the effect. Without the occupation ending, the gates will not be opened," with a statement from the office of Armenian President Sarksyan that read, "The president said that, as he repeatedly pointed out during Armenian-Turkish contacts, any Turkish attempt to interfere in the settlement of the Nagorno-Karabakh problem can only harm that process." Armenian Foreign Minister Nalbandian reiterated that, "Concerning the Armenian-Turkish normalisation process, over the past year, following the initiative of the Armenian President together with our Turkish neighbours and with the help of our Swiss partners, we have advanced toward opening one of the last closed borders in Europe and the normalisation of our relations without preconditions. The ball is on the Turkish side now. And we hope that they will find the wisdom and the courage to make the last decisive step. We wish to be confident that the necessary political will can eventually leave behind the mentality of the past."

Erdoğan flew on from Baku to Sochi, Russia, for a 16 May "working visit" with Russian Prime Minister Vladimir Putin at which he stated, "Turkey and Russia have responsibilities in the region. We have to take steps for the peace and well-being of the region. This includes the Nagorno-Karabakh problem, the Middle East dispute, the Cyprus problem." Putin responded that, "Russia and Turkey seek for such problems to be resolved and will facilitate this in every way," but, "As for difficult problems from the past–and the Karabakh problem is among such issues-a compromise should be found by the participants in the conflict. Other states which help reach a compromise in this aspect can play a role of mediators and guarantors to implement the signed agreements."

==== 2009 signing of accord ====
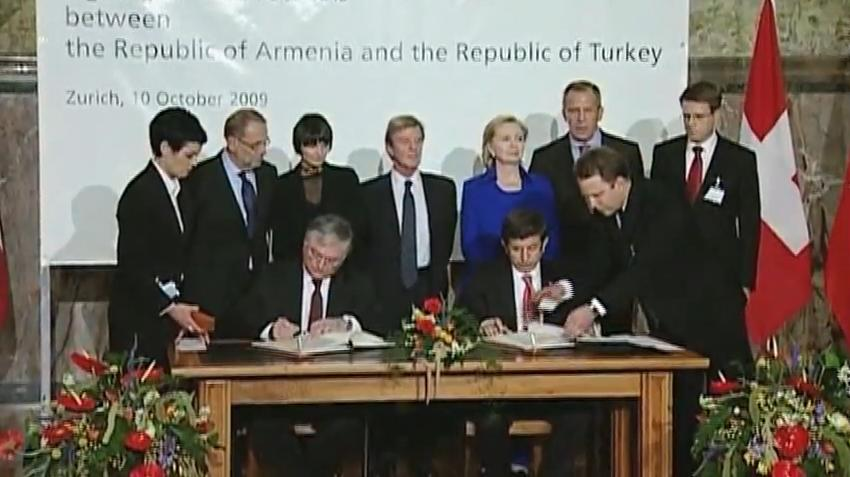
Nalbandyan and Davutoglu signing the accord

The famous "football diplomacy" paved the way for the signing of the 2009 Zurich Protocols, aimed at improving diplomatic relations. An accord between Armenia and Turkey was signed by the foreign ministers of the two countries, Ahmet Davutoğlu and Eduard Nalbandyan, on 10 October 2009. The signing took place in Zürich, Switzerland. Armenians worldwide had protested against the deal because of the controversial concessions that the Armenian leadership was preparing to make, most notably in regards to the Armenian genocide and the Turkish-Armenian border. The deal followed more than one year of talks. It was designed to allow the opening of borders and to set up a formal diplomatic relationship. The signing was attended by Bernard Kouchner, Sergey Lavrov and Hillary Clinton, the foreign ministers of France, Russia and the United States, respectively.

==== Suspension of the ratification process ====
Those diplomatic efforts to normalise the relations initiated by Armenia eventually faltered.

In Armenia, before sending the protocols to the parliament, it was sent to the Constitutional Court to have their constitutionality to be approved. The Constitutional Court made references to the preamble of the protocols underlying three main issues. One of them stated that the implementation of the protocols did not imply Armenia's official recognition of the existing Turkish-Armenian border established by the Treaty of Kars. By doing so, the Constitutional Court rejected one of the main premises of the protocols, i.e. “the mutual recognition of the existing border between the two countries as defined by relevant treaties of international law". This was regarded by the Turkish Government as effectively revising the protocols and thus the reason to back down from the process.

The ruling Armenian coalition decided to propose a suspension of the ratification process to the president after the Turkish Prime Minister Erdogan announced multiple times that the Turkish ratification depended on a peace deal in Nagorno-Karabakh conflict. On the same day President Sargsyan suspended the ratification process although announcing, that Armenia does not suspend the process of normalisation of relationships with Turkey as a whole.

=== Events after the failed thaw ===
==== Possible territorial claims by Armenia ====
On July 5, 2013, during a forum of Armenian lawyers in Yerevan on the 100th Anniversary of the Armenian genocide organised by the Ministry of Diaspora, Armenia's Prosecutor General Aghvan Hovsepyan made a "sensational statement". Hovsepyan stated:

Indeed, the Republic of Armenia should have its lost territories returned and the victims of the Armenian genocide should receive material compensation. But all these claims must have perfect legal grounds. I strongly believe that the descendants of the genocide must receive material compensation, churches miraculously preserved in Turkey’s territory and church lands must be returned to the Armenian Church, and the Republic of Armenia must get back its lost lands.

According to ArmeniaNow news agency "this was seen as the first territorial claim of Armenia to Turkey made on an official level. The prosecutor general is the carrier of the highest legal authority in the country, and his statement is equivalent to an official statement."

In response, the Turkish Ministry of Foreign Affairs released a statement on July 12, 2013:

Such a declaration made by an official occupying a position as important as that of Prosecutor General reflects the prevailing problematic mentality in Armenia as to the territorial integrity of its neighbor Turkey and to Turkish-Armenian relations and also contradicts the obligations it has undertaken towards the international organizations of which it is a member, particularly the UN and the OSCE. One should be well aware that no one can presume to claim land from Turkey.

During his visit to Baku on July 17, 2013, Turkish Foreign Affairs Minister Ahmed Davutoglu described Armenian land claims as "product of delirium."

==== Since 2015 ====
The signing, on 23 December 2015, by Russian defence minister Sergey Shoygu and his Armenian counterpart Seyran Ohanyan of an agreement to form a Joint Air Defense System in the Caucasus that followed the Armenian minister's statement that the ceasefire with Azerbaijan over the breakaway region of Nagorno-Karabakh virtually no longer existed, provoked concern on the part of Turkey's government.

On 1 March 2018, Armenian President Serzh Sargsyan canceled the Armenia-Turkey normalization protocols.

The Armenian Ministry of Foreign Affairs published a statement which condemned the 2019 Turkish offensive into north-eastern Syria, "which would lead to deterioration of regional security, losses among civilians, mass displacement and eventually to a new humanitarian crisis."

==== 2021–2025 normalization process ====
In December 2021, Armenia and Turkey appointed special envoys to discuss steps for normalization of their relations: former U.S. ambassador Serdar Kılıç is Turkey's representative for Armenia, and vice president of Armenian Parliament Ruben Rubinyan is Armenia's representative for Turkey. They first met in Moscow on 14 January 2022. Their second meeting happened in Vienna on 24 February 2022, Their third meeting was met in Vienna on 3 May 2022, Their fourth meeting was met in Vienna on 1 July 2022, The 5th meeting was held on 30 July 2024, on the Armenia–Turkey border. with positive reactions from European Commission spokesman Peter Stano, NATO Secretary General's Special Representative for the Caucasus and Central Asia, Javier Colomina, Turkish pro-government newspapers, and senior fellow of Carnegie Europe Thomas de Waal. Azerbaijani Deputy Minister of Foreign Affairs Khalaf Khalafov also welcomed the start of the normalisation process. On 12 March 2022, Turkish Foreign Minister Mevlüt Çavuşoğlu met with his Armenian counterpart Ararat Mirzoyan for "useful and constructive" talks in an effort to restore ties after decades of hostility. The two met at the Antalya Diplomacy Forum. On 11 July 2022, Prime Minister Pashinyan had a telephone conversation with the Turkish President Recep Tayyip Erdogan for the first time.

After having imposed a ban on Turkish products in response to Turkish participation in the 2020 Karabakh war, on 1 January 2022, Armenia lifted that embargo on Turkey following the start of talks with Turkey.

On 6 October 2022, Armenian prime minister Nikol Pashinyan and Turkish president Recep Tayyip Erdoğan met face-to-face for the first time in Prague during the European Political Community meeting. In February 2023, Pashinyan called Erdoğan to express condolences regarding the 2023 Turkey–Syria earthquake and said that Armenia is ready to help Turkey. A border crossing was opened to allow the passage of humanitarian aid from Armenia to Turkey. On 15 February 2023 Armenian Foreign Minister Ararat Mirzoyan met with his Turkish counterpart Mevlüt Çavuşoğlu in Ankara, and reiterated Armenia's readiness to aid in the disaster relief efforts.

On 25 March 2023, the Armenian and Turkish national football teams had a match in Vazgen Sargsyan Republican Stadium in Yerevan for the UEFA Euro 2024 qualifiers which led to comparisons with the "football diplomacy" of 2008 and 2009.

On 3 June 2023, Armenian Prime Minister Pashinyan visited Ankara to attend the third inauguration of Recep Tayyip Erdoğan, the first visit by an Armenian leader in a decade. Armenian Prime Minister Nikol Pashinyan met with Turkish President Recep Tayyip Erdoğan in Istanbul on 20 June 2025.

== Outstanding issues ==
=== Armenian genocide denial ===
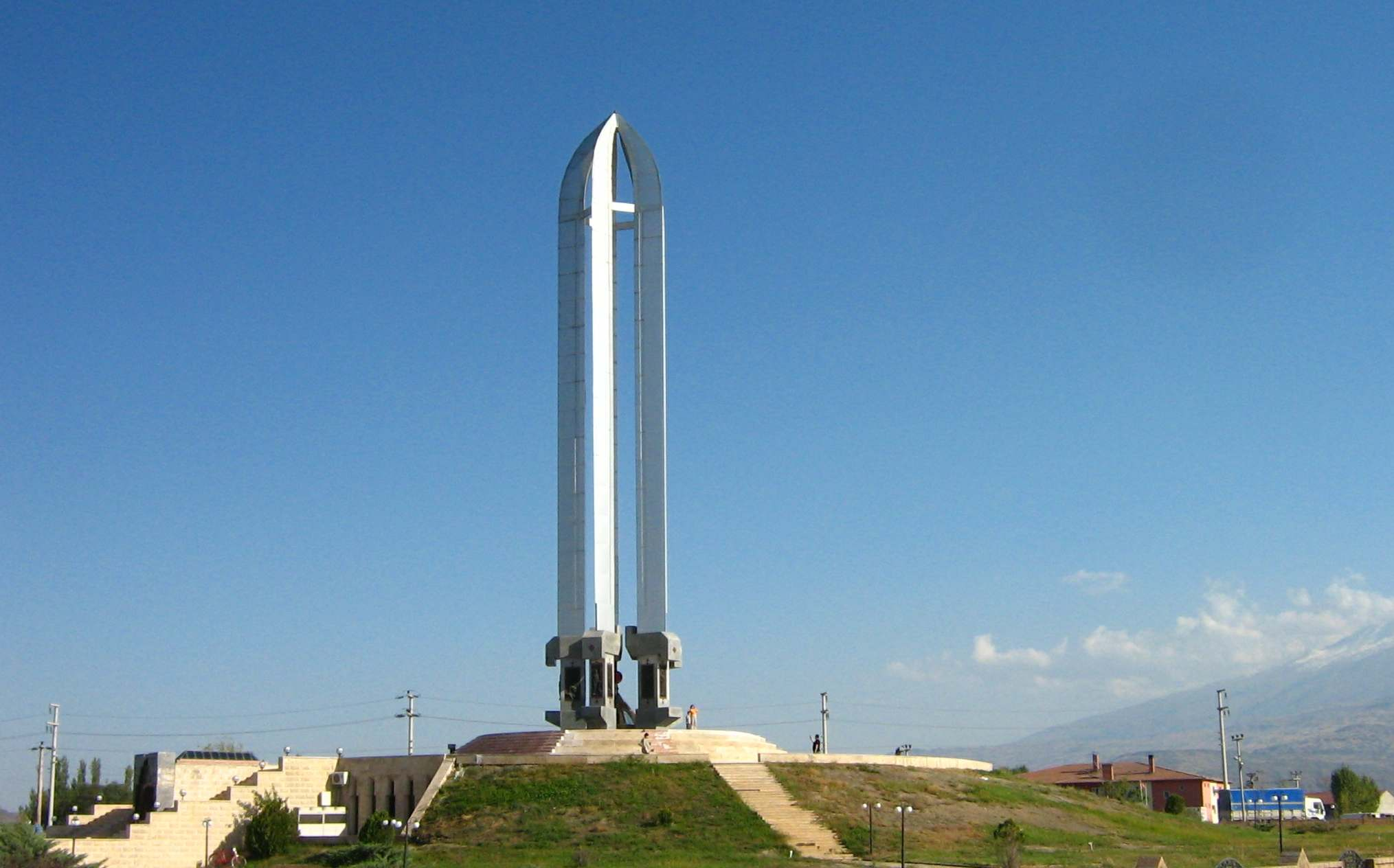
The Iğdır Genocide Memorial and Museum promotes the false view that Armenians committed genocide against Turks, rather than vice versa.

Tensions stemming from the Armenian genocide, the mass murder of around 1 to 1.5 million Armenians by the authorities of the Ottoman Empire during the First World War, are a bitter point of contention, with most historians defining the killings as a genocide, a term whose applicability the Turkish state rejects.

Most historians maintain that it was a deliberate and intentional attempt to exterminate the Armenian population of the Ottoman Empire. This view is also the position of the Republic of Armenia.

The Republic of Turkey rejects the 1.5 million figure for the final death toll, insisting that the deaths were closer to the range of 200,000–300,000, and insists that they were the result of disease, famine and inter-ethnic strife during the turmoil of World War I, saying that the Armenian Dashnak and Henchak rebels had sided with the Russian Army which invaded eastern Anatolia during the war and committed massacres against the local Muslim population (Turks and Kurds) in that area.

Merely to speak of the Armenian genocide in Turkey is to risk "insulting Turkishness", a criminal offence for which various Turkish intelligentsia have been brought to trial, as mentioning the word genocide itself infers its occurrence.

In response to Turkey's calls for a further impartial study, Israel Charny and the International Association of Genocide Scholars responded in an open letter to the Turkish prime minister,

We represent the major body of scholars who study genocide in North America and Europe. We are concerned that in calling for an impartial study of the Armenian genocide you may not be fully aware of the extent of the scholarly and intellectual record on the Armenian genocide and how this event conforms to the definition of the United Nations Genocide Convention. We want to underscore that it is not just Armenians who are affirming the Armenian genocide but it is the overwhelming opinion of scholars who study genocide: hundreds of independent scholars, who have no affiliations with governments, and whose work spans many countries and nationalities and the course of decades.

Numerous international organisations have conducted studies of the events, each in turn determining that the term "genocide" aptly describes "the Ottoman massacre of Armenians in 1915–1918." Among the organizations asserting this conclusion are the International Center for Transitional Justice, the International Association of Genocide Scholars, and the United Nations' Sub-Commission on Prevention of Discrimination and Protection of Minorities.

Several nations have passed formal legislative condemnations of the Armenian genocide, despite intense Turkish diplomatic and economic pressure. Switzerland has adopted laws that punish genocide denial.

=== Border dispute ===
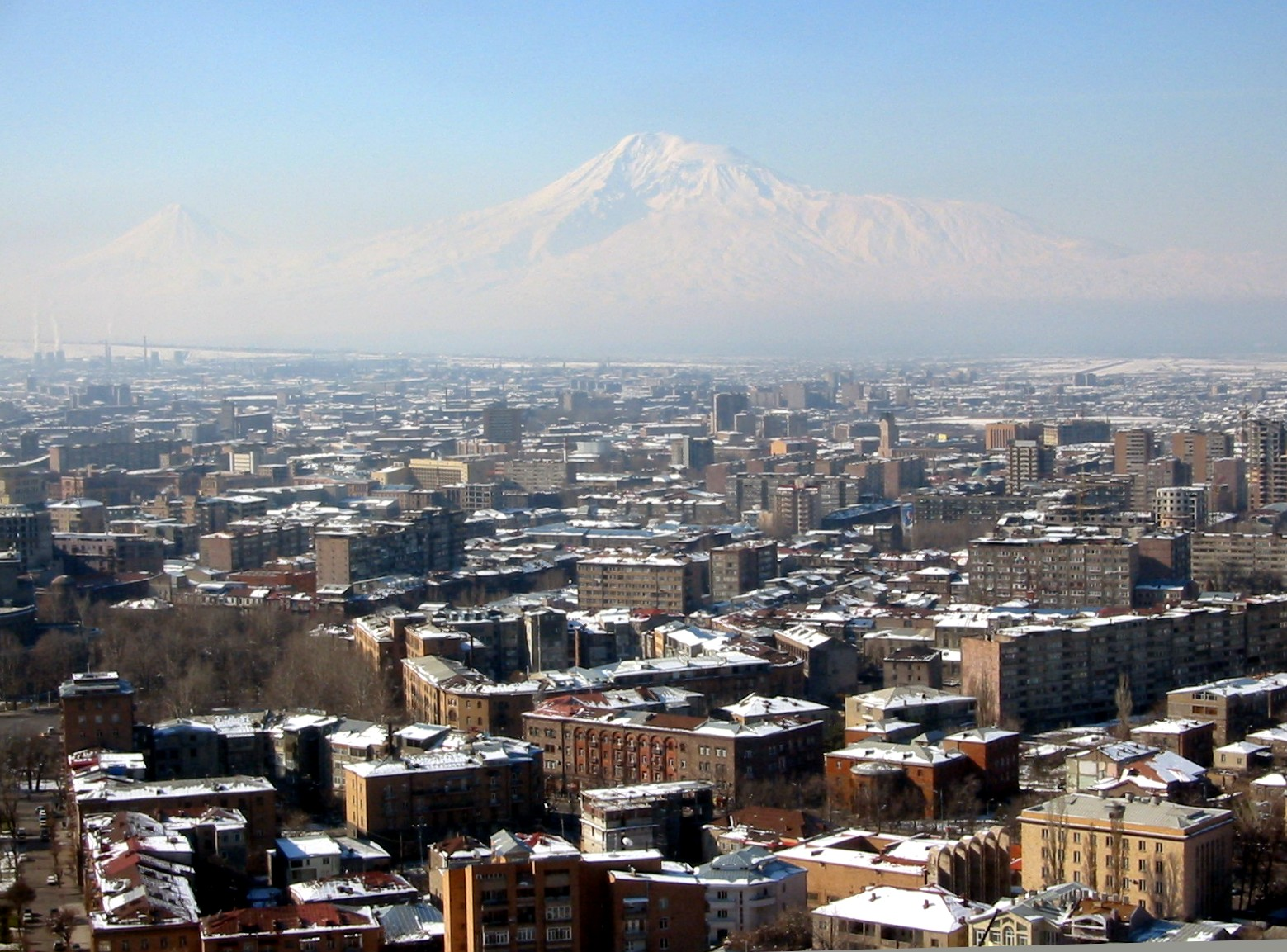
Mount Ararat was in ancient and medieval times at the center of Armenia. Today, it is located in Turkey, though still towering over the Armenian capital of Yerevan.

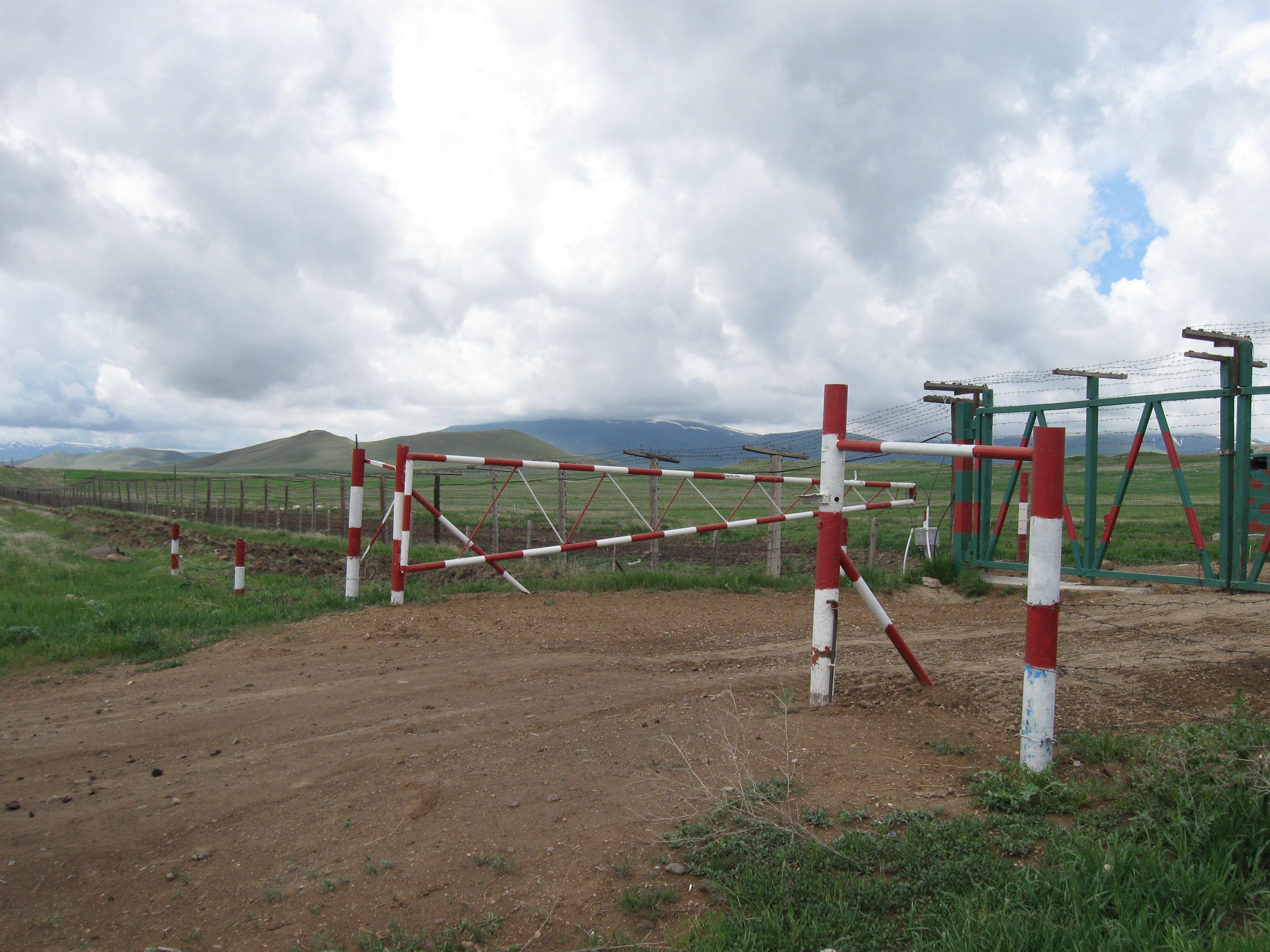
Armenia-Turkey border, Ani, Shirak Province.

In the post-Soviet climate of irredentism, Turkey was particularly wary of hard-line Armenian sentiment laying claim to the territory of "Historic Armenia" within Turkey. The Armenian Revolutionary Federation, an Armenian political party, continues to insist on a reversion towards the Treaty of Sèvres territorial boundaries. The treaty signed by the Ottoman Empire was rejected by the Republic of Turkey after it won the Turkish War of Independence and succeeded the empire.

These ongoing border disputes threatened to derail the negotiations between Armenia and Turkey prior to the announcement of the provisional road map in April 2009 with a group of Azerbaijani journalists reportedly refused permission to travel to Turkey to view renovation work on the border gate and Turkish journalist Servet Yanatma and four colleagues later being detained by Armenian authorities after attempting to film the Turkish–Armenian border without permission.

Yanatma, writing in the English-language Today's Zaman, however states that they were treated cordially and released after two hours and quotes an unnamed official as confirming that Armenia would adhere to the 1921 Treaty of Kars and renounce any territorial claims implicit in the national constitution's description of the Turkish territory of Eastern Anatolia as Western Armenia with the statement, "We are talking about the opening of a border. Can a border be opened if it is not recognised?"

It was in response to this issue following the announcement that the Dashnak Party decided to withdraw from the coalition government feeling that renunciation of Armenian territorial claims would be an unacceptably radical change in the country's foreign policy.

== Armenia–Turkey normalisation process meetings ==
- 1st Armenia–Turkey normalisation process meeting: 14 January 2022 in Moscow, Russia
- 2nd Armenia–Turkey normalisation process meeting: 24 February 2022 in Vienna, Austria
- 3rd Armenia–Turkey normalisation process meeting: 3 May 2022 in Vienna, Austria
- 4th Armenia–Turkey normalisation process meeting: 1 July 2022 in Vienna, Austria
- 5th Armenia–Turkey normalisation process meeting: 30 July 2024 in Alican, Iğdır, Turkey–Margara, Armenia

== Diplomacy ==
Republic of Armenia

- Armenia does not have an embassy in Ankara.

Republic of Turkey

- Turkey does not have an embassy in Yerevan.

== See also ==
- Anti-Armenian sentiment in Turkey
- Armenia–Azerbaijan relations
- Armenia–European Union relations
- Armenia–NATO relations
- Armenia–Turkey border
- Armenians in Turkey
- Conflicts of Turkey
- Foreign relations of Armenia
- Foreign relations of Turkey
- Peaceful coexistence
- Peaceful Evolution theory
- Recognition of the Armenian genocide
- Turks in Armenia
- United States recognition of the Armenian genocide
- Turkish–Azeri blockade of Armenia
- Soviet Union–Turkey relations
