= Syria–Turkey relations =

- Syria: Turkey

Diplomatic mission
- Embassy of Syria, Ankara: Embassy of Turkey, Damascus

Envoy
- Chargé d'Affaires en pied Fadi al-Qassem: Ambassador Nuh Yilmaz

Syria–Turkey relations are the relations between the Republic of Türkiye and the Syrian Arab Republic. Turkey shares its longest common border with Syria; various geographic and historical links also tie the two neighbouring countries together.

The traditionally tense relations between Turkey and Syria had been due to disputes including the self annexation of the Hatay Province to Turkey in 1939, water disputes resulting from the Southeastern Anatolia Project, and Syria's support for the Kurdistan Workers' Party (abbreviated as PKK) and the now-dissolved Armenian Secret Army for the Liberation of Armenia (abbreviated as ASALA) which has been recognised as a terrorist organisation by NATO, the EU, and many other countries. Relations improved greatly after October 1998, when PKK leader Abdullah Öcalan was expelled by the Syrian authorities. However, the Syrian civil war once again strained relations between the two countries, leading to the suspension of diplomatic contact. A serious incident occurred with the Syrian downing of a Turkish military training flight in June 2012, resulting in Turkey calling an emergency meeting of NATO.

Syria had maintained an embassy in Ankara and two consulates–general in Istanbul and Gaziantep. Turkey has an embassy in Damascus. Diplomatic relations between the countries were severed in March 2012, due to the Syrian civil war. Turkey is a full member of the Union for the Mediterranean and the Organisation of Islamic Cooperation (OIC) while Syria's membership was suspended due to the civil war. After the fall of the Assad regime in late 2024, Turkey was regarded as the biggest winner of the changing situation. Ankara quickly restored diplomatic relations with the transitional government in Damascus. Since then, Turkey has emerged as one of the closest allies of the Syrian transitional government.

== History ==
=== Turkish rule pre-WWI ===
Turkish dynasties ruled Syria and the region starting with the Tulunids in the late 9th century, followed by the Ikhshidids, Seljuq Empire, Burid dynasty, Artuqids, and Zengids until the late 12th century. In 1516, Syria was annexed by the Ottoman Empire and was part of it until WWI in the early 20th century.

=== Hatay annexation ===
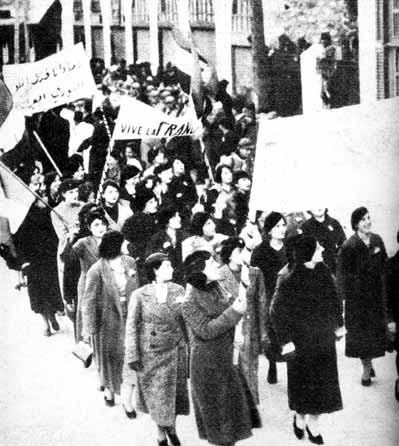
Protests in Damascus by women demonstrators against the secession of the Sanjak of Alexandretta in 1938 to become the Hatay Republic (and its joining of Turkey as the Hatay Province in 1939). One of the signs reads: "Our blood is sacrificed for the Syrian Arab Sanjak."

In 1938, the Sanjak of Alexandretta became independent from the French mandate of Syria as the Republic of Hatay, and following a referendum, 8 months later in 1939, it decided to join Turkey as the Hatay Province. This self-annexation was never recognized by Syria, which continues to show the Hatay Province of Turkey as part of Syria's territory on maps.

At present, Syrians hold the view that this land is historically Syrian and was illegally ceded in the late 1930s to Turkey by France – the mandatory occupying power of Syria (between 1920 and 1946). The Turks remember Syria as a former Ottoman vilayet. In 1938, the Turkish Army went into the former Syrian Mediterranean province with French approval and expelled most of its Alawite and Christian Arab and Armenian inhabitants. Before this, Arabs and Armenians were the majority of the provincial population. For the referendum, Turkey crossed tens of thousands of Turks into Alexandretta to vote.

In 1938, the province declared its independence from France and the following 29 June, the parliament of the newly declared Hatay Republic voted to join Turkey. This referendum has been labeled both "phoney" and "rigged", and that it was a way for the French to let Turks take over the area, hoping that they would turn on Hitler. Syrians still consider this land as integral Syrian territory. Syrians call this land Liwaaa aliskenderuna rather than the Turkish name of Hatay.

=== Water politics ===
Water disputes have been a major source of conflict as Turkey has constructed several dams on the Euphrates and Tigris rivers as part of the Southeastern Anatolia Project- GAP to develop the region. The project GAP was aimed at reducing the harsh living conditions of the Southeastern provinces of Turkey by building 19 dams on the rivers of Euphrates and Tigris. This project, however, would seriously reduce Syrian water resources.

Euphrates and Tigris are not the only rivers that tangle Turkish-Syrian relations. Water distribution of the Orantes River, which pours into the Mediterranean from the disputed province of Hatay, also causes problems between the two states.

=== Support to the PKK ===
Turkey has condemned Syria for supporting the PKK, which is listed as a terrorist organization internationally by a number of states and organizations, including the US, NATO, and the EU and has claimed that Syria employed Austrian former Schutzstaffel (SS) SS-Hauptsturmführer Alois Brunner to train Kurdish militants for attacks against Turkey.

The two countries came to the brink of war when Turkey threatened military action if Syria continued to shelter Abdullah Öcalan in Damascus, his long-time safe haven. Relations have improved since October 1998, when Öcalan was expelled by Damascus and Syria pledged to stop harbouring the PKK militants and the 1999 signing of the Adana agreement, following his subsequent capture in Kenya, envisaged security cooperation between the two countries.

=== Helicopter downing ===
In October 1989, 2 Syrian MiG-21's flew 12 miles (19 km) into Turkish airspace where they shot down a Turkish aircraft. All five of the crew on the Turkish aircraft died.

=== 2003–2011 diplomatic thaw ===
In The New Turkey (Granta Books, 2005), BBC correspondent Chris Morris claims that Syria was "for years a bitter foe" as "Turkey's secular democracy, its application for EU membership and its close relationship with the United States have long been regarded in Tehran, Baghdad and Damascus with intense suspicion. Islamists look at the secular state which buried the caliphate and think 'betrayal'; and Arab nationalists still haven't forgotten that Turks are their former colonial rulers." "But there's been a thaw, especially since the AKP came to power," and "the new Turkish model – trying to mix greater democracy and Islam together – is now the subject of curiosity and not a little envy."

The Turkish Parliament's refusal to cooperate militarily with the 2003 invasion of Iraq was a turning point in Syrian-Turkish bilateral relations as Syria's perceptions of Turkey as incapable of acting independently were altered.

The first ever visit to Turkey by a Syrian President was made by Bashar al-Assad to Ankara in January 2004. In late 2004, Turkish Prime Minister Recep Tayyip Erdoğan flew to Damascus to sign a free trade agreement, in the follow-up to former Turkish President Turgut Özal's high-level trade negotiations with Syrian authorities in the 1990s and Erdoğan's own recently successful bid to initiate a Turkish EU accession which would allow Europe, "to extend its reach to the borders Syria, Iraq and Iran." On 3 April 2007, Turkish Prime Minister Recep Tayyip Erdoğan and Syrian President Bashar Al Assad attended the opening ceremony of the Aleppo International Stadium.

In 2005, Turkish President Ahmet Necdet Sezer went to visit Damascus, despite U.S. objections, during the Cedar Revolution in Lebanon.

In 2008, Turkey was invited to play the role of facilitator between Syria and Israel to solve their dispute over control over the Golan Heights, but these talks were abandoned after four rounds, which included a visit by Syrian President Bashar al-Assad to Turkish Prime Minister Tayyip Erdoğan at Bodrum in August, following the deterioration in Turkey-Israel relations over the 2008–2009 Israel-Gaza conflict.

==== Military cooperation ====
On 26 April 2009, the two states announced an "unprecedented" three-day military manoeuvre involving ground forces along their mutual border in what was described as "a step further in their ever-expanding cooperation." According to Turkish military sources, "The aim of the exercise is to boost friendship, cooperation, and confidence between the two countries land forces, and to increase the ability of border troops to train and work together." The exercise which commenced on 27 April involved teams from each country crossing the border to visit outposts.

Visiting Syrian Defense Minister Hasan Turkmani and Turkish Defense Minister Vecdi Gönül also signed a letter of intent giving the green light for cooperation in the defence industry, on the sidelines of the 9th International Defence Industry Fair (IDEF'09) that commenced in Istanbul the same day, as a sign of the level of political relations reached between the two states, although a Turkish defence industry source emphasised that, "it does not mean that the two countries will immediately enter into cooperation in arms production."

==== 2009 Turkish Presidential visit to Syria ====
Turkish President Gül's 15–17 May official visit to Syria was made at the invitation of Damascus in reciprocation of Syrian President Assad's 2007 official visit to Turkey. A senior Turkish diplomat confirmed that, "The main topic on the agenda and the goal of the visit is the maintenance of momentum that has built up in bilateral relations within the last decade." The Turkish delegation included Foreign Minister Ahmet Davutoğlu, Foreign Trade Minister Zafer Çağlayan, Agriculture Minister and Culture and Tourism Minister Ertuğrul Günay.

Shortly before the visit new Syrian Ambassador to Turkey, Nidal Qablan confirmed that Syria was ready to restart the Turkish mediated peace negotiations with Israel and Gül supported the call, following his meeting with Assad, stating that, "We have heard Syria say it is ready to resume the peace talks from the point where they stopped with the previous [Israeli] government. We in Turkey are also ready." Assad confirmed, "Turkey's role is important because we have trust in Turkey." Israeli President Shimon Peres dismissed these calls stating, "The Syrians should be ready to talk. If President al-Assad wants peace, why is he shy? We suggested direct talks many times. He thinks direct talks are a prize for Israel. It's not a prize. It's normal."

=== Friction due to Syrian Civil War ===
Since the start of Syrian Civil War, relations between Syria and Turkey greatly deteriorated. The Syrian conflict began to impact Turkey when at least 3,000 Syrian refugees fled Syria as a consequence of such incidents as Syrian army operation in Jisr ash-Shugur in June 2011. In June 2011, Turkish prime minister Erdogan described to Anadolu Agency, his feeling that "They [Syria] are not acting in a humane manner. This is savagery." However, at the beginning, the Turkish government refrained from describing the Syrians who fled to Turkey as "refugees" or "asylum-seekers", instead referring to them as guests, and Erdogan, while demanding the implementation of promised reforms by the Syrian government, initially refrained from calling for Bashar al-Assad's departure, although he later would.

==== Timeline of border clashes ====
On 9 August 2011, the BBC and other news sites reported that Turkey sent its foreign minister, Ahmet Davutoğlu, to Syria to give the government a "tough" message. Erdogan has said that he is becoming impatient with the "savagery" of Bashar al-Assad's government. Ahmet Davutoğlu also announced that "We are completely suspending all of these trade relations, all agreements between Turkey and Syria have been suspended."

The Turkish pilgrim bus attack occurred on 21 November 2011 when two buses carrying Turkish pilgrims returning from Saudi Arabia came under fire from Syrian soldiers. The attack occurred at a checkpoint near Homs, as a convoy of eight or nine Turkish buses was making its way towards Turkey via the Bab Hawa border crossing. The gunfire left two people injured. According to a driver, when told that the passengers were Turks, "Syrian soldiers emerged from behind sandbags and cursed Recep Tayyip Erdoğan... Then they suddenly opened fire at the bus."

On 9 April 2012, the Syrian envoy to Turkey was summoned after Syrian forces fired across the Syria–Turkey border. At least two were killed and many others injured in the incident.

On 22 June 2012, Syria shot down a Turkish Air Force RF-4E reconnaissance jet near the Turkish-Syrian border. The Syrian military alleged the jet had violated Syrian airspace. However, Turkish president Abdullah Gül and other spokesmen did not confirm this and emphasized that brief incursions into neighboring airspace by high-speed jets are routine occurrences. Gül stated that "it is not possible to cover over a thing like this. Whatever is necessary will no doubt be done." The Turkish and Syrian navies conducted a search for the two pilots of the downed Turkish aircraft.

In August 2012, Turkey began to hold high level meetings with the USA on plans to replace the Syrian government.

On 3 October 2012, Turkey attacked troops in Syria, after a Syrian mortar shell killed five people. Turkish parliament approved cross border operations. Turkish Prime Minister Tayyip Erdogan announced 5 October "We are not interested in war, but we're not far from it either,"

On 10 October 2012, Turkish Air Force F-16s intercepted a Syrian Air Airbus A320, flight RB442 from Moscow to Damascus, in Turkish airspace and forced it to land at Ankara Esenboğa Airport, suspecting it was carrying Russian-made weapons. Inspectors confiscated military communications equipment and items "thought to be missile parts". Syria accused Turkey of "air piracy". On the same day, the airline chief said in an interview that Turkey violated the Chicago Convention on International Civil Aviation Syria subsequently banned Turkish civilian flights from its airspace.

On 23 October 2012, an anti-aircraft shell from Syria hit a health center in Turkey's Hatay Province.

On 11 May 2013, two car bombs exploded in the town of Reyhanlı, Hatay Province, Turkey. At least 43 people were killed and 140 more were injured in the attack. The car bombs were left outside Reyhanlı's town hall and post office. The first exploded at around 13:45 local time (10:45 GMT) and the second exploded about 15 minutes later. People attempting to help those injured in the first explosion were caught in the second blast. This attack was the deadliest single act of terrorism to occur on Turkish soil.

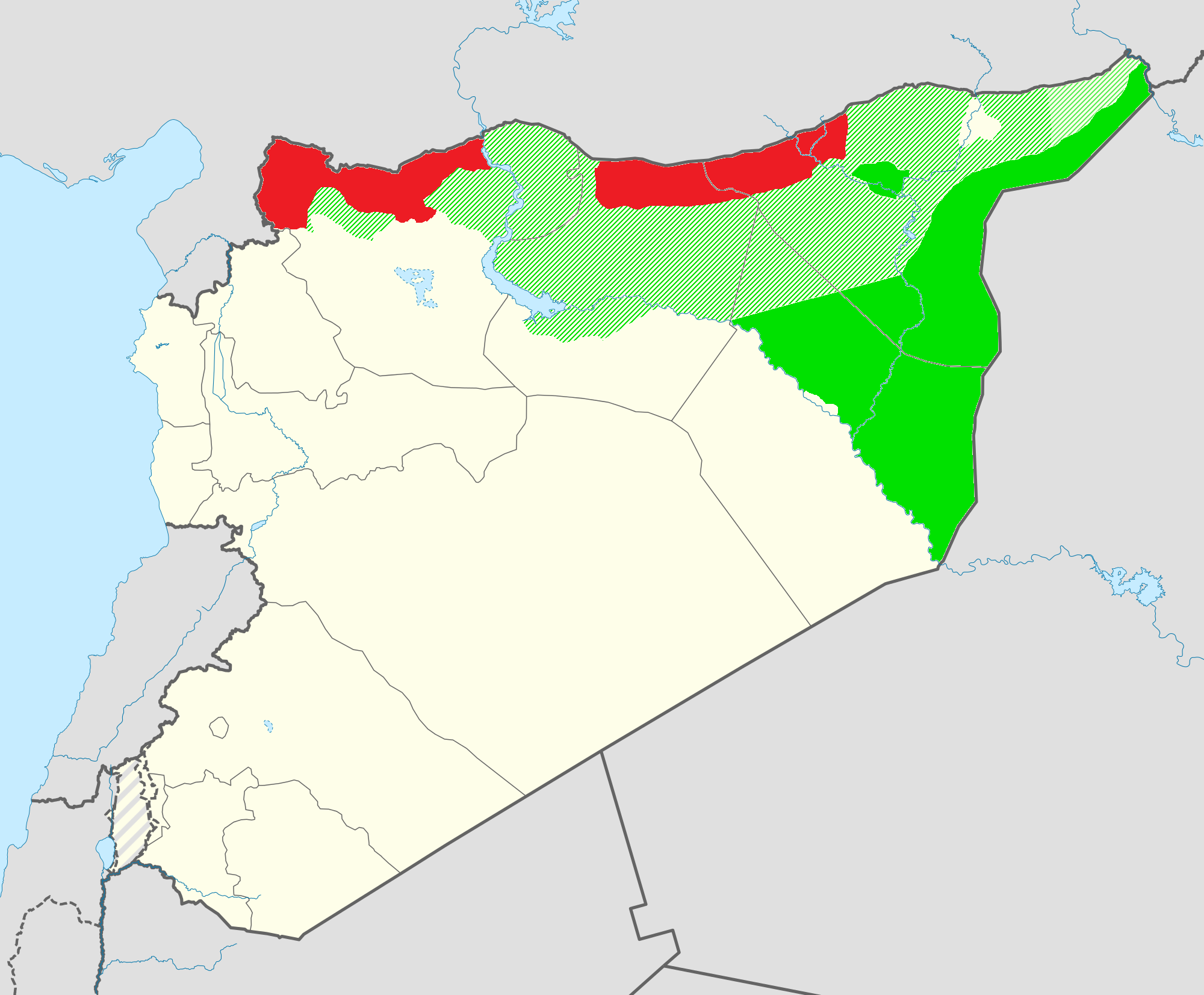
SDF-controlled territory (green) and Turkish-occupied territory (red) in October 2019

On 23 March 2014, Turkey shot down a Syrian combat jet in Hatay Province near Turkish-Syrian border. The initial announcement was made by Turkish Prime Minister Recep Tayyip Erdoğan in a speech during the 2014 Turkish local elections campaign. Turkey claimed that two Turkish Air Force F-16s downed the plane that breached Turkish airspace and ignored warnings, as a result of the infringement of the new engagement rules declared by the Republic of Turkey, after Syria shot down a Turkish reconnaissance plane on 22 June 2012. The pilot jumped off the plane according to witness reports. Syria condemned the aggression and argued that the plane was following rebels and it did not violate Turkish airspace. However, according to the new engagement rules, two countries could defend themselves if the other come close to their borders, perceiving the action as a threat.

On 18 June, based on information provided by a Euro-Med Monitor team, Turkish border guards have killed eleven Syrians, including four children and two women, while they were trying to cross the Turkish-Syrian border by opening the fire directly on them once they reached Syria's Idlib province. The Turkish government claimed that the authorities meant to kill smugglers and terrorists, not civilians, in search of protecting their borders. Some eyewitness testimonies from refugee families confirmed to the Euro-Med Monitor team that all the ones who were killed by the Turkish guards were civilians. Most of the deaths, reached to the borders, ran away from ISIS control before they got and hid in the northern Aleppo countryside for 15 days. Testimonies collected by the Euro-Med Monitor team said that a smuggler helped the victims get to Syria's Idlib province. The victims were deceived by the smuggler when he told them that the Turkish borders are safe and gave them the legal permission to cross the borders. Turkish border guards have killed 60 Syrians before as they were trying to cross the border.

On 24 August 2016, Turkey and Turkish backed rebels attacked ISIS positions across the border, from Jarabulus west to Al-Rai, taking a series of towns and taking a hold of a strip 5 to 20 km deep. Turkey called this operation Euphrates Shield.

In recordings released in 2014, Turkish intelligence chief Hakan Fidan suggests that rockets should be fired from Syria into Turkey to justify military action in retaliation.

In 2020, following the Balyun airstrikes, Turkey initiated Operation Spring Shield against the Syrian army.

In the aftermath of Syrians attack on Turkish troops, Turkey closed its main border crossings into northwest Syria in July 2024.

==== Rapprochement plan not achieved ====
In October 2021, Turkish Foreign Minister Mevlüt Çavuşoğlu met with Syrian Foreign Minister Faisal Mekdad at the Non-Aligned Movement summit, and relations between the two countries' intelligence agencies were resumed. Cavusoglu publicly announced this in August 2022 and called for reconciliation between the Syrian government and the opposition.

The official newspaper Türkiye published 5 conditions set by the Syrian government to resume diplomatic relations, as follows:

1. The return of the government's control of Idlib, stopping support for the rebels and respecting Syrian sovereignty (end of Turkish occupation),
2. Transfer the management of the Reyhanlı – Cilvegözü border crossing and the Kessab Customs crossing to the Syrian authorities,
3. Opening a commercial corridor between Damascus and Cilvegözü,
4. Damascus has full control of the strategic transportation M4 highway, located on the line between Aleppo, Latakia, Deir Ezzor and Hasaka in eastern Syria,
5. Turkey provides diplomatic support to Syria regarding US and EU sanctions.

In return, Ankara wants from Damascus the complete cleansing of the areas of the (PKK/YPG), the safe return of refugees and the proper completion of political and military integration between the opposition and the government.

In September 2022, Reuters reported that the heads of Syrian and Turkish intelligence had met in Damascus in recent weeks. The talks made significant progress and sought to pave the way for meetings at higher levels.

On 19 November 2022, Turkey launched airstrikes over several towns in northern Syria, a week after the 2022 Istanbul bombing.

On 29 November 2022, United Nations special envoy for Syria Geir Pederson warned the Security Council that the current military escalation in Syria is dangerous to civilians and regional stability, and urged Turkey and the Kurdish-led forces in northern Syria to de-escalate.

In early December 2022, Reuters reported that the Syrian leadership was still resisting Russia's efforts to convene a summit between Assad and Erdoğan. This is due to the unwillingness to grant Erdoğan a "victory" that would enhance his chances in the June 2023 elections. In a major breakthrough, on 28 December, both countries' defense ministers and intelligence chiefs met in Moscow, and the talks were described as fruitful.

In late March 2023, Turkey had taken the path of easing economic sanctions against Syria, as Erdogan is seeking a "bilateral normalization effort" with his Syrian counterpart Bashar Al-Assad, according to Le Monde. Earlier, US Secretary of State Antony Blinken and Turkish Foreign Minister Mevlüt Çavuşoğlu met in Ankara to seek a solution to the separatist-controlled north of Syria, an issue long at heart for Turkey.

However, Syria's plan for reconciliation with Turkey did not succeed because the then-Assad regime demanded that Turkey withdraw its troops from northern Syria.

=== Post-Assad regime relations ===
Following the end of Assad's regime on 8 December 2024, Turkish intelligence chief Ibrahim Kalin met with Ahmed al-Sharaa, leader of the Hay'at Tahrir al-Sham, and caretaker prime minister Mohammad al-Bashir in Damascus. Turkey reopened its embassy in Syria on 14 December, after it was closed down for the last 12 years, with Burhan Köroğlu taking charge as Turkish chargé d'affaires en pied in Syria until the appointment of an ambassador. On 22 December, Turkey's Foreign Minister Hakan Fidan held a meeting with Ahmed al-Sharaa in Damascus to support the transitional government.

In early January 2025, Ahmed al-Sharaa mentioned that Syria would establish strategic relations with Turkey in the future. On 15 January, Turkish Airlines stated it will resume flights to Damascus on the 23 January. On 4 February, al-Sharaa visited Turkey as his second foreign visit and met with President Recep Tayyip Erdoğan. Al-Sharaa said in his statement that Syria is considering establishing a defense pact with Türkiye, which would include military bases to be established by the Turkish army in Syria. On 2 August 2025, it was reported that Turkey began supplying gas to Syria by the Kilis Aleppo pipeline.

On 19 November 2025, Nuh Yılmaz was appointed the Turkish ambassador to Syria, commencing his duties on 22 December 2025, and replacing Burhan Köroğlu, who had served as chargé d'affaires en pied.

The Syrian government's liberalisation of trade resulted in increasing dependence on Turkey, as Syrian imports from Turkey rose 60% from 2024 while Syrian exports to Turkey declined by half. This has resulted in industrialists in Syria expressing frustration at the government over a growing trade deficit with Turkey. Turkey also developed its influence within the Syrian military post-Assad. After the integration of the Turkish auxiliary force of the Syrian National Army into the Syrian Army, Turkey signalled that it expected its influence to be preserved within the emerging Syrian military structure by facilitating the appointment of SNA to high-profile positions.

== See also ==
- Foreign relations of Syria
- Foreign relations of Turkey
- Levant Quartet
- Turks in Syria
- Syrians in Turkey
- Turkish occupation of northern Syria
- Operation Olive Branch
- Syria–Turkey barrier
- Syria–Turkey border
