= Manoyan =

Manoyan (Armenian: Մանոյան) is an Armenian surname. Notable people with the surname include:

- David Manoyan (born 1990), Armenian footballer
- Giro Manoyan (born 1962), Armenian politician
