= Zurich Protocols =

2009 failed attempt to normalize relations between Armenia and Turkey

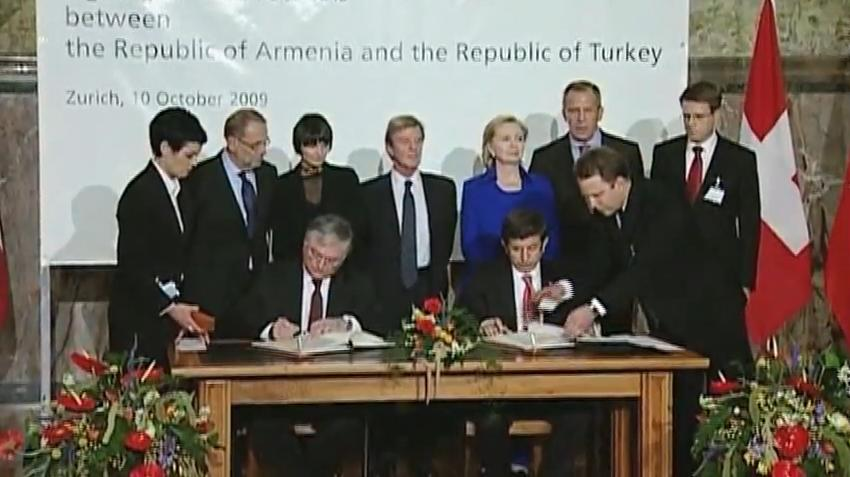
Nalbandyan and Davutoğlu signing the accord

The Zurich Protocols were two bilateral protocols signed in 2009 by Armenia and Turkey that envisioned starting the process of normalizing relations between the two countries. The Protocols included provisions for the establishment of formal diplomatic relations, the opening of the Turkish-Armenian border (which has been closed since 1993), and the establishment of a joint historical commission on the Armenian genocide issue. The agreement, which later proved to be ineffectual, had been brokered by the United States, Russia and France.

On 10 October 2009, the foreign ministers, Ahmet Davutoğlu for Turkey and Eduard Nalbandyan for Armenia, signed in Zurich the two protocols in a ceremony attended also by then U.S. Secretary of State Hillary Clinton, EU High Representative for Common Foreign and Security Policy Javier Solana, French Minister of Foreign Affairs Bernard Kouchner and Foreign Minister of Russia Sergey Lavrov.

The Protocols required ratification from parliaments of both countries. In an effort to de-link issues, the protocols did not mention the conflict between Armenia and Azerbaijan over Nagorno-Karabakh. They also did not include a deadline for ratification.

On 12 January 2010, the Constitutional Court of Armenia approved the Protocols while making a number of observations that the Turkish side viewed as containing "preconditions and restrictive provisions which impair the letter and spirit of the protocols". The Turkish side also began to tie the normalization process with the Nagorno-Karabakh conflict, with Turkish Prime Minister Recep Tayyip Erdoğan stating that the Turkish-Armenian border would not be opened without the withdrawal of Armenian forces from Azerbaijani territory.

The Protocols faced immense criticism in both countries, with some Armenians accusing their government of selling out and some in Turkey upset that the Protocols did not refer to the Nagorno-Karabakh issue. Meanwhile, Azerbaijan reacted negatively to the Protocols and applied pressure on Turkey not to go forward with the rapprochement with Armenia. Thus, the Protocols languished in both nations' parliaments without ratification after its signing.

In February 2015, the Armenian part, represented by President Sargsyan, recalled the protocols from parliament, citing the "absence of political will" on the Turkish side. Then, in December 2017 citing lack of any "positive progress towards their implementation" by Turkey, the Armenian side vowed to declare them void and null, which Armenia formally did on 1 March 2018.

Despite the bitterness resulting from the stalling of the normalization process, some authors think that the Zurich Protocols could still represent a way forward for the Armenia-Turkey normalization process.

== Background ==
=== 2008 Turkish Presidential visit to Armenia ===
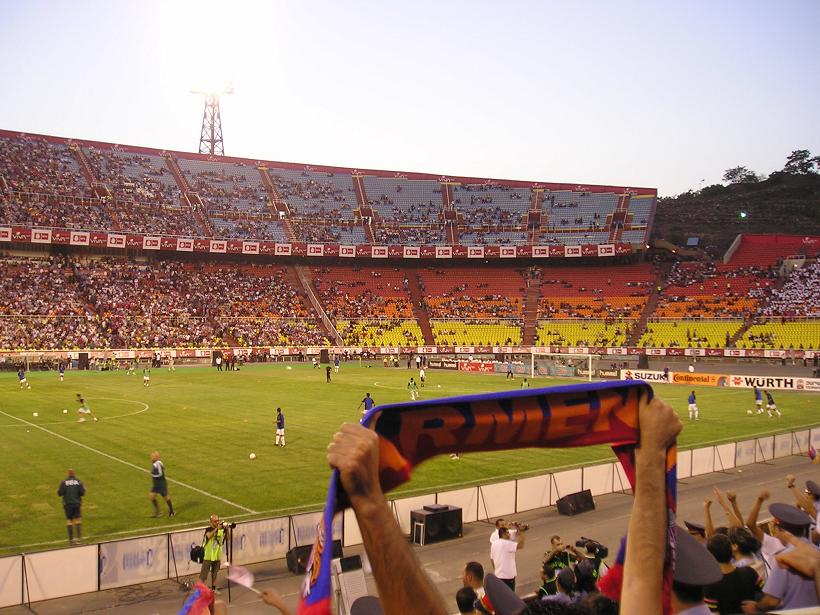
Armenia vs Turkey FIFA World Cup qualifier match played on 6 September 2008 at Hrazdan Stadium, Yerevan, attended by Turkish President Abdullah Gül upon the invitation of Armenian President Serzh Sargsyan

In September 2008, Turkish President Abdullah Gül became the first Turkish head of state to visit Armenia after he accepted the invitation of Armenian President Serzh Sargsyan to attend a FIFA World Cup qualifier football match between the Turkish and Armenian national football teams. Talks during the game focused on bilateral relations and Karabakh, and did not touch upon the Genocide, though Turkish Foreign Minister Ali Babacan raised the issue soon afterward. Both of the presidents and their countries' respective press reflected positively on the visit setting the ground for a thaw in diplomatic relations that was expected to have made great progress in time for Sargsyan's reciprocal visit to Turkey in October to watch the return match.

=== Negotiations for the normalisation of diplomatic ties ===
On the eve of the US President Barack Obama's 2009 visit to Turkey, sources in Ankara and Yerevan announced that a deal might soon be struck to reopen the border between the two states and exchange diplomatic personnel to which the new US president responded positively as he urged Turkey to come to terms with the past and resolve the Armenian question. Officials in Azerbaijan however responded with concern, prompting heated debate in the Turkish Parliament with Nationalist Movement Party (MHP) leader Devlet Bahçeli sharing the Azerbaijani people's "rightful concerns" in warning the government "your approach to Armenia harms our dignity," and Republican People's Party (CHP) leader Deniz Baykal asking, "How can we ignore the ongoing occupation of Azerbaijan?" Turkish Prime Minister Erdoğan attempted to allay these concerns on April 10 by announcing that "unless Azerbaijan and Armenia sign a protocol on Nagorno-Karabakh, we will not sign any final agreement with Armenia on ties. We are doing preliminary work but this definitely depends on resolution of the Nagorno-Karabakh problem." Turkish Foreign Minister Ali Babacan clarified that "we want a solution in which everybody is a winner," in a statement made prior to the April 15 Black Sea Economic Cooperation (BSEC) Foreign Ministers Council in Yerevan, adding "we don't say, 'Let's first solve one problem and solve the other later.' We want a similar process to start between Azerbaijan and Armenia. We are closely watching the talks between Azerbaijan and Armenia."

Armenian Foreign Minister Eduard Nalbandyan confirmed that "Turkey and Armenia have gone a long way toward opening the Turkey-Armenia border, and they will come closer to opening it soon," but dismissed any connection to the Nagorno-Karabakh dispute which he stated was being handled through the OSCE Minsk Group. Armenian Revolutionary Federation (ARF) Political Director Giro Manoyan responded well to the rapprochement and echoed Babacan in the statement "not only Armenia, but both parties will win if the border is opened" and responded to reminders about the mistreatment of the Turkish flag during commemorations of Armenian Genocide Day the previous year by stating that "I promise that no such thing will take place this time, if we can keep control" before going on to warn "negotiations will be cut if the resolution of the Nagorno-Karabakh dispute between Armenia and Azerbaijan is set as a precondition."

The International Crisis Group (ICG) issued a report on the normalisation stating that "the politicized debate whether to recognize as genocide the destruction of much of the Ottoman Armenian population and the stalemated Armenia-Azerbaijan conflict over Nagorno-Karabakh should not halt momentum" whilst "the unresolved Armenia-Azerbaijan conflict over Nagorno-Karabakh still risks undermining full adoption and implementation of the potential package deal between Turkey and Armenia", the "bilateral détente with Armenia ultimately could help Baku recover territory better than the current stalemate."

=== Announcement of the provisional roadmap ===
On 22 April 2009, it was announced that high-level diplomatic talks underway in Switzerland since 2007 "had achieved tangible progress and mutual understanding," and that "a road map has been identified," for normalizing diplomatic relations between the two countries, although no formal text had yet been signed. In an official statement the following day Turkish Prime Minister Erdoğan confirmed that "when everything becomes concrete, an agreement will be signed. There is no such text yet; there is a preliminary agreement. That means we have an ongoing process. That is what we mean by a timetable."

The Turkish newspaper Radikal confirmed that an intergovernmental conference would be established between Ankara and Yerevan to discuss in detail all the issues "from economy to transportation" agreed on in the "comprehensive framework for normalisation," whilst Today's Zaman concluded that this cautious approach by Turkish authorities was intended to minimise criticism from Azerbaijan and nationalist Turks who would complain of "submission to Western pressure" but goes on to quote an unnamed Western diplomat who speaking to Reuters confirmed that "all the documents have been agreed in principle" and that "we are talking about weeks or months."

=== Reactions to the provisional roadmap ===
The Armenian Revolutionary Party responded to the announcement in an April 26 closed-door meeting with a decision to withdraw its 16 deputies, who held three ministries in the Armenian government. Although Armenian President Sargsyan stated that no concessions had been agreed upon and that the details would be made public, ARF Political Director Giro Manoyan stated that the party considers itself deceived because it was not informed about the agreement in advance and that renunciation of Armenian territorial claims that are reported to be a part of the agreement would be an unacceptably radical change in the country's foreign policy.

Reaction to the announcement within Turkey was more muted with opposition MHP leader Bahçeli complaining that "Armenia knows what is going on; Switzerland knows what is going on; Turkish officials involved in the process know. That means the Turkish nation and Parliament are the only ones who have no information about the process" before going on to conclude that "it would be beneficial if the prime minister or the minister for foreign affairs would inform Parliament. We will follow developments, but for the moment we don't know the depth of the agreement. Taking the explanations made so far into account, we are monitoring whether any further steps are being taken in the issue of opening the border."

International reaction to the announcement was positive, despite concerns that adverse reaction from Azerbaijan could affect European energy security, with an April 23 joint statement from EU Enlargement Commissioner Olli Rehn and External Relations Commissioner Benita Ferrero-Waldner stating "we welcome the progress in the normalization of relations between Turkey and Armenia" and a statement from the office of US Vice President Joe Biden following a phone conversation with Armenian President Sargsyan stating, "The Vice President applauded President Sarksyan's leadership, and underscored the administration's support for both Armenia and Turkey in this process." US Secretary of State Hillary Clinton lauded the provisional roadmap as a historical step following a phone conversation with Armenian Foreign Minister Nalbandyan in which she urged him to move forward with the roadmap in an effort to normalize relations and to take a step forward on the Nagorno-Karabakh dispute.

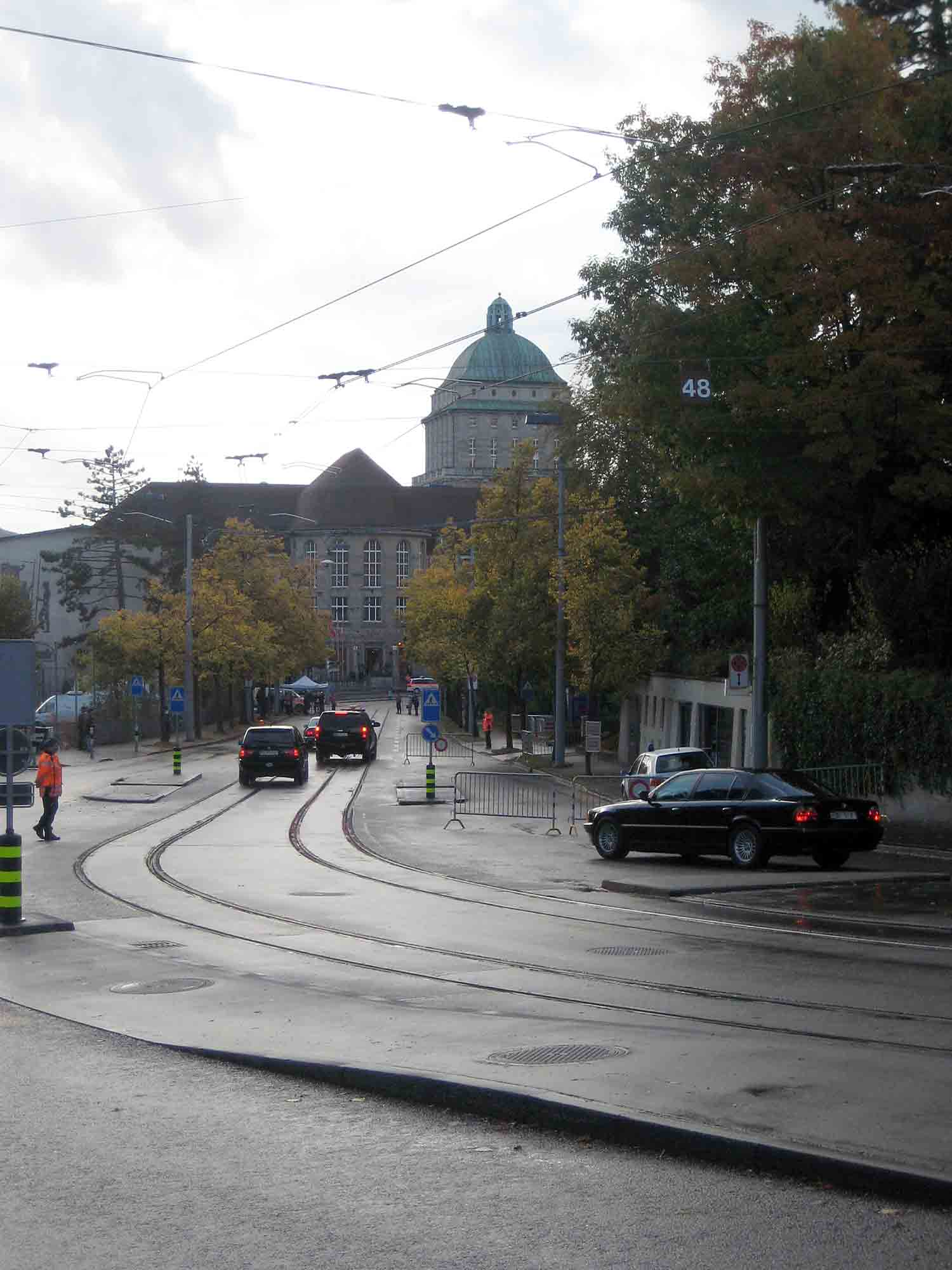
US Secretary of State Hillary Clinton approaching the building of the University of Zurich on October 10, 2009, to attend the signing of an accord to establish diplomatic relations between Turkey and Armenia.

The rapprochement with Armenia featured on the agenda of the April 28 meeting of the Turkish National Security Council (MGK) at Çankaya Palace under Turkish President Gül. Following the meeting an official press release stated "the recent statements of some of the countries and our initiatives regarding the events of 1915 have been evaluated. However, it has been emphasized that the history of the Turkish and Armenian nations can be discussed only in ... a scientific and unbiased fashion", whilst Chief of the Turkish General Staff Gen. İlker Başbuğ confirmed "the prime minister has clearly said the border opening will take place at the time when Armenian troops are withdrawn. We completely agree with this."

Following a reportedly tense May 7 OSCE Minsk Group mediated peace summit between Armenian President Sargsyan and Azerbaijani President İlham Aliyev at the residence of the US Ambassador in Prague, on the sidelines of the EU Eastern Partnership conference, that resulted in "no serious progress" Turkish President Gül met separately with the two leaders to propose four-way talks on the conflict to include Russia when they next meet at the St. Petersburg Economic Forum in July.

=== 2009 Turkish Presidential visit to Azerbaijan and Russia ===
Armenian authorities responded to comments made by Turkish Prime Minister Erdoğan during his official visit to Baku that "there is a relation of cause and effect here. The occupation of Nagorno-Karabakh is the cause, and the closure of the border is the effect. Without the occupation ending, the gates will not be opened" with a statement from the office of Armenian President Sargsyan that read "the president said that, as he repeatedly pointed out during Armenian-Turkish contacts, any Turkish attempt to interfere in the settlement of the Nagorno-Karabakh problem can only harm that process." Armenian Foreign Minister Nalbandian reiterated that "concerning the Armenian-Turkish normalisation process, over the past year, following the initiative of the Armenian President together with our Turkish neighbours and with the help of our Swiss partners, we have advanced toward opening one of the last closed borders in Europe and the normalisation of our relations without preconditions. The ball is on the Turkish side now. And we hope that they will find the wisdom and the courage to make the last decisive step. We wish to be confident that the necessary political will can eventually leave behind the mentality of the past." ARF Chairman Armen Rustamian responded by accusing Turkey of "attempting to dictate conditions on the Nagorno-Karabakh resolution process, visibly taking Azerbaijan's side and obscuring the Armenian-Azerbaijani conflict."

Erdoğan flew on from Baku to Sochi, Russia, for a 16 May "working visit" with Russian Prime Minister Vladimir Putin at which he stated "Turkey and Russia have responsibilities in the region. We have to take steps for the peace and well being of the region. This includes the Nagorno-Karabakh problem, the Middle East dispute, the Cyprus problem." Putin responded that "Russia and Turkey seek for such problems to be resolved and will facilitate this in every way," but "as for difficult problems from the past–and the Karabakh problem is among such issues–a compromise should be found by the participants in the conflict. Other states which help reach a compromise in this aspect can play a role of mediators and guarantors to implement the signed agreements."

Armenian Parliament Deputy Speaker Samvel Nikoyan greeted a group of visiting Turkish journalists by stating, "It is nice that you are here to establish ties between journalists of the two countries. There are ties between the peoples. And I wish there were ties between the two parliaments." The journalists, who were part of the International Hrant Dink Foundation Turkey-Armenia Journalist Dialogue Project, were however subsequently denied visas to visit the disputed Karabakh region in what according to Karabakh Public Council for Foreign and Security Chairman Masis Mayilian was a politically motivated response to Erdoğan's statement in Baku.

== Signing of the accord ==
Following more than one year of talks the accord between Armenia and Turkey was signed by the foreign ministers of the two countries, Ahmet Davutoğlu and Eduard Nalbandyan on 10 October 2009.

The signing took place in Zürich, Switzerland.

The signature ceremony had been delayed for a three-hour lapse when disagreements surfaced at the signing over unidentified "unacceptable formulations", according to Armenia. The Armenian side did not accept the speech the Turkish foreign minister was going to make. One official said it had been "pulled back from the brink".

== Azerbaijani reaction ==
The signing of the Protocols envisioning the establishment of diplomatic relations and the opening of the Turkish-Armenian border without any mention of the Nagorno-Karabakh conflict was received extremely negatively in Azerbaijan. Following the signing of the Protocols, Azerbaijan's foreign ministry released a statement declaring that the move "directly contradicts the national interests of Azerbaijan and overshadows the spirit of brotherly relations between Azerbaijan and Turkey built on deep historical roots.” Azerbaijani President Ilham Aliyev made statements implying that Azerbaijan could increase the price of gas sold to Turkey and redirect its gas resources towards Russia rather than continue developing gas projects with Turkey and Western countries. At the same time, Azerbaijan funded lobbying, public relations and media efforts against the Protocols. Soon after the signing of the Protocols, Turkish Foreign Minister Davutoğlu declared that the withdrawal of Armenian forces from Azerbaijani territory continued to be one of Turkey's "primary national issues." In December 2009, Prime Minister Erdoğan stated that the process of Turkish-Armenian normalisation was conditional on Armenian troop withdrawal from Azerbaijani territory and explicitly linked the Turkish-Armenian process with the Nagorno-Karabakh conflict.

== Suspension of the ratification process ==
On 12 January 2010, the Protocols were sent to the Constitutional Court of Armenia in order to have their constitutionality be approved. Although finding the Protocols in conformity with the Constitution of Armenia, the Constitutional Court made references to the preamble of the protocols, in particular to three main issues. Firstly, the Court stated that Armenia will proceed with its effort to seek worldwide recognition of the Armenian genocide. Secondly, it rejected any link between the new agreement with Turkey and the Nagorno-Karabakh issue. Thirdly and most vitally, it stated that the implementation of the protocols did not imply Armenia's official recognition of the existing Turkish-Armenian border established by the 1921 Treaty of Kars. By doing so, the Constitutional Court rejected one of the main premises of the protocols, i.e. "the mutual recognition of the existing border between the two countries as defined by relevant treaties of international law". Soon after, the Turkish Foreign Ministry released a statement describing the Court's decision as containing "preconditions and restrictive provisions which impair the letter and spirit of the protocols.” Turkish Foreign Minister Ahmet Davutoğlu expressed his displeasure and maintained that the Court effectively revised the protocols and created a new legal situation.

Armenians worldwide protested against the deal because of the controversial concessions that the Armenian leadership was preparing to make, most notably in regard to the Armenian genocide and the Turkish-Armenian border. Eventually, the Armenian ruling coalition decided to address the president with a request to suspend the ratification process after Turkish Prime Minister Erdogan announced multiple times that the Turkish ratification depended on a peace deal in Nagorno-Karabakh conflict. Their statement on 22 April 2010 said:

Considering the Turkish side's refusal to fulfill the requirement to ratify the accord without preconditions in a reasonable time, making the continuation of the ratification process in the national parliament pointless, we consider it necessary to suspend this process.

(...)

The political majority in the National Assembly considers statements from the Turkish side in recent days as unacceptable, specifically those by Prime Minister Erdogan, who has again made the ratification of the Armenia-Turkish protocols by the Turkish parliament directly dependent on a resolution over Nagorno-Karabakh.

On the same day, President Sargsyan suspended the ratification process while announcing that Armenia is not suspending the process of normalisation of relationships with Turkey as a whole.

On 1 March 2018 Armenia's Security Council formally annulled the long-dormant protocols.

== See also ==
- Armenia–Turkey border
- Armenia-Turkey relations
- Madrid Principles
