= Giro Manoyan =

Armenian politician

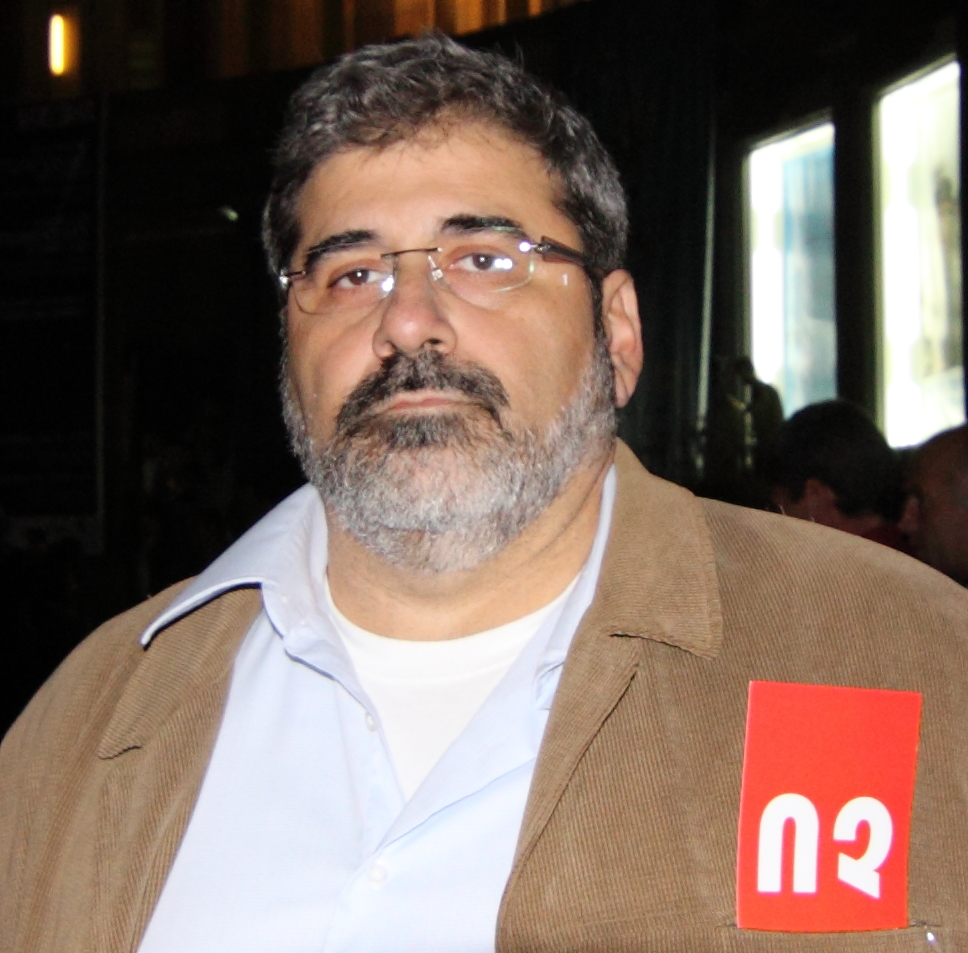
Giro Manoyan at an October 2009 demonstration against the signing of the Armenia-Turkey protocols

Giro (Kiro) Manoyan (Armenian: Կիրօ Մանոյեան) is an Armenian politician, one of the leaders of ARF Dashnaktsutiun and the head of its Armenian Cause Office.

Manoyan attended Concordia University in Montreal, Quebec, Canada, majoring in Political Science. In the 1980s he was the executive director of the Armenian National Committee of Canada. From 1989 to 1999, he was a member of the editorial board of the Horizon Weekly Armenian newspaper, in Montreal; from October 1991 to September 1999 he was its editor-in-chief. Since 2000, he has been the Director of the International Secretariat of the Armenian Revolutionary Federation Bureau in Yerevan. At the ARF 32nd World Congress, convened in Armenia in January 2015, he was elected a member of the ARF Bureau,

On April 23, 2011, Manoyan (In his capacity as head of the ARF Armenian Cause Office) was appointed a member of the Republic of Armenia's State Commission on Coordination of Events for Commemoration of 100th Anniversary of Armenian Genocide. On December 28, 2018, for his "active role" in the commission's work, Manoyan was awarded the Medal of Movses Khorenatsi by Armenian President Serzh Sargsyan. On May 7, 2016, Manoyan was awarded the "Vachagan Barepasht" medal by president of the Artsakh Republic Bako Sahakyan, for the service rendered to the Artsakh Republic in his capacity as head of the ARF Armenian Cause Office.

Starting in December 2005, Manoyan has represented the ARF in several meetings of the Socialist International, including the meeting of the SI Committee for the CIS, Caucasus and Black Sea, held in Baku on 11–12 October 2010, and the SI Council meeting in Istanbul, on November 11–12, 2013.

Giro Manoyan, born in Beirut, Lebanon, in 1962, moved to Montreal, Quebec, Canada with his family in 1976. In 1999 he moved to Yerevan, Armenia.
