= The New Turkey =

2005 book by Chris Morris

- Granta book cover
- Author: Chris Morris
- Language: English
- Genre: Turkish Politics
- Publisher: Granta Books
- Publication date: 5 September 2005
- Publication place: United Kingdom
- Media type: Paperback
- Pages: 288 pages
- ISBN: 978-1-86207-865-9
- OCLC: 70765924

The New Turkey: The Quiet Revolution on the Edge of Europe is a 2005 Granta Books publication by BBC World Affairs Correspondent Chris Morris which examines the potential and the problems of the far-reaching political and economic reforms being undertaken in what the author describes as a second revolution in Turkey.

== Content ==
=== Introduction ===
Morris briefly outlines the sweeping democratic, legal and economic reforms rushed through by Turkish Prime Minister Tayyip Erdoğan of the Justice and Development Party (AKP) in the build-up to the European Union summit on December 17, 2004, which is described as one of the most important days in modern Turkish history, and concludes that the EU membership talks that began following the summit will draw the map of Europe for the 21st century.

=== Chapter 1: They've Got a Bit of History ===
Morris goes back through history to assess where the Turks came from, their imperial past, and their long and complex relationship with Europe concluding that modern Turks have unresolved feelings about the messy Ottoman era, which achieved its Golden Age under Süleyman the Magnificent, whose conquests instilled fear and loathing in the European psyche, before slowly degenerating into decadence and corruption, imbedded in the European psyche as a comic figure, with the infamous ‘capitulations’ to foreign powers, still a source suspicion for many Turks, and finally being swept away by Mustafa Kemal Atatürk in the aftermath of disastrous defeat in the First World War.

=== Chapter 2: ‘Devlet’: Atatürk and his Legacy ===
Morris states that a cult of personality (with an ideology, ‘Kemalism’, to match) has built up around the country's founder who he accuses Atatürk of establishing something close to a dictatorship as he pushed through a personal revolution of widespread reforms against the will of the uncomprehending majority that left the Turkish Armed Forces as the main defenders of an incomplete model with autocratic tendencies and democratic flaws but recent reforms to the 1982 constitution, written under military supervision following a bloody coup, mark a key turning point in the country's delicate balance of power with foot dragging bureaucrats rather than the generals now being the main opposition to democratisation.

=== Chapter 3: Islam and the Politics of Prayer ===
Morris postulates that political Islam was first used by Turkey's generals in the 1980s as a tool against communism but had subsequently been usurped by Islamist parties to win the support of the urban poor and concludes that Prime Minister Erdoğan has learnt from the mistakes of his deposed mentor Necmettin Erbakan, such as his nomination of the pro-Islamist parliamentary deputy Merve Kavakçı exiled after attempting to wear a headscarf to her swearing-in, and takes a more moderate approach allowing his party to captured the centre ground in Turkish politics that has been alienated by the elitist policies of the Kemalists.

=== Chapter 4: The Kurdish Question ===
Morris states that pressure from the EU and a public backlash against the authority's heavy-handed counter-insurgency against the violent Kurdish national liberation movement of the Kurdistan Workers' Party has resulted in the “world's largest nation without a state” receiving cultural rights in education and broadcasting, but, despite events such as the release of Kurdish politician Leyla Zana and her colleagues and the lifting of a 28-year ban on their language, their future is still far from secure and renewed violence after a five-year unilateral ceasefire that followed the 1999 trial of the movement's ruthless and opportunistic founder Abdullah Öcalan would soon commence.

=== Chapter 5: Open Wounds: The Greeks and the Armenians ===
Morris examines two of the country's other minority groups and their troubled legacy; a native Greek community of fewer than three thousand mostly poor and elderly who remained after the 1923-64 pogroms, have according to Morris, seen a rapid improvement in the attitudes that nearly led to war over the 1996 Imia-Kardak crisis changed with the “earthquake diplomacy” that followed the 1999 disaster, and the Armenian natives who have fared equally well in Istanbul but have all but died out in the country's eastern provinces where 1890–1915 ethnic cleansing by the Ottoman authorities remains one of the country's most sensitive taboos.

=== Chapter 6: Rights and Wrongs ===
Morris reports on pressure from both the EU and Turkish grassroots organisations, such as Flying Broom, that has resulted in reforms to the civil and penal codes for a range of human rights issues including attitudes to torture and extrajudicial execution, prison reform following controversial ‘death fasts’ by the Revolutionary People's Liberation Party–Front, legal protection for women and children in a country where polygamy is accepted and ‘honour’ killings are still a reality, and a more inclusive approach to the communities affected by the massive Southeastern Anatolia Project, but he concludes it will take a long time for the new thinking to percolate through the system.

=== Chapter 7: It's the Economy, Stupid ===
Morris recalls the economic crisis precipitated by the February 19, 2001, falling out between Prime Minister Ecevit and President Sezer that swept Tayyip Erdoğan to power in the 2002 election with a series of economic reforms based on a deal Turkish economist Kemal Derviş had agreed with the International Monetary Fund, including public spending cuts, increased foreign investment and the introduction of the new Turkish lira (worth one million old lira), that put an end to the cosy alliance of politicians, bureaucrats and businessmen who had carved up the spoils of the old boom and bust cycle between them for decades in a country where corruption is endemic.

=== Chapter 8: Euro-Turks and Europeans ===
Morris travels to Germany to contrast the modern success stories of Şahinler founder Kemal Şahin, MEP Cem Özdemir, Head-On director Fatih Akın and footballers Ümit Davala and Tayfun Korkut with the original generation of Gastarbeiter who failed to integrate and examine how Turkey directs this group to lobby for EU accession via the Presidency of Religious Affairs funded Turkish-Islamic Union for Religious Affairs (DITIB) but faces competition from more extremist elements such as Milli Görüş and Metin Kaplan’s Caliphate State which cause the likes of French Prime Minister Jean-Pierre Raffarin and Cardinal Joseph Ratzinger to question multicultural Europe.

=== Chapter 9: Crossroads ===
Morris examines the influence Turkey's unique geological location has left from the dark-side as a hub for the smuggling of drugs, weapons, people and terrorist activities that caused it to close its borders with its eastern neighbours for much of its modern history to the bright-side as a hub for the transport of oil, gas and even water that becomes apparent as rapprochement with those neighbours is reached by the current administration and the unrivalled wealth of archaeological finds buried in its soil by centuries of other administrations that have passed through.

=== Epilogue ===
Morris's epilogue, written in London in May 2006, brings the story up to date with the backlash against Turkish EU membership led by German Chancellor Angela Merkel and the subsequent resurgence of Turkish nationalism in response.

=== Further reading, viewing and listening ===
Morris gives a brief list of recommended books, films, music and websites for further study.

== Reviews ==
Andrew Finkel, writing in The Guardian, describes it as, "a new Turkish primer... which cuts a brisk and lucid way through the great themes of Turkish life today", in "a brave attempt to chart the challenges facing the EU's new applicant." Maureen Freely, writing in New Statesman, adds that "This is a lot to cover in 258 pages", and "The book moves at a pretty fast clip.... Yet, even as we trot along, struggling to keep up, we get a pretty clear idea of how the Turkish state developed, and where the people stand in relation to it."

Ross Leckie, writing in The Times, states that, "As a BBC reporter, Morris has travelled far and wide through Turkey", and Finkel adds that, "Morris is full of affection for his former beat... but he enjoys poking the scars left by the ancien régime." While Freely confirms that, "There is an eyewitness electricity to his prose, yet he never loses his capacity to see the story from the outside, and he refuses to let his affection for the country blunt his analysis of its problems." Leckie concludes that "He does not shirk intractable issues such as the Kurdish question, or the use of torture. He brings Turkey out to the light where, for good or ill, it needs to be."

Finkel adds that, "Morris has served in Brussels and is therefore better placed than most to answer the most complicated question of all: can a fast-evolving Turkey soft-land in 10 or 15 years' time inside a European Union whose institutions are also in a state of flux?" Freely confirms that, "This gives him the double perspective that the subject demands", and adds that "While he answers head-on every nagging question a Eurosceptic might ask, it is by showing how Turkey is moving to address these problems that he gives a sense of its dynamism." Finkel however concludes that, "This really is rocket science and, not surprisingly, Morris hedges a few bets." Although, "He is unequivocal, however, in believing that the prospect of EU membership has already prompted a 'quiet revolution on the edge of Europe'."

Leckie concludes that, "Morris covers the history well and draws important modern parallels", and, "Although let down by the often slight and breezy style beloved of some contemporary journalism, this is an important, challenging and timely book." While Freely states that Morris's compulsion, "to humanise the politics with real-life stories... is his greatest achievement, because any account of Turkey that does not give a strong sense of its people ends up giving only a strong sense of the overweening, overprivileged and often brutally oppressive state which rules them." Whilst, according to Freely, "Morris's central point is that the state has not kept pace with its people: what they were willing to accept 50 years ago, when their economy was closed and contact with the outside world was limited, is not what they want or expect today."

Freely, writing in September 2005, concludes that, "the picture today is not quite as bright as it was when Morris wrote his epilogue. Tayyip Erdogan, the reforming prime minister, looks much weaker than he did this time last year, while anti-EU nationalists inside Turkey have found perfect allies in the anti-Turkey nationalists of the EU. No one knows how the game will play itself out, but if you want to be able to follow it as it happens, there can be no better preparation than this splendid, astute and compassionate book."
