= Chris Morris (journalist) =

British broadcast journalist (born 1964)

- Born: 1964 (age 61–62)
- Occupation: Journalist
- Notable credit(s): Today; From Our Own Correspondent; The New Turkey

Chris Morris (born 1964) is a British broadcast journalist who regularly contributes to BBC News, Today, BBC Reality Check and From Our Own Correspondent, and is the author of the 2005 Granta publication The New Turkey.

== Biography ==
Morris joined the BBC World Service in 1988 and was BBC Sri Lanka Correspondent from 1990–92 based in Colombo covering the Sri Lankan civil war and other South Asian stories including the assassination of Rajiv Gandhi and the rise of Hindu nationalism.

He was BBC State Department Correspondent from 1994–97 based in Washington, D.C. covering crises in Haiti and North Korea, and travelling around the world with the US Secretary of State. He also reported on the Dayton Agreement and the 1996 United States presidential election.

He was BBC Turkey Correspondent from 1997–2001 based first in Ankara and later opening the BBC's new bureau in Istanbul covering the 1999 İzmit earthquake and the arrest and trial of the Kurdish rebel leader Abdullah Öcalan.

He was BBC Europe Correspondent from 2001–2005 based in Brussels covering Enlargement of the European Union, the proposed European constitution, and other European stories including the murder of the Swedish Minister for Foreign Affairs Anna Lindh and the 2004 Madrid train bombings.

During this period he also drew on his experience in Turkey to author The New Turkey which examines the potential and the problems of the far-reaching political and economic reforms being undertaken in what the author describes as a second revolution in Turkey and was published by Granta in 2005.

He was a BBC World Affairs Correspondent based in London from 2005 to 2007, reporting from conflict zones in Iraq, Israel and the Palestinian territories, and the Balkans.

In 2007 he became the BBC's South Asia Correspondent based in Delhi, covering India, Pakistan, Afghanistan and Sri Lanka, before returning to Brussels in 2011.

After returning to the UK, Morris began presenting Brexit: A Guide for the Perplexed on BBC Radio 4 in February 2017. Its third series was broadcast in February 2018.

Since November 2016 he writes and broadcasts on Brexit, fake news and other issues for BBC Reality Check.
