= Armenian written works of the Middle Ages =

This is a list of written works in the Armenian language during the Middle Ages (5th-15th centuries). Works in the Armenian language began appearing in the 5th century, following the invention of the Armenian alphabet. Many early surviving fragments and manuscripts are in Mekhitarist monasteries in Venice, Italy and Vienna, Austria. Some manuscripts are in Bzommar, Lebanon and in Jerusalem, Israel.

== Eznik Kolbatsi (Eznik of Kolb, also spelled as Eznik Kołbacʿi) ==
The Treatise on God was written by Eznik Kolbatsi.

=== Modern editions and translations ===
- Eznik of Kolb (1998). Blanchard, Monica J.; Young, Robin Darling (eds.). A Treatise On God. Corpus scriptorum Christianorum Orientalium Eastern Christian texts in translation. Louvain: Peeters Publishers. ISBN 978-90-429-0013-4.

=== Surviving fragments and manuscripts ===
The earliest manuscript attributed to Eznik of Kolb is dated to 1280 and is located in Yerevan, Armenia.

== Koriun (also spelled as Koriwn) ==
The Life of Mashtots is attributed to Koriun.

=== Modern editions and translations ===
- Korioun (1985). Maksoudian, Krikor H. (ed.). Vark' Mashtots'i [Life of Mashtots]. Classical Armenian text reprint series. Translated by Bedros Norehad (Facsimile ed.). Delmar (N.Y.): Caravan Books. ISBN 978-0-88206-030-9.
- Korioun (1994). Winkler, Gabriele (ed.). Koriwns Biographie des Mesrop Maštoc':: Übersetzung und Kommentar. Orientalia Christiana analecta (in German). Rome: Pontificio Istituto Orientale. ISBN 978-88-7210-298-5.
- Jean-Pierre Mahé, Koriwn, la Vie de Maštoc, traduction annotée (in French), 2005/07.
- Korioun (2022). Terian, Abraham (ed.). The Life of Mashtots' by his disciple Koriwn: Translated from the classical Armenian with Introduction and Commentary. Oxford early Christian texts. Oxford New York (N.Y.): Oxford University Press. ISBN 978-0-19-284741-6.

=== Surviving fragments and manuscripts ===
The earliest fragment is dated to the 12th century and is located in Paris, France.

=== Criticism ===
By the tenth century an abbreviated version of the manuscript incorporated information from other manuscripts later than Koriun himself and the earliest manuscript with the full text is dated to 1672. The textual transmission of over a thousand years included scribal errors, confusions, or misunderstandings to corrupt the text. Armenian literature has not come down in the precise form in which it was originally written and manuscripts were reedited long after they were composed.

== Agathangelos (also spelled as Agatʿangełos) ==
The History of the Armenians and the Teaching of Saint Gregory are attributed to "Agathangelos".

=== Modern editions and translations ===
- Agathangelos (1970). Thomson, Robert W. (ed.). The Teaching of Saint Gregory: An Early Armenian Catechism. Harvard Armenian texts and studies. Cambridge, Mass: Harvard University Press. ISBN 978-0-674-87038-3.
- Agathangelos (1976). Thomson, Robert W. (ed.). History of the Armenians (First ed.). Albany: State University of New York Press. ISBN 978-0-87395-323-8.
- Agathangelos (2010). Thomson, Robert W. (ed.). The Lives of Saint Gregory: the Armenian, Greek, Arabic, and Syriac versions of the History Attributed to Agathangelos. Ann Arbor (Mich.): Caravan Books. ISBN 978-0-88206-118-4.

=== Criticism ===
Agathangelos presents himself as an eyewitness to the events of the conversion of the Armenians to Christianity at the turn of the third to fourth century, claiming he was ordered by the Armenian king Trdat to write about the events. However, the History of the Armenians certainly was not written in the third to fourth century but shortly after the uprising in 450-451 by an anonymous Armenian writer. There are heavy borrowings from Koriwn's Life of Maštoc', making it very likely that the History originated in the circles around the Catholicos Sahak (387-439) and Maštoc' in the second half of the fifth century. The process of christianization is entirely attributed to St. Gregory, who was educated in Cappadocia before his missionary activities in Armenia and turned to Cappadocia for his consecration as bishop, despite the fact that Armenia's first missionaries did not come from the Greek communities in Cappadocia, but from Syria, particularly from the region around Edessa, making the History a tendentious narrative. There is terminology betraying close ties with the Irano-Syrian culture, but the History shows tendentious insistence on the connections of St. Gregory with Cappadocia despite the overwhelming traces of ties with Syria. Prior to the christianization of Armenia through Cappadocia, there must have been a strong missionary activity from Syria which has come down to only in obscure legendary reports. All of the recensions of Agathangelos (Syriac, Greek, Armenian, Arabic, Karšūni) have common derivation from the Greek translation, which was later translated back into Armenian because the original Armenian text is lost, and all have defective passages and corrupt readings. Armenian historians of this period generally have to be read with caution as very often they reflect the particular interests of the dominant political groups within the setting of Armenia, with the History of Agathangelos to be read as a part of the history of the house of the Arsacids. The particular interests of this dynasty was the close relationship with the Roman Empire. In contrast to the Armenian version of the History, the Syriac versions and the Epic Histories by P'awstos Buzandatsi reflect the Southern and older strain of Armenia's Christianity, with its close ties to Syria's principal center of religious activity, Edessa, despite Agathangelos's efforts to associate the conversion of Armenia with the Greek church of Cappadocia.

== Pavstos Buzandatsi ==
The Epic Histories (Buzandaran Patmutiwnk) are attributed to "Pavstos Buzandatsi", or "Faustus the Byzantine".

=== Modern editions and translations ===
- Faustus (1989). Garsoïan, Nina G. (ed.). The Epic Histories Attributed to P'awstos Buzand: Buzandaran Patmut'iwnk'. Harvard Armenian texts and studies. Cambridge, Mass: Harvard University Press. ISBN 978-0-674-25865-5.

=== Surviving fragments and manuscripts ===
The earliest fragment is dated to 1224 CE and is located in Venice and the earliest full manuscript is dated 1599 CE and is located in Jerusalem.

=== Criticism ===
The narrative of the Epic Histories is sometimes disfigured by interpolations drawn from the life of St. Basil of Caesarea which intrude into the text and confuse the chronology and is sometimes anachronistic, incoherent and shows signs of hasty, awkward compilation.

== Ghazar Parpetsi (Łazar of Parpʿi, also spelled as Łazar Pʿarpecʿi) ==
=== Modern editions and translations ===
- Parpetsi, Ghazar (1986). Kouymjian, Dickran (ed.). Lazar P'arpets'i: The Historian of the Wars of Vardan and Vahan Mamikonean
- Parpetsi, Ghazar (1991). Thomson, Robert W. (ed.). The History of Łazar P'arpec'i. Suren D. Fesjian academic publications. Atlanta, Ga: Scholars Press. ISBN 978-1-55540-579-3.

=== Surviving fragments and manuscripts ===
The earliest fragment is dated to the 10th-11th century and is located in Saint Petersburg, Russia.

== Elishe (also spelled as Ełišē, Eghishe, Yegishe) ==
=== Modern editions and translations ===
- Eġišê (1982). Thomson, Robert W. (ed.). History of Vardan and the Armenian War. Harvard Armenian texts and studies. Cambridge, Mass: Harvard University Press. ISBN 978-0-674-40335-2.

== Movses Khorenatsi (Moses of Khorene / Chorene, also spelled as Movsēs Xorenacʿi) ==
The History of the Armenians is attributed to Movses Khorenatsi.

=== Modern editions and translations ===
- Korenatsi, Movses (1978). Thomson, Robert W. (ed.). History of the Armenians. Harvard Armenian texts and studies. Cambridge, Mass.: Harvard University Press. ISBN 978-0-674-39571-8.
  - Moses of Khoren (2006). Thomson, Robert W. (ed.). History of the Armenians (Revised ed.). Ann Arbor (Mich.): Caravan Books. ISBN 978-0-88206-111-5.
- Khorène, Moise (1993). Mahé, Annie; Mahé, Jean-Pierre (eds.). Histoire de l'Arménie: Nouvelle traduction de l'arménien classique par Annie et Jean-Pierre Mahé (d'après Victor Langlois) avec une introduction et des notes. L'aube des peuples. Paris: Gallimard. ISBN 978-2-07-072904-3.

=== Surviving fragments and manuscripts ===
The earliest fragments of Movses's History are dated to 9th century (or earlier, in Venice), 9th-10th centuries (in Vienna), 10th-11th centuries (in Yerevan).

=== Criticism ===
Movses Khorenatsi claims to be writing in the late 5th century but Professor Cyrill Toumanoff dated this work to the latter part of the 8th century. Professor Nina Garsoïan dated this work to after 775 CE. Other scholars insisted on a late 5th century date of this work. The earliest full manuscript of Movses's History is dated to the 13th century but that edition was probably produced in the 11th-12th centuries, in the passage in Book II which relates the conversion of Constantine, the strange absence of the account of the conversion of Trdat has been noted. The passage concerning this event would have been eliminated from the original text of Khorenatsi in the 11th or 12th century. As the oldest manuscript of the work is from the 13th century, at the time of the Armenian kingdom of Cilicia and during the Crusades, the absence of the account was in promotion of the conclusion of an alliance with the Westerners on terms that were to be favorable to the Armenians.

Professor Robert Hewsen called Khorenatsi a compiler of legends, a distorter of fact, and inventor of tales, a plagiarizer of other people's work, which he does not hesitate to falsify. He called Book I, Genealogy of Greater Armenia "the legendary history of Armenia" as nothing in it is historical and what few facts it contains consist of information torn from their original context and woven into a fantasy, trying to link the Armenians to biblical history drawing freely upon the chronicle of Eusebius of Caesarea. He called Book II, The Intermediate Period "the garbled history of Armenia" filled with some genuine data there is a great deal of confusion and fantasy, with the effect of hanging a veil between the reader and what actually transpired in Amenia during this time. He called Book III, The Conclusion "the distorted history of Armenia" as it contains inadequate sources, faulty chronology, and deliberate bias and it is difficult to accept anything that is said.

== Tovma Artsruni (also spelled as T'ovma Artsruni) ==
The History of the House of Artsrunik was written by Tovma Artsruni.

=== Modern editions and translations ===
- Artsruni, Thomas (1985). Thomson, Robert W. (ed.). History of the House of the Artsrunikʻ. Byzantine texts in translation (in English and Armenian). Detroit: Wayne State University Press. ISBN 978-0-8143-1784-6.

== Movses Daskhurantsi / Kalankatuatsi (also spelled as Movsēs Dasxurancʿi / Kałankatuacʿi) ==
The History of the Caucasian Albanians was written by Movses Daskhurantsi also known as Kalankatuatsi.

=== Modern editions and translations ===
- Movses Daskhurantsi / Kalankatuatsi (1961). Dowsett, Charles J. F. (ed.) History of the Caucasian Albanians. ISBN 978-0-8357-6144-4
