= Agathangelos =

Reputed 5th-century Armenian historian

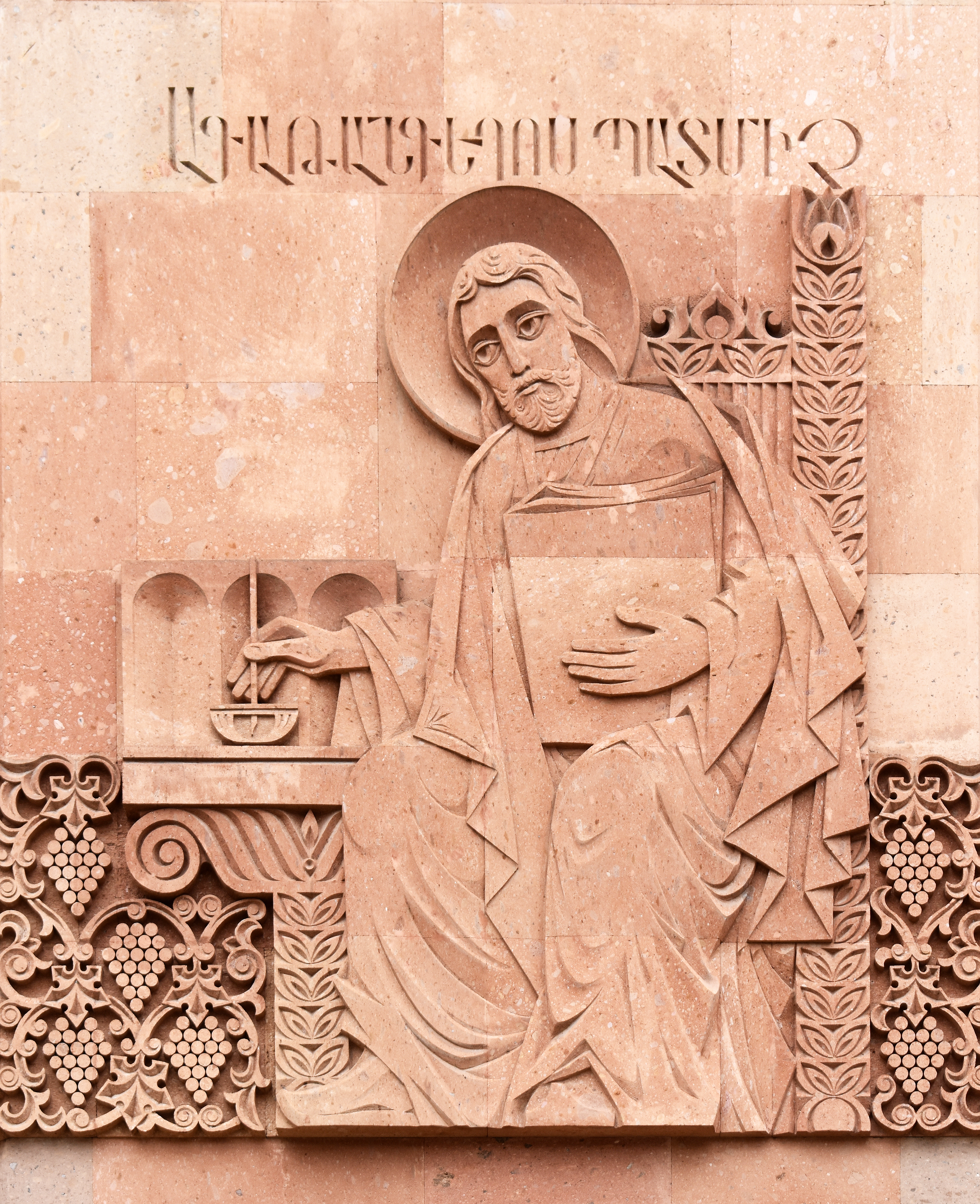
A relief of Agathangelos on the Armenian Cathedral of Moscow

Agathangelos (Old Armenian: Ագաթանգեղոս Agatʻangełos, from Greek Ἀγαθάγγελος 'bearer of good news'; c. 5th century AD) is the pseudonym of the author of a life of the first apostle of Armenia, Gregory the Illuminator, who died about 332. The history attributed to Agathangelos is the main source for the Christianization of Armenia in the early 4th century.

The "standard" version of Agathangelos' history accepted in the Armenian tradition dates to the second half of the 5th century. This version was soon translated into Greek; on the basis of this Greek translation, a translation into Arabic was made, as well as many secondary Greek, Latin and Ethiopic versions. Another, earlier Armenian version of the history, now lost, was the basis for two Greek, two Arabic, a Syriac and a Karshuni translation. The earliest surviving manuscript containing text from Agathangelos is a palimpsest kept in the Mekhitarist library in Vienna; the original text on the palimpsest dates to earlier than the 10th century. Other fragments are dated to the 10th and subsequent centuries. The earliest manuscripts containing the complete history of Agathangelos date to the 12th and 13th centuries.

He claims to be a secretary of Tiridates III, King of Armenia in the early 4th century, but the life was not written before the 5th century. It purports to exhibit the deeds and discourses of Gregory, and has reached us in Armenian, Greek, Georgian, Syriac, Ethiopic, Latin and Arabic. The text of this history has been considerably altered, but it has always been in high favor with the Armenians. Von Gutschmid maintains that the unknown author made use of a genuine life of St. Gregory and of the martyrdom of Saint Hripsime and her companions. Historical facts are intermingled in this life with legendary or uncertain additions, and the whole is woven into a certain unity by the narrator, who may have assumed his significant name from his quality of narrator of "the good news" of Armenia's conversion. It has been translated into several languages, and Greek and Latin translations are found in the Acta Sanctorum Bollandistarum, tome viii.

== Texts ==
Agathangelos is unique among Armenian texts for how widely it circulated outside of Armenia. The "standard" version of Agathangelos' history accepted in the Armenian tradition (called Aa by scholars) dates to the second half of the 5th century. This version was soon translated into Greek; on the basis of this Greek translation (called Ag), a translation into Arabic was made, as well as many secondary Greek, Latin and Ethiopic versions. Some of these derive from the full-length Greek Agathangelos, while others derive from the abridged version included in the menologium of the 10th-century author Symeon the Metaphrast. Symeon's abridgment was translated into Georgian, Italian (17th century), and Church Slavonic. There is also a Georgian fragment translated directly from the Armenian version. A brief life of Saint Gregory in Arabic may derive from an intermediary Coptic translation of the Greek Agathangelos. This group of texts, which all derive from the known Armenian version of Agathangelos, is provisionally known as the A recension (for Agathangeli Historia).

Another, earlier Armenian version of the history, now lost, was the basis for two Greek, two Arabic, and one Syriac translation; from the Syriac a Karshuni (Arabic in Syriac script) translation was also made. This group of texts, known as the V cycle (for Vita Gregorii) or Varkʻ ('saint's life' in Armenian), is less homogeneous than the other group. According to Gabriele Winkler, some of the texts draw from both the A and V recensions and should be considered separately. Robert W. Thomson writes: "The significance of these texts in the V cycle is that we now have evidence for traditions about Saint Gregory and the conversion of Armenia that are independent of the final Armenian redaction (Aa), and which are deliberately aimed at presenting a different interpretation of—or attitude towards—the dominant tradition in Armenian." Nikolai Marr first proposed that the texts of the V cycle came out of a Chalcedonian environment (the Armenian Church never accepted the definitions of the 451 Council of Chalcedon). Gérard Garitte cautiously accepted this conclusion, stating that it is probable (but not proved) that the V redaction was directed towards Armenians who remained in communion with the Byzantine Church.

The earliest surviving manuscript containing text from Agathangelos is a palimpsest kept in the Mekhitarist library in Vienna; the original text on the palimpsest dates to earlier than the 10th century. Other fragments are dated to the 10th and subsequent centuries. The earliest manuscripts containing the complete history of Agathangelos date to the 12th and 13th centuries.

== Identity and date ==
In the introduction, the author introduces himself as "Agathangelos from the great city of Rome, trained in the art of the ancients, proficient in Latin and Greek and not unskilled in literary composition." He states that he was called to the court of the Arsacid king of Armenia Tiridates III and ordered to write a history of the events of Tiridates' father Khosrov's reign and his own reign. Thus, it was accepted until the 19th century that Agathangelos was an author of the 4th century who was a contemporary of the events that he described. The Armenian historian Ghazar Parpetsi, writing c. 500, praises Agathangelos and gives a summary of his history, which he calls the Girk Grigorisi (Book of Gregory). Another early Armenian historian, Movses Khorenatsi (whose date is disputed), describes Agathangelos as the chartularius of Tiridates III (which, per Thomson, derives from the information in Agathangelos). The anonymous Primary History of Armenia also attributes to "Agathangelos the scribe" a Greek inscription listing the reigns of Armenian and Parthian kings; Thomson likewise considers this attribution fictitious, deriving from Agathangelos' reputation as a reliable scribe.

In the 19th century, scholars began to see problems with the 4th-century dating, such as the text's evident borrowings from the Life of Mashtots by Koriun, a 5th-century Armenian work on Mashtots, who created the Armenian alphabet. As Thomson writes, the name Agathangelos, meaning 'bearer of good news', is both fitting and suspicious for an author writing of the conversion of Armenia to Christianity. Additionally, false claims of being an eyewitness of events described are common in hagiographies, to which genre Agathangelos' work belongs. Alfred von Gutschmid concluded that the author was a 5th-century clergyman, and that the Greek version of Agathangelos was translated from the Armenian, not the other way around. However, Gutschmid believed that the author made use of a genuine life of Gregory the Illuminator and of the martyrdom of Saint Hripsime and her companions. This view is shared by Aram Ter-Ghevondian, who writes that the editor of the history of Agathangelos drew from 4th-century historical, epical, and martyrological materials for the work, and that the editor was a member of the circle of Mashtots' students. According to Stepan Melik-Bakhshian, the borrowings form Koriun are the work of a subsequent editor, who also removed many parts of the text that only survive in the V cycle. Thomson writes that the "Teaching of Saint Gregory", a theological text included in the history, probably dates to the early 6th century.

Thomson writes that there is no indication in Agathangelos that the original language of the book was Greek or Latin or that the Armenian text was a translation of an older text. A minority of scholars have taken the view that the Armenian work is a translation of an earlier Greek text: Norayr Biuzandatsi (writing in 1900), who thought that Koriun translated a 4th-century Greek Agathangelos into Armenian; and Albert Musheghyan, who put forward the view that a certain David of Rome (Davit Hrovmayetsi ), mentioned in a work titled History of the Hripsimeank as a secretary and chronicler of Tiridates III, was the true author of the history of Agathangelos, and that Agathangelos ('bearer of good news') was merely an epithet given to Gregory the Illuminator; in the 410s, per Musheghyan, the Armenian catholicos Isaac translated the work into Armenian, and by the end of the 5th century Agathangelos had been misinterpreted as the name of the author of the work. Artsruni Sahakyan also considers Agathangelos to have been an epithet of Gregory rather than the name of an author, but he argues that story of Gregory remained in oral form until the 5th century, when Mashtots and Koriun wrote the story down with Agathangelos as the name of the author.

== Content ==
=== Summary ===
The following is a summary of the surviving Armenian text. Certain major differences between the A and V groups are noted.

The history begins with the overthrow of the Parthian Arsacids in Iran by the Sasanian dynasty of Ardashir I in 224. The Armenian king (called Khosrov the Brave in the text) goes to war with the Sasanians to avenge his Arsacid kinsmen. Though successful, he is treacherously assassinated by Anak, a Parthian nobleman sent by the Sasanian ruler, who is now able to occupy Armenia. Anak's family is exterminated by the Armenian nobles in revenge for Khosrov's murder; only one child of Anak, Gregory, is saved and taken to Caesarea in Cappadocia, where he is raised as a Christian. At the same time, Khosrov's son Tiridates is taken to Rome, where he performs great feats. Eventually, the Roman emperor (unnamed but presumed in later Armenian tradition to be Diocletian, who appears later in the story) restores Tiridates to the Armenian throne. Gregory goes to Armenia at the same time. After he refuses to take part in the worship of the goddess Anahit, he is tortured. Tiridates discovers that Gregory is the son of his father's murderer and has him cast into the dungeon of Khor Virap.

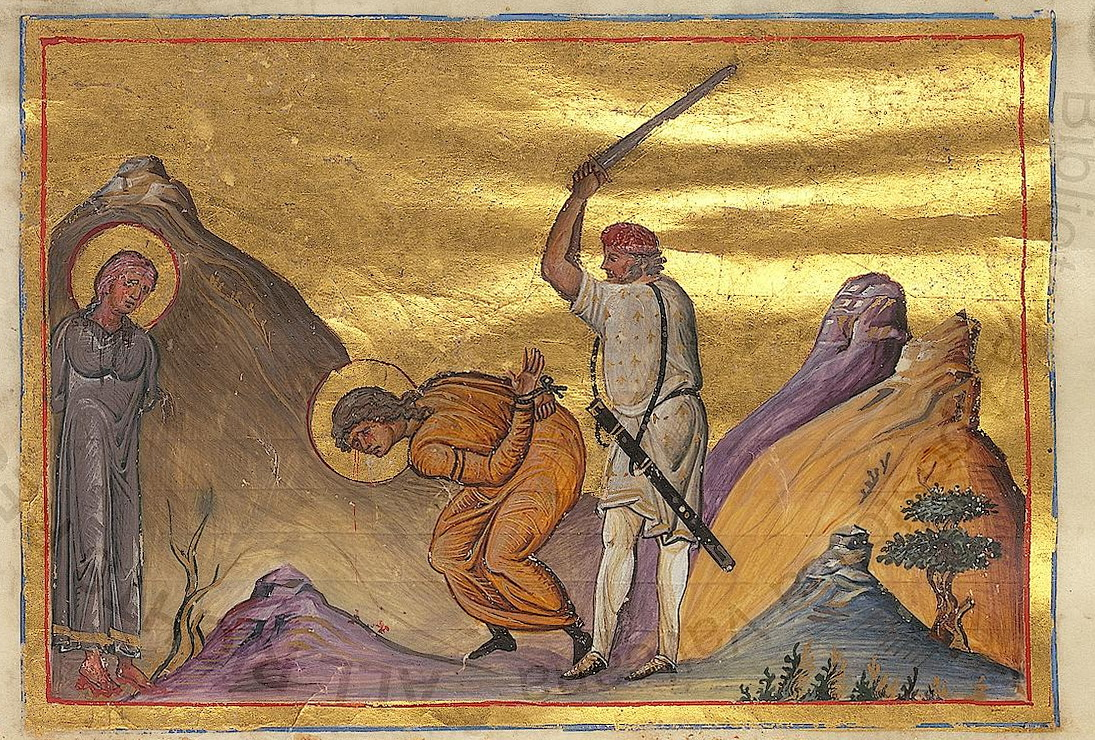
Miniature depicting the martyrdom of Hripsime and Gayane in the Menologion of Basil II

16th-century Armenian miniature depicting St. Gregory and King Trdat, transformed into a boar

In Rome, the emperor Diocletian searches for a wife and desires the Christian nun Hripsime. Hripsime and her fellow nuns, including the abbess Gayane, flee to Armenia. Diocletian writes to Tiridates asking for the return of the nuns but tells him he can keep Hripsime for himself if he so wishes. Hripsime is discovered, and although she miraculously manages to resist Tiridates' advances, she is subsequently put to death along with many of her companions. After the nuns' execution, the royal court is visited by torments and the king partially takes the form of a wild boar. Tiridates' sister, Khosrovidukht, sees a vision according to which the imprisoned Gregory is the only one who can cure the king. Gregrory, who is still alive after thirteen (or fifteen) years of imprisonment, is released. Tiridates is healed by his intercession, and the king and his court convert to Christianity. Gregory then gives a sixty-day to the Armenian court (this part of the text is known as the "Teaching of Saint Gregory").

Gregory sees a vision which indicates to him the spots in Vagharshapat where the shrines of the saints Hripsime and Gayane must be erected. Gregory is then sent to Caesarea, accompanied by Armenian nobles, where the archbishop Leontius consecrates him during a major church council. After returning to Armenia, Gregory baptizes the king and the Armenian people in the Euphrates, destroys the pre-Christian temples, and erects churches in their place across Armenia. (In the Greek and Arabic versions of the V cycle, the kings of neighboring Georgia, Lazica, and Albania are baptized alongside Tiridates, and Gregory also sends priests to those countries.) Gregory preaches in all parts of Armenia, establishing hundreds of bishoprics and founding schools where children, especially the children of former pagan priests, would learn of Christianity. Gregory is increasingly inclined towards an eremitic life of prayer, worrying the king. Gregory's sons Vrtanes and Aristakes are found and brought to Armenia, where the latter is consecrated bishop.

When news arrives of the conversion of the Roman emperor Constantine to Christianity, Tiridates, Gregory, Aristakes, and an entourage of nobles and soldiers go to Rome to greet the emperor and confirm the Armenian–Roman alliance. Later, Aristakes represents Armenia at the Council of Nicaea and brings back the Nicene canons, to which Gregory makes certain additions. The history ends with mentions of Gregory's preaching, although nothing is said about his death. (Only the Syriac and Karshuni translations of the V cycle recounts Gregory's death after thirty years of solitude in the cave of Mane; his body is discovered by shepherds, but the people of Daranali are unable to find it; years later, a monk sees in a vision where Gregory's body lay, and it is buried next to his children in Tordan.)

The Armenian text ends with an epilogue where Agathangelos introduces himself again and claims to have personally seen the events described in his work.

=== Layers ===
Agathangelos' history drew from materials of various origins, including the Life of Mashtots of Koriun, biblical and apocryphal translations, Syriac and Greek saints' lives, and patristics. Nevertheless, the work displays a stylistic unity. It is filled with biblical imagery and terminology and uses many of the usual motifs of hagiography. The section known as the "Teaching of Saint Gregory", which is longer than the entire rest of the text, displays considerable theological knowledge, including familiarity with the Catecheses of Cyril of Jerusalem, the Hexaemeron of Basil of Caesarea, John Chrysostom's biblical commentaries, and Ephrem the Syrian's homilies; all of these were translated early on from Greek and Syriac into Armenian. The direct borrowings from Koriun are extensive. The account of Gregory's missionary activities is based "almost verbatim" on Koriun's account of Mashtots' activities.

According to Nicholas Adontz, the main part of Agathangelos' history is the life of Gregory; to this the editor added the martyrology of Hripsime and her companions, the "Teaching of Saint Gregory", and Gregory's vision. Gregory's life is the most historical part, but some aspects of it are doubtful, and it is not a homogeneous whole. For example, the number of years that Gregory spent in Khor Virap is variously given as thirteen or fifteen. Gregory's and Tiridates' lives parallel each other in epic fashion: both are taken to Rome after their fathers are killed and both return to Armenia at the same time, committing themselves to the same cause. As for the martyrology of Hripsime and Gayane, it originally existed (in Adontz's view) as a separate story which was later combined with the story of Tiridates and Gregory and the conversion of Armenia. Thomson writes that the martyrdom of Hripsime and her companions must be "part of the oldest core of tradition in the History of Agathangelos, for the precise anniversaries of their deaths and the sites of their cult at Ejmiatsin are carefully recorded." Gregory's vision, which connects the saint with the cathedral of Vagharshapat, must derive from a tradition dating to later than 387, when Armenia was divided into Roman and Iranian spheres and Vagharshapat became the seat of the Armenian catholicoi. The account of Tiridates' and Gregory's visit to Rome is considered legendary, but Aristakes's participation in the Council of Nicaea is corroborated by an external source.

==== Iranian elements ====
A single Greek Agathangelos has a section about Ardashir I’s rebellion in the introduction; this section is thought to derive from the Middle Persian work Kar-Namag i Ardashir i Pabagan through an Armenian intermediary. Adontz believed that this section was present in the lost Armenian original, but Thomson writes that there is no indication that this episode from the Kar-Namag was ever connected with the Armenian Agathangelos. Adontz suggests further influences on the story of Khosrov and Tiridates from the Persian epic tradition, noting parallels between Gregory's father Anak and a figure in the Kar-Namag named Banak who helps Ardashir against the Parthian king. Nina Garsoïan argues that an Iranian substratum is observable in Agathangelos, particularly in the episode in which Hripsime overcomes Tiridates and the latter's partial transformation into a boar. The boar was the symbol of the Zoroastrian deity Verethragna, whose Armenian equivalent was Vahagn. Hripsime and Tiridates each personify their respective gods, with the former's triumph over the latter representing the victory of the Christian God over the pagan deity.

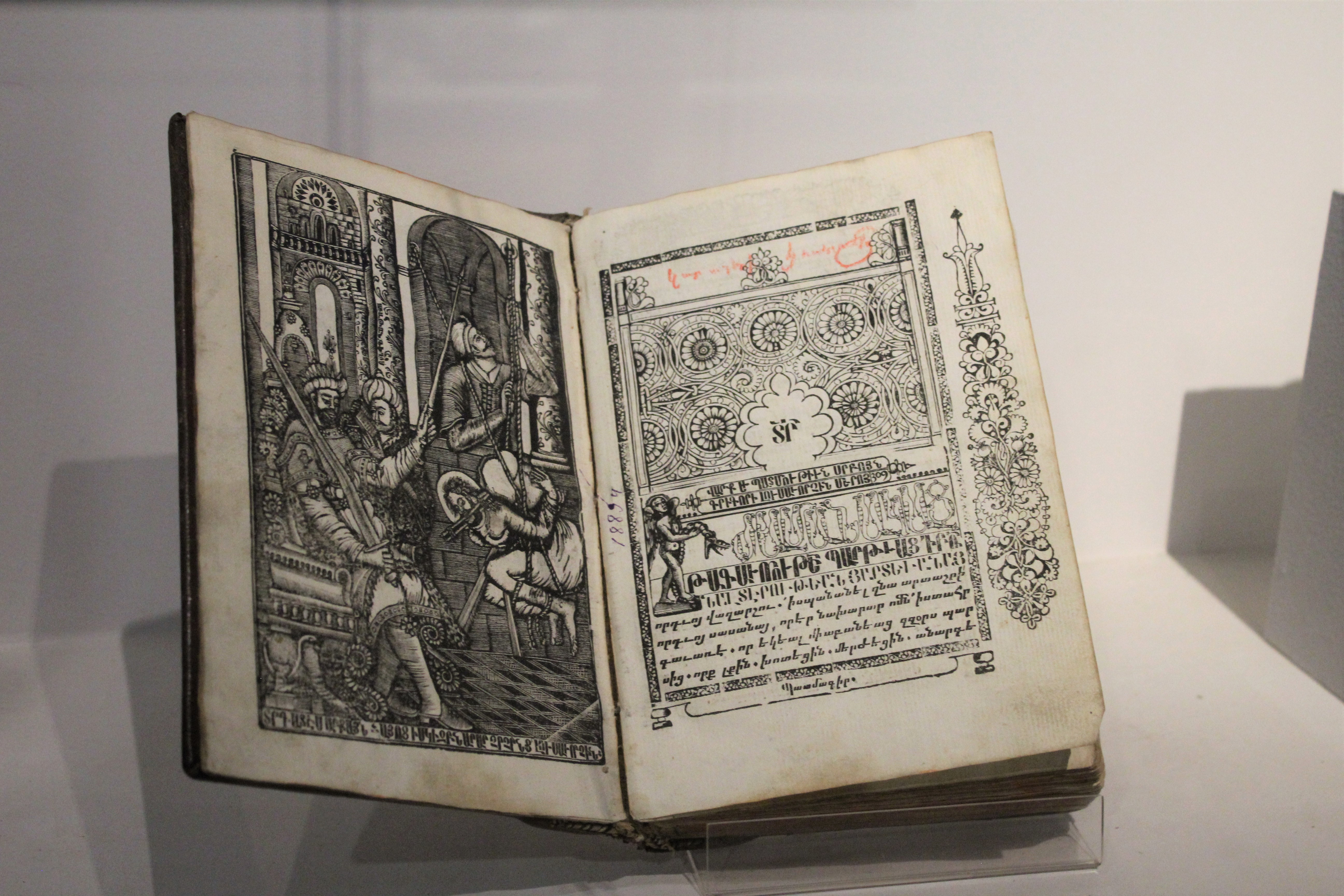
The 1709 edition of Agathangelos, with frontispiece depicting the torture of Gregory the Illuminator

== As a historical source ==
Thomson describes Agathangelos' history as "a fascinating mixture of fact and fiction" and "not of great value as a historical document" since its "authentic reminiscences of the bishop Gregory […] have been overlaid with elaborate inventions based on biblical and hagiographical motifs." The purpose of the work was to present Gregory not only as the first evangelist of Armenia but also as someone who preached and founded churches and bishoprics all over the country. To this end, the Armenian editor of the history transferred episodes from the biography of Mashtots to his own subject. The history depicts the spread of Christianity of Armenia as having occurred practically entirely within Gregory's lifetime, when, in fact, it was a more gradual process that met resistance. Additionally, the history compresses the events of a century, from the rise of the Sasanians in Iran (224) to the last years of Gregory the Illuminator (320s), into a single lifetime.

Melik-Bakhshian states that the different parts of Agathangelos of varying usefulness as historical sources. and that the work contains important information about Armenia's historical geography, its socio-political system, and the country's life in general. Agathangelos is the main source for the pre-Christian cults of Armenia, although it only gives the names of various sacred sites and the gods worshipped there and, per Thomson, does not preserve authentic details of cultic practices. Nina Garsoïan has cited the history as evidence of the persisting relevance of Iranian religious symbolism in early Christian Armenia. The greatest importance of the surviving Armenian version of Agathangelos for subsequent Armenian literature is that it acquired a canonical status, serving as the official account of Gregory's life; other stories preserved only in the Greek and Arabic versions were not adopted into the Armenian tradition. Some additional traditions recorded by Movses Khorenatsi were adopted, but he claimed to have gotten them from Agathangelos.

== Publications and modern translations ==
Agathangelos' history was published for the first time in Constantinople in 1709. Another edition, published in 1835 in Venice, was prepared with the comparison of several manuscripts. The critical text was published in Tiflis in 1909. Translations were made into Italian and French in the 19th century. Robert W. Thomson's English translation of the "Teaching of Saint Gregory" was published in 1970 (revised edition: 2001), and his translation of the rest of the history was published in 1976. A translation of the history into modern Eastern Armenian by Aram Ter-Ghevondian was first published 1977, and of the "Teaching", in 1977–78. A Russian translation by K. S. Ter-Davtian and Sen Arevshatian was published in 2004. A Persian translation by Garoun Sarkissian was published in 2001.

== Notes ==
=== Sources ===
- Adontz, Nikoghayos (2006). Erker Երկեր [Works] (PDF) (in Armenian). Vol. I. Erevani hamalsarani hratarakchʻutʻyun. ISBN 5-8084-0704-4.
- Agatangelos (2004). Istoriia Armenii История Армении (in Russian). Translation, commentary and introduction by K. S. Davtian and S. S. Arevshatian. Yerevan: Nairi. ISBN 5-550-01379-7.
- Agatʻangeghos (1983). Ter-Mkrtchian, G.; Kanayants, S. (eds.). Hayotsʻ patmutʻyun Հայոց Պատմություն [History of Armenia]. Translation into modern Armenian and notes by A. N. Ter-Ghevondian. Erevani hamalsarani hratarakchʻutʻyun.
- Agathangelos (1976). History of the Armenians. Translation, introduction and commentary by Robert W. Thomson (First ed.). Albany: State University of New York Press. ISBN 0-87395-323-1.
- Agathangelos (2001) [1st ed. published by Harvard University Press in 1970]. The Teaching of Saint Gregory. Translation, commentary and introduction by Robert W. Thomson (Revised ed.). New Rochelle, NY: St. Nersess Armenian Seminary. ISBN 1-885011-01-6.
- Āgātāngeghos (2001). Tārīkh-e Armaniyān تاريخ ارمنيان [History of the Armenians] (in Persian). Translated by Garoun Sarkissian. Tehran: Nāʼirī. ISBN 978-964-6479-36-4.
- Cross, F. L.; Livingstone, E. A., eds. (2005). "Agathangelos". The Oxford Dictionary of the Christian Church (3rd rev. ed.). Oxford University Press. ISBN 978-0-19-280290-3.
- Garitte, Gérard (1946). Documents pour l'étude du livre d'Agathange. Studi e Testi 127. Vatican City: Biblioteca Apostolica Vaticana.
- Garsoïan, Nina G. (1982). "The Iranian Substratum of the 'Agatʻangełos' Cycle". East of Byzantium: Syria and Armenia in the Formative Period. Washington, D.C.: Dumbarton Oaks Center for Byzantine Studies. pp. 151–174. ISBN 0884021041.
- Melik-Bakhshian, St. T. (1996) [Orig. published 1979]. Hayotsʻ patmutʻyan aghbyuragitutʻyun Հայոց պատմության աղբյուրագիտություն [Source study for Armenian history] (in Armenian) (3rd ed.). Erevani hamalsarani hratarakchʻutʻyun.
- Moses Khorenatsʻi (2006) [1st ed. published 1978 by Harvard University Press]. History of the Armenians. Translation and commentary by Robert W. Thomson (Revised ed.). Ann Arbor: Caravan Books. ISBN 978-0-88206-111-5.
- Musheghyan, Albert (2012). "«Agatʻangeghosi patmutʻyuně», steghtsman hangamankʻnerě, grutʻyan zhamanakě ev heghinaki hartsʻě" «Ագաթանգեղոսի պատմությունը», ստեղծման հանգամանքները, գրության ժամանակը և հեղինակի հարցը [The "History of Agathangelos", the circumstances of its creation, the time of its writing and the question of its author]. Patma-Banasirakan Handes (in Armenian) (1): 196–222. ISSN 0135-0536.
- Sahakyan, A. S. (2018). "Grigor Lusavorchʻi agatʻangeghosutʻyunitsʻ minchʻev «Agatʻageghay Patmutʻiwn Hayotsʻ»" Գրիգոր Լուսավորչի ագաթանգեղոսությունից մինչև «Ագաթանգեղայ Պատմութիւն Հայոց» [From Gregory the Illuminator's being Agathangelos to the "History of Armenia of Agathangelos"]. Lraber Hasarakakan Gitutyunneri (in Armenian) (3): 41–58. ISSN 0320-8117.
- Ter-Ghevondian, A. N. (1975). "Agatʻangeghosi khmbagrutʻyunneri hartsʻě ěst Khorenatsʻu tvyalneri" Ագաթանգեղոսի խմբագրությունների հարցը ըստ Խորենացու տվյալների [The problem of the recensions of Agathangelos according to Khorenatsi's data]. Patma-Banasirakan Handes (in Armenian) (4): 129–139.
- Thomson, Robert W. (2018). "Agathangelos". Brill Encyclopedia of Early Christianity Online. doi:10.1163/2589-7993_EECO_SIM_00000072.
- Thomson, R. W. (1984). "Agathangelos". In Yarshater, Ehsan (ed.). Encyclopædia Iranica. Vol. I/6: Afghanistan–Ahriman. London and New York: Routledge & Kegan Paul. pp. 607–608. ISBN 978-0-71009-095-9.
- Thomson, Robert W. (1991). "Agathangelos". In Kazhdan, Alexander (ed.). The Oxford Dictionary of Byzantium. Oxford and New York: Oxford University Press. ISBN 0-19-504652-8.
- Thomson, Robert W. (1994). "Agathangelos". In Greppin, John A. C. (ed.). Studies in Classical Armenian Literature. Delmar, New York: Caravan Books. pp. 15–26.
- Thomson, Robert W. (1997). "Armenian Literary Culture Through the Eleventh Century". In Hovannisian, Richard G. (ed.). The Armenian People from Ancient to Modern Times. Vol. 1. New York: St. Martin's Press. pp. 199–239. ISBN 0-312-10169-4.
- Redgate, A. E. (2000). The Armenians. Oxford: Blackwell. ISBN 0-631-22037-2.
- Winkler, G. (1980). "Our Present Knowledge of the History of Agat'angełos and its Oriental Versions". Revue des études arméniennes. 14: 125–141.
- This article incorporates text from a publication now in the public domain: Shahan, Thomas J. (1913). "Agathangelus". In Herbermann, Charles (ed.). Catholic Encyclopedia. New York: Robert Appleton Company.
- This article incorporates text from a publication now in the public domain: Chisholm, Hugh, ed. (1911). "Agathangelus". Encyclopædia Britannica. Vol. 1 (11th ed.). Cambridge University Press. p. 370.
