= Tuzluca District =

District of Iğdır Province, Turkey

- District
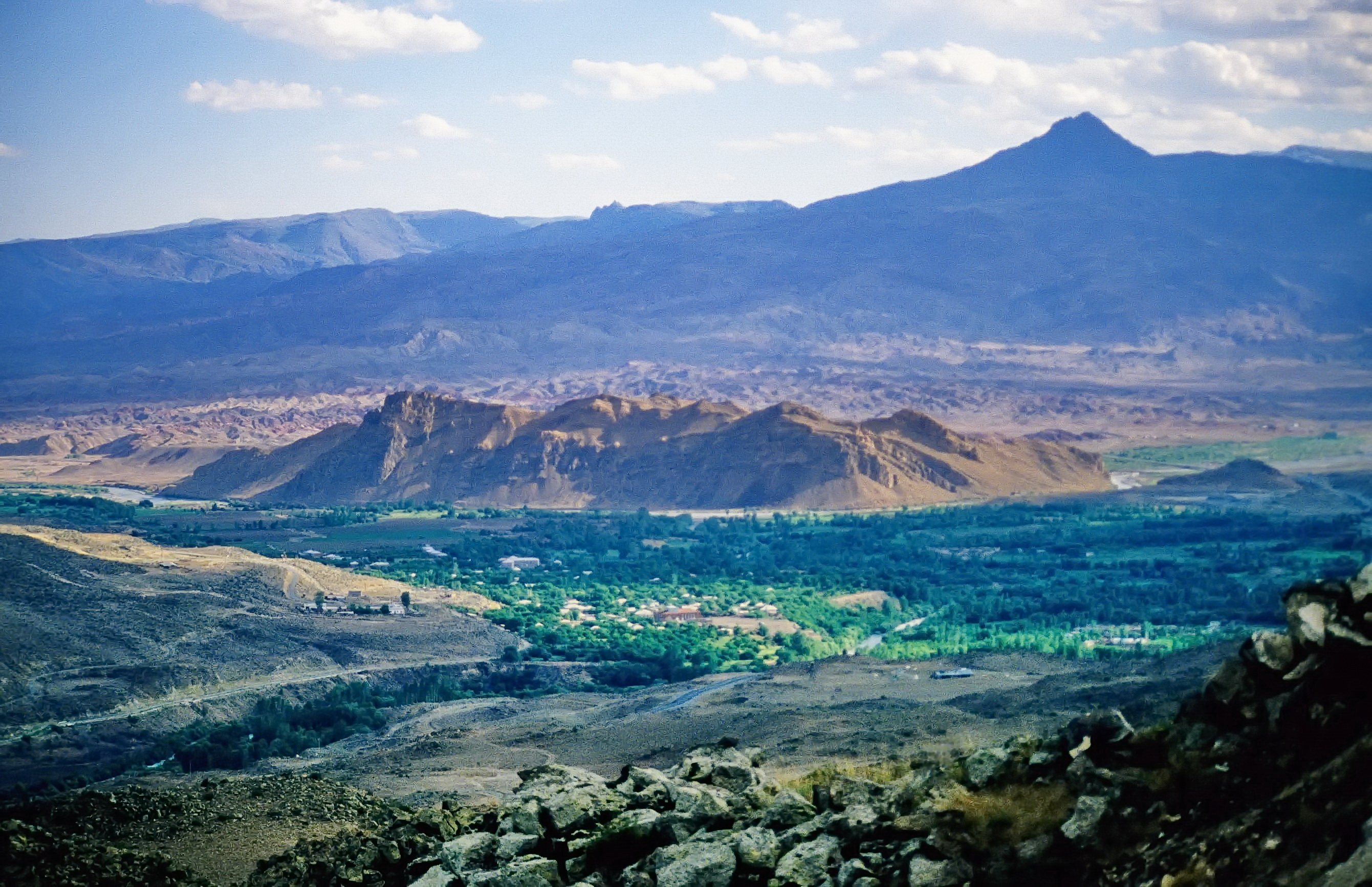
- confluence of Aras River and Arpa Stream, Tuzluca

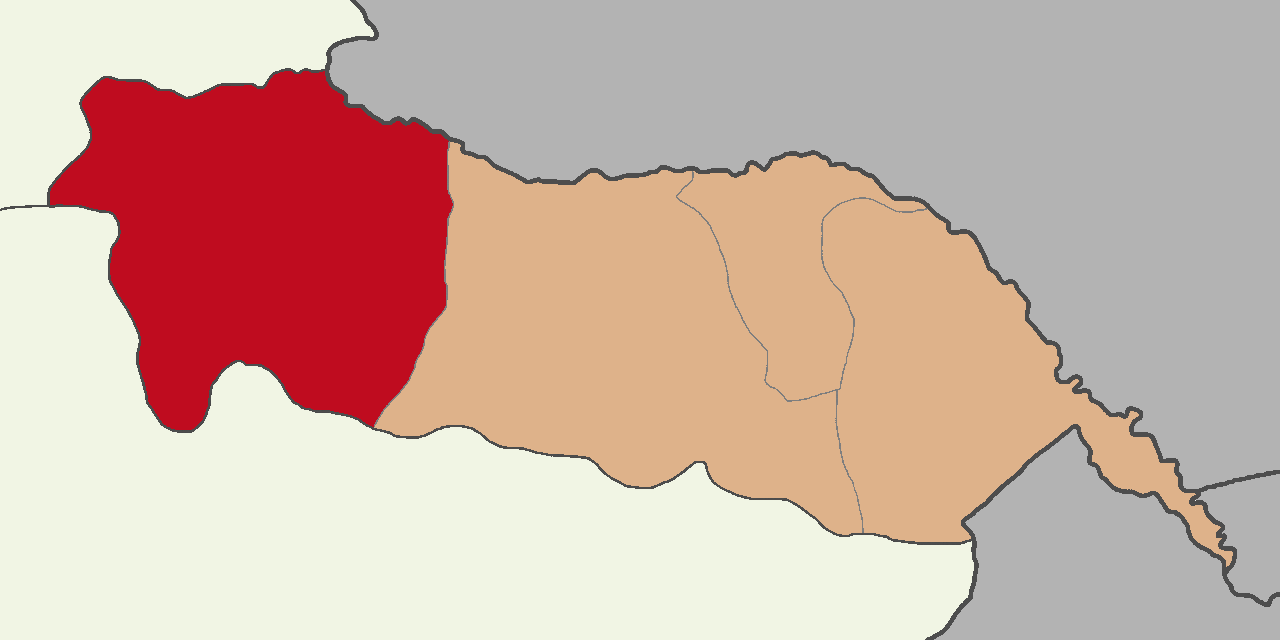
- Map showing Tuzluca District in Iğdır Province

- Location within Turkey
- Coordinates: 40°03′N 43°40′E
- Country: Turkey
- Province: Iğdır
- Seat: Tuzluca

Government
  - Kaymakam: Salih Çiğdem
- Area: 1,270 km^{2} (490 sq mi)
- Population (2022): 22,699
  - Density: 17.9/km^{2} (46.3/sq mi)
- Time zone: UTC+3 (TRT)
- Website: www.tuzluca.gov.tr

Tuzluca District is a district of the Iğdır Province of Turkey. Its seat is the town of Tuzluca. Its area is 1,270 km^{2}, and its population is 22,699 (2022). The northern portion of the district forms part of the international border between Turkey and Armenia.

== Composition ==
There is one municipality in Tuzluca District:

- Tuzluca

There are 81 villages in Tuzluca District:

- Abbasgöl
- Ağabey
- Akdeğirmen
- Akdiz
- Akoluk
- Alhanlı
- Aliköse
- Arslanlı
- Aşağıaktaş
- Aşağıcivanlı
- Aşağıçıyrıklı
- Aşağıkatırlı
- Aşağısutaşlı
- Badıllı
- Bağlan
- Bahçecik
- Bahçelimeydan
- Beyoğlu
- Bostanlı
- Buruksu
- Canderviş
- Çıraklı
- Çiçekli
- Doğanyurt
- Eğrekdere
- Elmalık
- Gaziler
- Gedikli
- Göktaş
- Güllüce
- Güzeldere
- Hadımlı
- Hamurkesen
- Hasankent
- İnce
- İncesu
- Kalaç
- Kamışlı
- Kandilli
- Karabulak
- Karacaören
- Karakoyun
- Karanlık
- Karataş
- Kayakışlak
- Kayaören
- Kazkoparan
- Kelekli
- Kılıçlı
- Kırkbulak
- Kıznefer
- Köprübaşı
- Küçükova
- Kula
- Kumbulak
- Kuruağaç
- Laleli
- Mollakamer
- Nahırkıran
- Ombulak
- Ortabucak
- Osmanköy
- Pirdemir
- Sarıabdal
- Sarıbulak
- Soğukbulak
- Söğütlü
- Sürmeli
- Taşuçan
- Tezekçi
- Turabi
- Tutak
- Üçkaya
- Uğruca
- Ünlendi
- Yağlı
- Yassıbulak
- Yaylacık
- Yüceotak
- Yukarıaktaş
- Yukarıcivanlı
