= Narratio de rebus Armeniae =

The Narratio de rebus Armeniae (Latin for "Account of Armenian Affairs") is a history of relations between the Armenian and Greek churches written around AD 700. It is not exclusively focused on ecclesiastical affairs and also touches on Armenian relations with the Roman Empire. It was originally written in Armenian, but the complete text is known only from a Greek translation, entitled Diegesis, made before the eleventh century, possibly as early as the eighth. Although there are later Armenian writers who cite the Armenian version, it is now lost.

The Narratio is written from a pro-Chalcedonian perspective out of step with the Miaphysite position adopted by the Armenian church and better aligned theologically with the Greek church. It covers the series of councils that caused the Armeno-Greek schism—Nicaea (325), Chalcedon (451) and Dvin (555)—and the various attempts to heal the rift in the sixth and seventh centuries. It ends on a note of failure. The Narratio itself, however, is evidence of the continuing existence of a Chalcedonian minority among Armenians into at least the eighth century.

In the ninth century, Arsenius the Great cited the Narratio in his account of the schism between the Armenians and his own Georgian church. The Greek text is preserved in four manuscripts, a fifteenth-century one now in Paris (BnF ms. Grec 900) and three in the Vatican Library (Gr. 1455; Ottob. gr. 77; Gr.1101) ranging in date from the thirteenth century to the sixteenth. The text was first published in 1648 by François Combefis, who gave it the Latin title by which it is now known.

== Bibliography ==
- Avdoyan, Levon (2018). "Narratio de Rebus Armeniae". In Nicholson, Oliver (ed.). The Oxford Dictionary of Late Antiquity, Volume 2: J–Z. Oxford: Oxford University Press. p. 1058. ISBN 978-0-19-881625-6.
- Booth, Phil (2013). Crisis of Empire: Doctrine and Dissent at the End of Late Antiquity. University of California Press.
- Garitte, Gérard, ed. (1952). La Narratio de rebus Armeniae: Édition critique et commentaire. Imprimerie Orientaliste L. Durbecq.
- Thomson, Robert W. (1991). "Narratio de Rebus Armeniae". In Kazhdan, Alexander (ed.). The Oxford Dictionary of Byzantium. Vol. 2. Oxford and New York: Oxford University Press. p. 1437. ISBN 0-19-504652-8.
- Thomson, Robert W., ed. (2010). The Lives of Saint Gregory: The Armenian, Greek, Arabic, and Syriac Versions of the History Attributed to Agathangelos. Caravan Books.
