= Tuzluca =

- Municipality
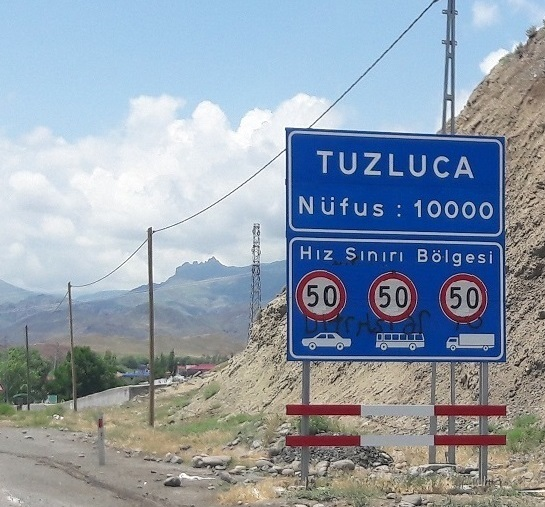

- Location within Turkey
- Coordinates: 40°02′58″N 43°39′39″E
- Country: Turkey
- Province: Iğdır
- District: Tuzluca

Government
  - Mayor: Cemal Kurnaz (CHP)
- Elevation: 870 m (2,850 ft)
- Population (2024): 22,564
- Time zone: UTC+3 (TRT)
- Postal code: 76900
- Area code: 0476
- Website: www.tuzluca.bel.tr

Tuzluca (Kurdish: Qulp; Armenian: Կողբ, romanized: Koghb; Russian: Кульп or Тузлуджа) is a town in the Iğdır Province in the Eastern Anatolia region of Turkey. It is the seat of Tuzluca District. Tuzluca was elected from the CHP in the 2024 Turkish Local Elections, with Cemal Kurnaz serving as the mayor. According to the 2024 population census, the district's total population is 22,564. It lies near the border with Armenia.

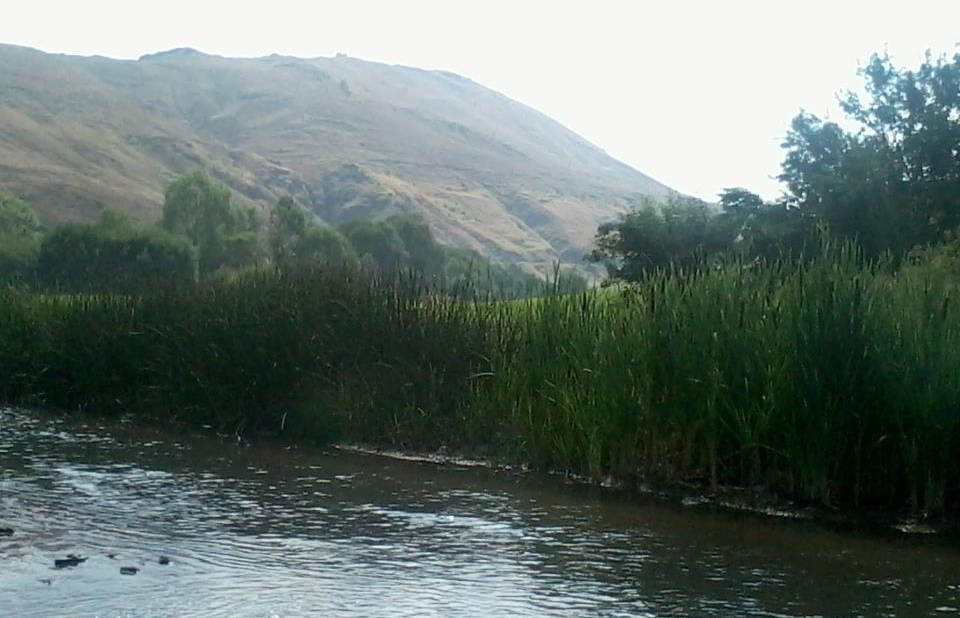
Tuzluca, Igdir

== Etymology ==
Tuz means salt in the Turkish language. The Turkish name Tuzluca is derived from the salt mines that have existed here since at least medieval times; a salt mine still operates.

== History ==
Known by Armenians as Koghb, Tuzluca was historically part of various Armenian kingdoms.

In 631, it was given by Byzantine Emperor Heraclius to Armenian Patriarch Ezra I in reward for his compliance at accepting the Byzantine position at the Council of Thedosioupolis.

The town and the surrounding area later became an Ottoman frontier Kurdish chiefdom and a scene of constant warfare between the Ottoman Empire and Persia. It was especially renowned for its salt mines.

In 1746, the region was finally ceded to Persia and became part of the Erivan Khanate. After the Russo-Persian War, 1826–1828 and Treaty of Turkmenchay, it passed from Persian to Russian control. Under Russian rule, the town, now known as Kulp, became part of the Surmalu uezd of the Armenian Oblast and later the Erivan Governorate. In 1829, shortly after the Russian annexation, Baltic German explorer Friedrich Parrot of the University of Dorpat (Tartu) travelled to Surmalu as part of his expedition to climb Mount Ararat. Two members of Parrot's expeditionary team, medical students Carl Schiemann and Maximilian Behaghel von Adlerskron, travelled to Kulp with four Cossacks to examine the salt mines.

After the Russian Revolution, Kulp came under the administration of the First Republic of Armenia in 1918. The town fell under Turkish occupation during the Turkish invasion of Armenia in 1920 and was formally ceded to Turkey by the Treaty of Moscow in March 1921, following Armenia's Sovietization. The cession was confirmed in the Treaty of Kars, signed in October of that same year. During the Kars negotiations, the Soviet side tried to secure "a concession on the salt-mining town of Koghb [Kulp], in Surmalu, for Soviet Armenia." However, the Turkish side rejected this proposal.

As part of the Turkish republic, Kulp was renamed Tuzluca. It was initially part of the Kars Province until the creation of the Iğdır Province in 1993. Today, Tuzluca serves as a highland retreat for asthma patients. Apricots and other fruit and vegetables are grown in the district.

== Government ==
In the local elections in March 2019 Ahmet Sair Sadrettin Türkan was elected mayor. In 2024 Turkish local elections, CHP candidate won with 30.64 percent of the votes, while the incumbent mayor gathered 28.27 percent of the votes. However, Supreme Election Council has awarded the mayorship to the incumbent mayor from AKP, deciding that CHP candidate was not qualified for elections. This decision caused protests in support of the elected mayor in the town.

== Population ==
Historical population
Year	Pop.	±% p.a.
1980	6,911	—
1985	8,104	+3.24%
1990	7,698	−1.02%
1997	10,652	+4.75%
2007	11,239	+0.54%
2012	9,177	−3.97%
2017	9,922	+1.57%
2022	9,619	−0.62%
Source: Population censuses (1980-1997) and TÜIK (2007-2022)

== Notable people ==
- Eznik of Kolb, writer (5th century)
- Mehmet Hakkı Suçin, Arabist and translation scholar
- Servet Çetin, soccer player
- Şamil Ayrım, member of the Grand National Assembly of Turkey

== Bibliography ==
- Parrot, Friedrich (2016) [1846]. Journey to Ararat. Translated by William Desborough Cooley. Introduction by Pietro A. Shakarian. London: Gomidas Institute. ISBN 978-1909382244.
- Sediyani, İbrahim (2009). Adını arayan coğrafya. Özedönüş Yayınları. ISBN 9786054296002.
- Shakarian, Pietro A. (2025). Anastas Mikoyan: An Armenian Reformer in Khrushchev's Kremlin. Bloomington: Indiana University Press. ISBN 978-0253073556.
- Tsutsiev, Arthur (2014). Atlas of the Ethno-Political History of the Caucasus (PDF). Translated by Nora Seligman Favorov. New Haven: Yale University Press. ISBN 9780300153088. Archived (PDF) from the original on 17 June 2023.
