= The Life of Mesrop Mashtots =

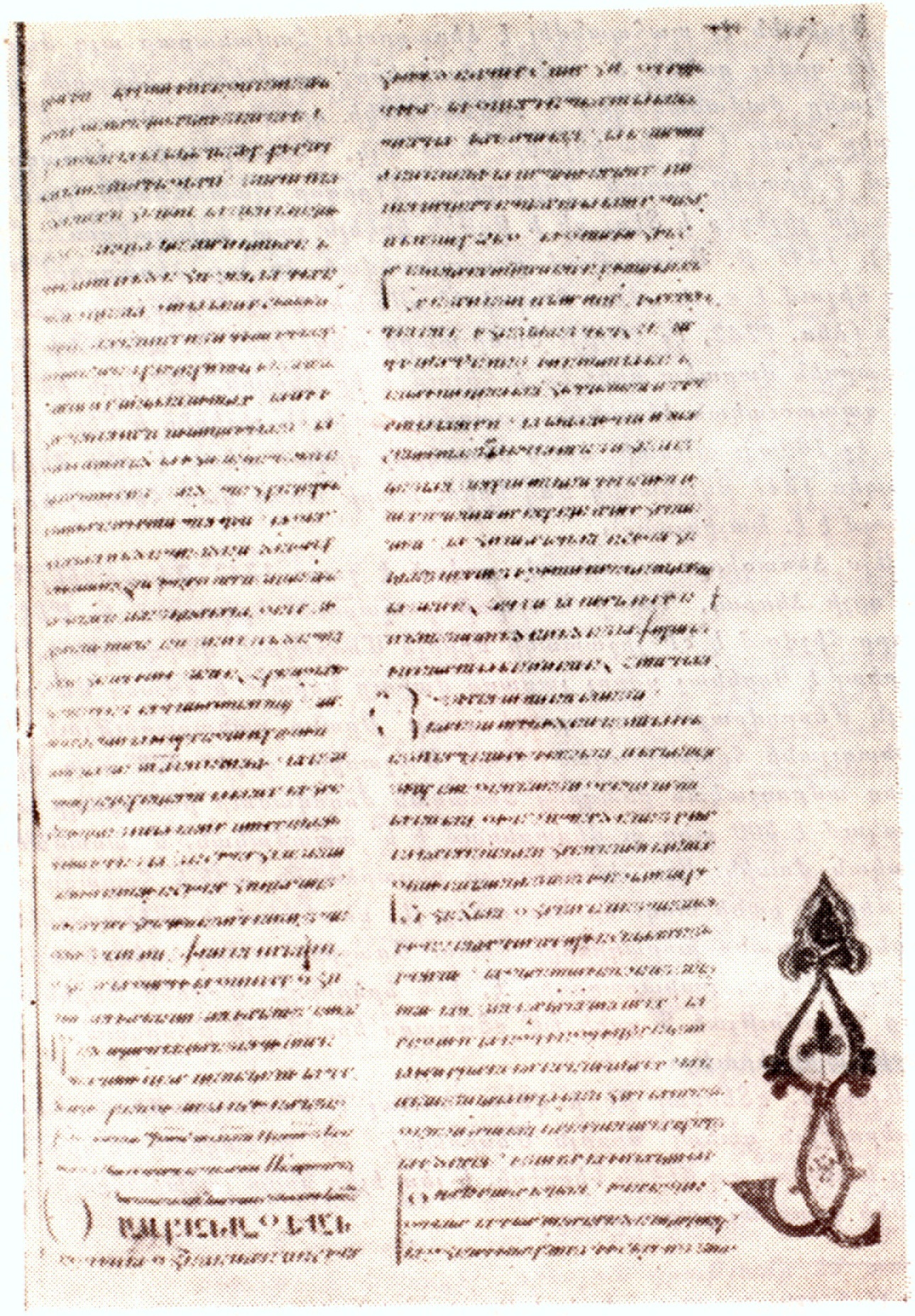

The Life of Mashtots (Armenian: Վարք Մաշտոցի, romanized: Vark’ Mashtots’i) is the only known work by the Armenian writer Koriun (Koriwn) (ca. 5th century C.E.) about the creator of the Armenian alphabet Mesrop Mashtots. There is almost no information available about the life and works of Koriun (his name means "whelp" or "cub" in Armenian) and he refers to himself as Mesrop Mashtots's and Catholicos Sahak's "assistant and associate... in their spiritual works".

Works written in the Armenian script in the 5-8th centuries C.E. are attributed to Eznik Kolbatsi (Eznik Kołbacʿi, Eznik of Kołb), Koriun (Koriwn), Agathangelos (Agatʿangełos), Pavstos Buzandatsi (Pʿawstos Buzandacʿi), Lazar (Ghazar) Parpetsi (Łazar Pʿarpecʿi, Łazar of Parpʿi), Elishe (Ełišē, Eghishe, Yegishe), Movses Khorenatsi (Movsēs Xorenacʿi, Movses of Khoren), Lewond (Łewond, Ghewond) and Sebeos (Sebēos).

It is the earliest known original work written in Armenian and other scholars place it after Agathangelos - The Lives of Saint Gregory. According to Armenian tradition, the Georgian script was also developed by Mashtots and his students based on the report of Koriun in The Life of Mashtots and Movses Khorenatsi in History of the Armenians, on which the other Armenian sources depend: Hovhannes Draskhanakerttsi (Catholicos of Armenia from 897 to 925) - History of the Armenians, Movses Kaghankatvatsi/Daskhurantsi - The History of the Country of Albania, Kirakos Gandzaketsi - History of the Armenians. It is also possible to think of an early interpolation of Koriun's chapters on the creation of the Georgian alphabet by Mashtots because Koriwn's Life is not always entirely trustworthy. It may be that Koriun's reporting here is either biased, or at least inaccurate and has less to do with the events of that time than with the Armenian Church's claim to leadership in church affairs, whereby Koriun implicitly expresses the dependence of the Georgian church leadership on Armenia, there is absence of any trace of the people and events in other sources.

== History ==
The oldest existing fragments of the incomplete manuscript are in the 643-page Vitae Sanctorum manuscript (Arm. 178, folios 467-472) dated to the 12th century, which are kept in Paris's Bibliothèque nationale and were copied by the scribe Poghos. Two shorter versions are dated the middle of the 14th century and are in the Matenadaran (M 3787 and M 3797) and one longer version is dated the late 17th century. All earlier writers called the inventor of the Armenian alphabet Mashtots' and the name Mesrop is not found in other authors until the 8th century.

Modern writers call him Mesrop Maštocʿ but he is known by two separate names Mesrop and Maštocʿ and a widely held view is that his true name was Maštocʿ and the name Mesrop was invented 300 years after his death. It is argued that Mesrop was his true name and Maštocʿ was a surname given to him because of the order of hermits which he instituted. According to the available texts of Koriun and Lazar Parpetsi his name was Maštocʿ sometimes written variously as Maštʿocʿ, Maštocʿ or Maždocʿ and Movses Khorenatsi referred to him both as Maštocʿ and Mesrop sometimes written variously as Mastrovb, Mesrob, Mesrovb or Masrovp. The title Life of Mashtots (Varkʿ Mashtotsʿi) is a hypothetical original while the title Life of Mesrop (Varkʿ Mesropi) is found in all of the manuscripts. All of Koriun's manuscripts have Mesrop in the title and not Mashtots and oldest manuscript fragment of Lazar Parpetsi's History of the Armenians (10-12th century) calls him Mesrop throughout. Maštocʿ in the titles are the editors's emendations, all of the manuscripts have Mesrop.
