= Şamil Ayrım =

Turkish politician (born 1950)

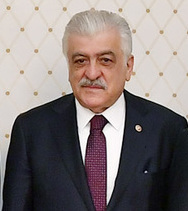
Şamil Ayrım

Şamil Ayrım (born 1950 in Tuzluca, Iğdır, Turkey) is a Turkish politician and member of Turkish Parliament. He is a member of Justice and development party in Turkey and deputy for Istanbul

He is ethnically Azerbaijani and is related to Cihangirzade İbrahim Bey.
