= Kumbulak =

- Village
- Location within Turkey
- Coordinates: 39°57′40″N 43°32′11″E
- Country: Turkey
- Province: Iğdır
- District: Tuzluca
- Elevation: 2,104 m (6,903 ft)
- Population (2022): 34
- Time zone: UTC+3 (TRT)

Kumbulak is a village in the Tuzluca District of the Iğdır Province in Turkey. Its population is 34 (2022). The village is populated by Azerbaijanis.
