= Koriun =

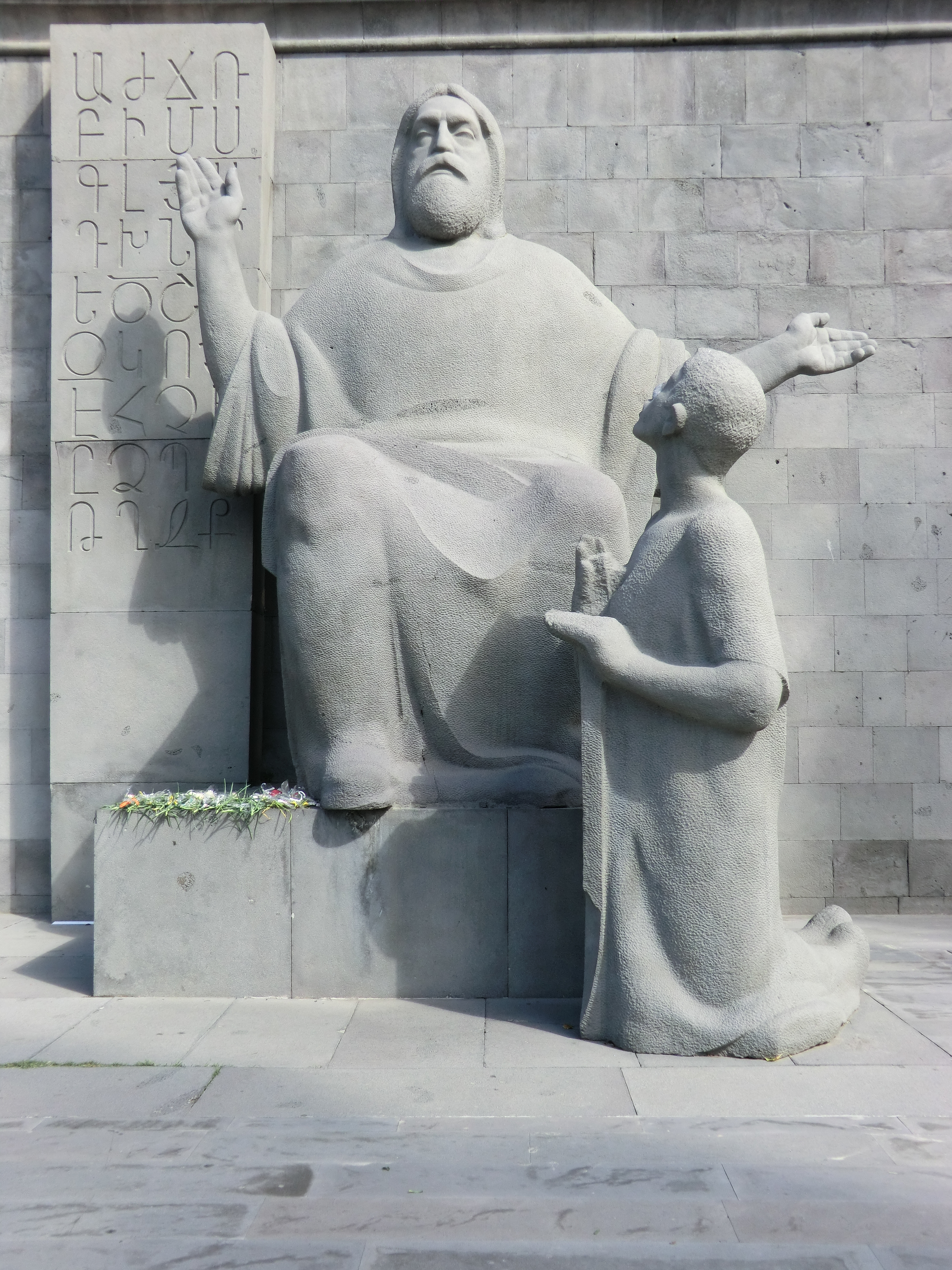
A 1962 statue of Mashtots (seated) and Koriun (kneeling) by Ghukas Chubaryan in front of the Matenadaran in Yerevan.

Koriun (Old Armenian: Կորիւն; (Note: Reformed orthography spelling: Կորյուն) also transliterated as Koriwn, Koryun, Coriun) was a fifth-century Armenian author and translator. He was the youngest student of Mesrop Mashtots, the inventor of the Armenian alphabet. His sole known work is the Life of Mashtots (Vark’ Mashtots’i), a biography of his teacher, which is the earliest known original work written in Armenian. The work gives information about Mashtots's invention of the Armenian alphabet, his preaching activities, and the efforts to translate the Bible and other Christian texts into Armenia, in which Koriun personally participated.

== Biography ==
The dates of Koriun's birth and death are not precisely known. It is assumed that he was born around 380 or 390 and died in 447 or c. 450. The name Koriun means 'lion's cub' (or the cub of any wild animal) in Armenian. Abraham Terian writes that the name suggests that Koriun was born in the eastern part of Armenia rather than the western, Roman-controlled part; or else his name would be the Greek-derived equivalent Łewond (Leontios). Some Armenian and European scholars, such as Ghevont Alishan, Hovhannes Torosian, Garnik Fndklian, Arakel Sarukhan, Galust Ter-Mkrtchian, Simon Weber and others, have speculated that Koriun could have been Iberian-Armenian or Iberian (Georgian). This is chiefly based on a passage in which Koriun appears to state that he was one of the Georgian youths brought to study under Mashtots and that he was subsequently made a bishop at the Iberian royal court. (Note: Additional arguments are put forward by Fndklian in Koriwn 1930, summarized and responded to in Koriun 1963, introduction.) However, Manuk Abeghian, following Norayr Byuzandatsi's correction, argues that this is a misunderstanding caused by a textual corruption. Concurring with Abeghian, Abraham Terian adds that "Koriwn’s Armenian identity is absolutely clear, declared in his opening line and seen in his sustained enthusiasm throughout the book".

Koriun was one of the disciples assembled in Vagharshapat in 406 to be trained as preachers of the Bible in Armenian after the creation of the Armenian alphabet by Mesrop Mashtots. He writes of himself that he was the youngest (Note: Old Armenian: krtseragoyn; this may also mean 'younger' or, figuratively, 'more humble' or 'least qualified'. Such self-effacing statements are common in Classical literature.) among Mashtots's pupils. Koriun and the other disciples were sent as teachers to various parts of Armenia. In 429, Koriun went to Constantinople with another student, Lewondes, joining another group of Armenians including Eznik of Kolb (Note: Eznik is the author of an apologetic work conventionally titled Refutation of the Sects. Koriun writes that he "embraced [Eznik] like a most intimate sibling [ëntanegoyn snndakits’]," which leads Abeghian to conclude that the two were childhood friends who had grown up together.) who were there to master the Greek language. They returned to Armenia after 431, bringing with them Greek manuscripts for the revision of the Armenian translation of the Bible, as well as the canons of the ecumenical councils of Nicaea (325) and Ephesus (431). While it is known that Koriun participated in the translation of Christian texts (the books of the Bible, patristics, and the canons of the ecumenical councils) into Armenian, he gives no specific information about his contributions to the translation movement. He must have been a well-regarded student of Mashtots, since he was encouraged to write the biography of his late teacher by Mashtots's other pupils, including Yovsep Holotsmetsi, the locum tenens of the Catholicos (head of the Armenian Church).

== Work ==
Koriun's Life of Mashtots (Vark’ Mashtots’i) is the earliest known original work written in Armenian. Koriun began work on the Life sometime after Mashtots's death in 440. It must have been completed in or after 443 and before 451. In Terian's view, the work was probably composed in 443 for the occasion of the third anniversary of Mashtots's death. Thus, it was composed as an encomium initially intended to be read out loud. While the work contains important historical information, it was not intended as a work of history and leaves out key events that would have been known by the immediate audience. It is the primary source for the beginning of Armenian literary activity and its chief figures. It was highly influential upon subsequent Armenian authors and was borrowed from heavily.

Koriwn's Life of Mashtots has been published multiple times since 1833 and has been translated into German, French, English, Russian, Italian, and Georgian. In the seventeenth century, Voskan Yerevantsi translated the short version of Koriun's Life into Latin, which remains in manuscript form. Several other works are also attributed to Koriun, but these cannot be verified as his. He is also credited with translating the Book of Maccabees into Armenian.

== Manuscript history ==
The longer version of Koriun's Life of Mashtots is preserved in a single manuscript dated to the late seventeenth century. Two shorter versions of the Life are dated to the middle of the fourteenth century and are kept in the Matenadaran (M 3787 and M 3797). The oldest manuscript of the Life is in Paris's Bibliothèque nationale (Arm. 178), a manuscript from the twelfth century.

== Sources ==
- Acharian, Hrachia (1973). Hayeren armatakan baṛaran Հայերեն արմատական բառարան [Armenian Etymological Dictionary] (in Armenian). Vol. 2 (Reprint of the 1926–1935 seven-volume ed.). Erevani hamalsarani hratarakchʻutʻyun. pp. 648–649.
- Ananian, P. P. (1966). "Oskan vardapeti latinerēn tʻargmanutʻiwne Koriwni «Varkʻ S. Mesropay» hamaṛōt patmutʻean" Ոսկան վարդապետի լատիներէն թարգմանութիւնը Կորիւնի «Վարք Ս. Մեսրոպայ» համառօտ պատմութեան [Vardapet Voskan's Latin translation of Koriun's short history 'Life of Saint Mesrop'] (PDF). Bazmavēp (in Armenian and Italian) (11–12): 273–276.
- Bozoyan, Azat [in Armenian] (2005). "Koryuni evs mek nor verěntʻertsʻumě" Կորյունի ևս մեկ նոր վերընթերցումը [Another rereading of Koryun]. Etchmiadzin (in Armenian). 61 (5): 153–159.
- Gaprindashvili, Khatuna (2019). K'oriunis "masht'otsis tskhovreba" (t'ekst'is targmna, gamok'vleva da k'oment'arebi) კორიუნის "მაშტოცის ცხოვრება" (ტექსტის თარგმნა, გამოკვლევა და კომენტარები) [Koriun's "The Life of Mashtots" (translation of text, study, and commentary)] (PhD thesis) (in Georgian). Tbilisi State University.
- Koriun (1963). Zhitie Mashtotsa Житие Маштоца [Life of Mashtots] (in Russian). Translation, introduction and commentary by Sh. V. Smbatian and K. A. Melik-Ogandzhanian. Erevan: Aĭpetrat. OCLC 8951428.
- Koriwn (1998). Ananian, Boghos (ed.). Varkʻ Mashtotsʻi Վարք Մաշտոցի (in Armenian and Italian). Venice: Mkhitʻarean tparan.
- Koriwn (1930). Fntglean [Fndklian], Garnik (ed.). Varkʻ Mashtʻotsʻi Վարք Մաշթոցի [sic] [Life of Mashtots] (in Armenian). Jerusalem: Tparan Srbotsʻ Hakobeantsʻ. OCLC 26069687.
- Koriwn (23 February 2023). The Life of Mashtotsʻ by his Disciple Koriwn. Translation, introduction and commentary by Abraham Terian. Oxford University Press. ISBN 978-0-19-284741-6.
- Koryun (1994). Matevosyan, Artashes (ed.). Varkʻ Mesrop Mashtotsʻi Վարք Մեսրոպ Մաշտոցի [Life of Mashtots] (in Armenian). With 1941 introduction and translation into modern Armenian by Manuk Abeghian. Yerevan: Hayastan.
- La Porta, Sergio (2018). "Koriwn". In Nicholson, Oliver (ed.). The Oxford Dictionary of Late Antiquity. Oxford: Oxford University Press. ISBN 978-0-19-866277-8.
- Maksoudian, Krikor H. (1994) [Chapter first published in 1985]. "Koriwn". In John A. C., Greppin (ed.). Studies in Classical Armenian Literature. Delmar, New York: Caravan Books. pp. 101–127. ISBN 0-88206-080-5.
- Martirosyan, Artashes (2002). "Koryun" Կորյուն. In Ayvazyan, Hovhannes (ed.). Kʻristonya Hayastan hanragitaran Քրիստոնյան Հայաստան հանրագիտարան [Christian Armenia encyclopedia] (PDF) (in Armenian). Yerevan: Haykakan Hanragitaran hratarakchʻutʻyun. pp. 510–511. ISBN 978-5-89-700016-6.
- Yuzbashyan, Karen; Muradyan, Paruyr (2003). "Koriwn ew Mashtotsʻi Varkʻě" Կորիւն եւ Մաշտոցի Վարքը. Matenagirkʻ Hayotsʻ Մատենագիրք Հայոց (PDF) (in Armenian). Vol. 1. Antelias: Metsi Tann Kilikioy Katʻoghikosutʻiwn. pp. 227–228.
