= Eznik of Kolb =

Fifth-century Armenian Christian writer

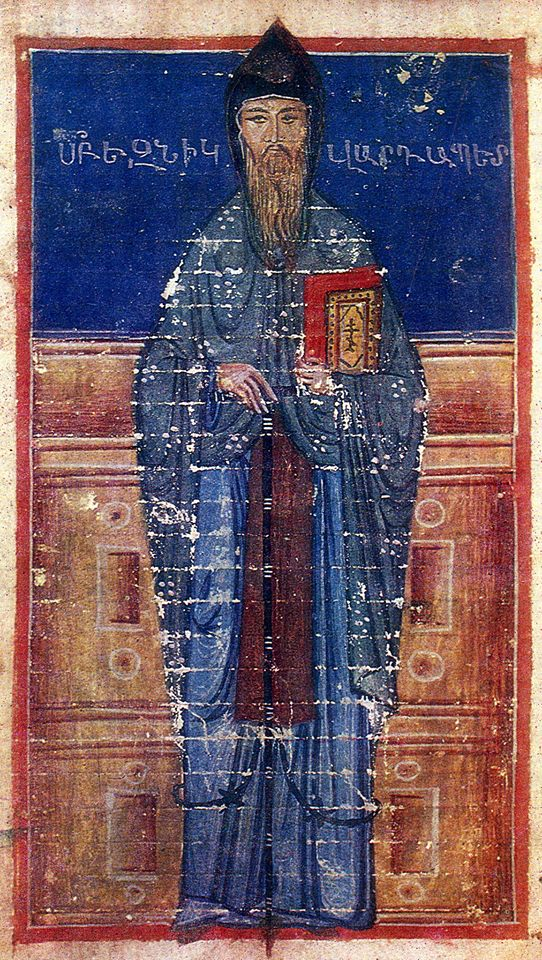
14th-century miniature depicting Eznik of Kolb

Eznik of Kolb (Old Armenian: Եզնիկ Կողբացի, romanized: Eznik Kołbacʻi; (Note: Romanization from modern Eastern Armenian: Yeznik Koghbats’i pronounced [jɛzˈnik koʁbɑˈt͡sʰi]) c. 380 – 450) was an Armenian Christian writer of the 5th century. He was one of the students of Mesrop Mashtots, the inventor of the Armenian alphabet. His only surviving work is an untitled treatise which refutes various religious and philosophical ideas. Scholars refer to this work as Refutation of the Sects or On God. Travelling to Edessa and Constantinople, Eznik participated in the translation of the Bible and other Christian literature from Greek and Syriac into Armenian. He is believed to be identical with a bishop of Bagrevand named Eznik.

== Biography ==
Eznik was born in approximately 380 in Kolb (modern-day Tuzluca, Turkey) in the district of Chakatk in the province of Ayrarat, in northern Greater Armenia. He was a pupil of Catholicos Isaac the Great of Armenia and of Mesrop Mashtots, who were undertaking the creation of the Armenian alphabet and the translation of Christian texts into Armenian. Eznik studied at the school of Ashtishat and participated in the translation of the Bible and other texts into Armenian. At their request he went first to Edessa, then to Constantinople to perfect himself in the various sciences and to collect or copy Syriac and Greek manuscripts of the Bible, and the writings of the Church Fathers. He returned to Armenia after 434.

He is probably identical with Eznik, bishop of the region of Bagrevand, who took part in the Synod of Artashat in 449.

== Works ==
In addition to his labors in connection with the new version of the Bible and various translations, he composed several works, the principal of which is his remarkable apologetic treatise Against the Sects or On God. It was written between 441 and 449, and contains four parts:

- In the first, against the pagans, Eznik combats the eternity of matter and the substantial existence of evil.
- In the second he refutes the chief doctrines of Zoroastrianism (particularly Zurvanism).
- The third is directed against aspects of the beliefs of the Greek philosophers (Pythagoreans, Platonists, Peripatetics, Stoics and Epicureans). This is the only section in which Eznik takes his arguments from the Bible rather than from reason.
- The fourth book is an exposition and refutation of Marcionism as a dualist heresy.

An essential theme of the work is on the importance of free will in Christian theology. Eznik displays much acumen and an extensive erudition. Eznik was evidently as familiar with the Persian language (Middle Persian) as with Greek literature. His Armenian diction is of the choicest classical type, although the nature of his subject matter forced him to use quite a number of Greek words. The book also contains many interesting asides, such as Eznik's refutation of astrology and his diversion to the topic of animal behavior and psychology.

The original manuscript of Against the Sects is lost. The work survived due to a single medieval transcription copied at the University of Gladzor. This manuscript is currently held at the Matenadaran in Yerevan, Armenia. A copy of the first printing of Against the Sects as a book in Smyrna (now Izmir) in 1762 is in the collection at the British Library. The Mechitarists at Venice published an updated edition in 1826 and again in 1865. The source of all modern printed editions is the earliest manuscript dated 1280 (Matenadaran № 1097). Two of the earliest manuscripts copied by different scribes are dated to 1280 and one of them is lost.

== Translations ==
- An older French translation (titled Réfutation des différentes sectes) by LeVaillant de Florival was published in 1853. A newer French translation was published in 1959 together with a critical edition of the Armenian text.
- A German translation (titled Eznik von Kolb, Wider die Sekten) by J. M. Schmid was published in 1900.
- A complete English translation (titled On God) by Monica Blanchard and Robin Darling Young was published in 1998.
- An (abridged) retelling of the work in English (titled Refutation of the Sects) by Thomas Samuelian was published in 1986 and is available to read online. The full text of 'Refutations' was also later published by D.P. Curtin in 2007.

== Bibliography ==
- Ayvazyan, Hovhannes, ed. (2002). Kʻristonya Hayastan hanragitaran Քրիստոնյա Հայաստան հանրագիտարան [Christian Armenia encyclopedia] (PDF) (in Armenian). Yerevan: Haykakan hanragitaran hratarakchʻutʻyun. ISBN 9785897000166.
- Durkin-Meisterernst, Desmond (2012). "Eznik on Manichaeism". Iran and the Caucasus. 16 (1): 1–11. doi:10.1163/160984912X13309560273975.
- Hage, Wolfgang (2002). "Marcion bei Eznik von Kolb". In Greschat, Katharina; May, Gerhard (eds.). Marcion und seine kirchengeschichtliche Wirkung / Marcion and His Impact on Church History. De Gruyter. pp. 29–37. ISBN 9783110905595.
- Orengo, Alessandro (2016). "Eznik of Kołb as a Translator of Methodius of Olympus". In Traina, Giusto; Pagani, Lara; Gazzano, Francesca (eds.). Greek Texts and Armenian Traditions: An Interdisciplinary Approach. De Gruyter. pp. 31–45. ISBN 9783110488661.
- Herbermann, Charles, ed. (1913). "Eznik". Catholic Encyclopedia. New York: Robert Appleton Company.
