= Armenia–Turkey border =

International border

Armenia-Turkey border Հայաստան-Թուրքիա սահման Ermenistan-Türkiye sınırı
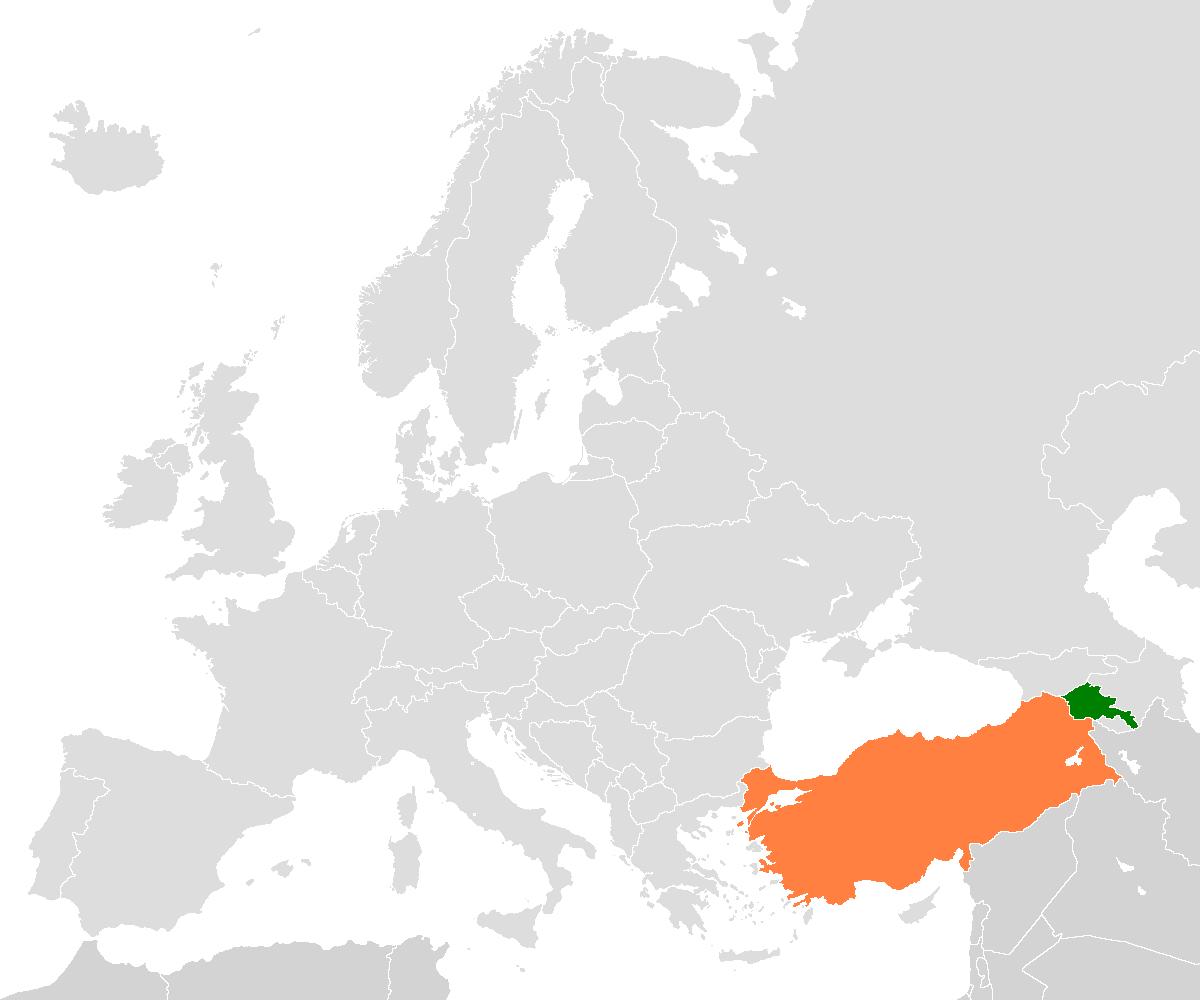

Characteristics
- Entities: Armenia Turkey
- Length: 328 km (204 mi)

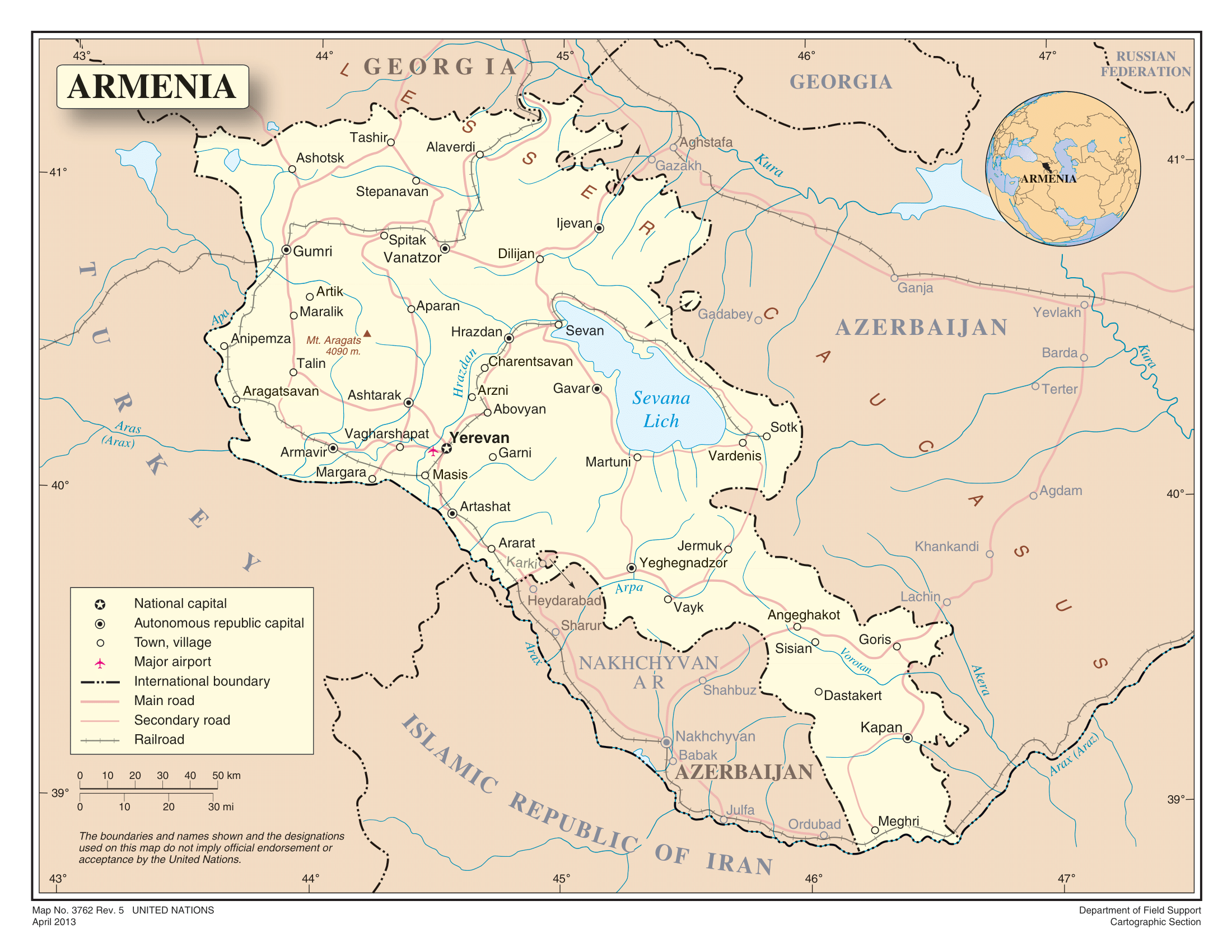
Map of Armenia, with Turkey to the west

The Armenia–Turkey border (Armenian: Հայաստան–Թուրքիա սահման, romanized: Hayastan–T’urk’ia sahman; Turkish: Ermenistan–Türkiye sınırı) is 311 km (193 mi) in length and runs from the tripoint with Georgia in the north to the tripoint with Azerbaijan in the south. The land border has officially been closed since 3 April 1993 when Turkey joined Azerbaijan in imposing a transportation and economic blockade against Armenia and Nagorno-Karabakh, in response to the Karabakh movement which called for independence from Azerbaijan and reunification with Armenia. Should Turkey, which is a candidate for EU membership, accede to the EU, Armenia will be a border neighbor with the European Union.

The blockade remains in force today and aims at pressuring the Armenian side to make concessions: including the cessation of Armenia's pursuit of international recognition of Turkey's genocide in Western Armenia, the ratification by Armenia of the 1921 borders inherited from the Kemalist-Soviet Treaty of Kars, (Note: Following Turkey's invasion of Armenia in 1920, the Democratic Republic of Armenia signed the Treaty of Alexandropol under duress, effectively accepting Turkish territorial demands. However, the treaty was never ratified by an independent post-Soviet Armenia.) and the establishment of an extraterritorial corridor through Armenian territory.

Despite the official closure of land borders in 1993, the Turkish–Armenian border had already de facto been closed since the 1920s (with the exception of the Kars-Gyumri railway crossing) and is sometimes described as the last vestige of the Iron Curtain.

Between 1992 and 2025, the border was protected by guards of the Russian Federal Security Service after which protection was transferred to the Armenian Border Guard Service.

== Description ==
The border starts in the north at the tripoint with Georgia just west of Lake Arpi and proceeds southwards through the Armenian Highlands, dividing Western Armenia (situated in Turkey) from Eastern Armenia (corresponding roughly to the Republic of Armenia). Upon reaching the Akhurian River it follows the river south down to the confluence with the Aras river, and then follows the Aras as it flows east and then south-east, down to the tripoint with Azerbaijan's Nakhchivan Autonomous Republic. The ancient ruins of the Armenian medieval city of Ani lie directly adjacent to the border on the Turkish side.

The modern borders between Republic of Armenia and the Republic of Turkey were defined by the Treaty of Alexandropol (1920) and later finalized in the Treaty of Kars (1921).

== History ==
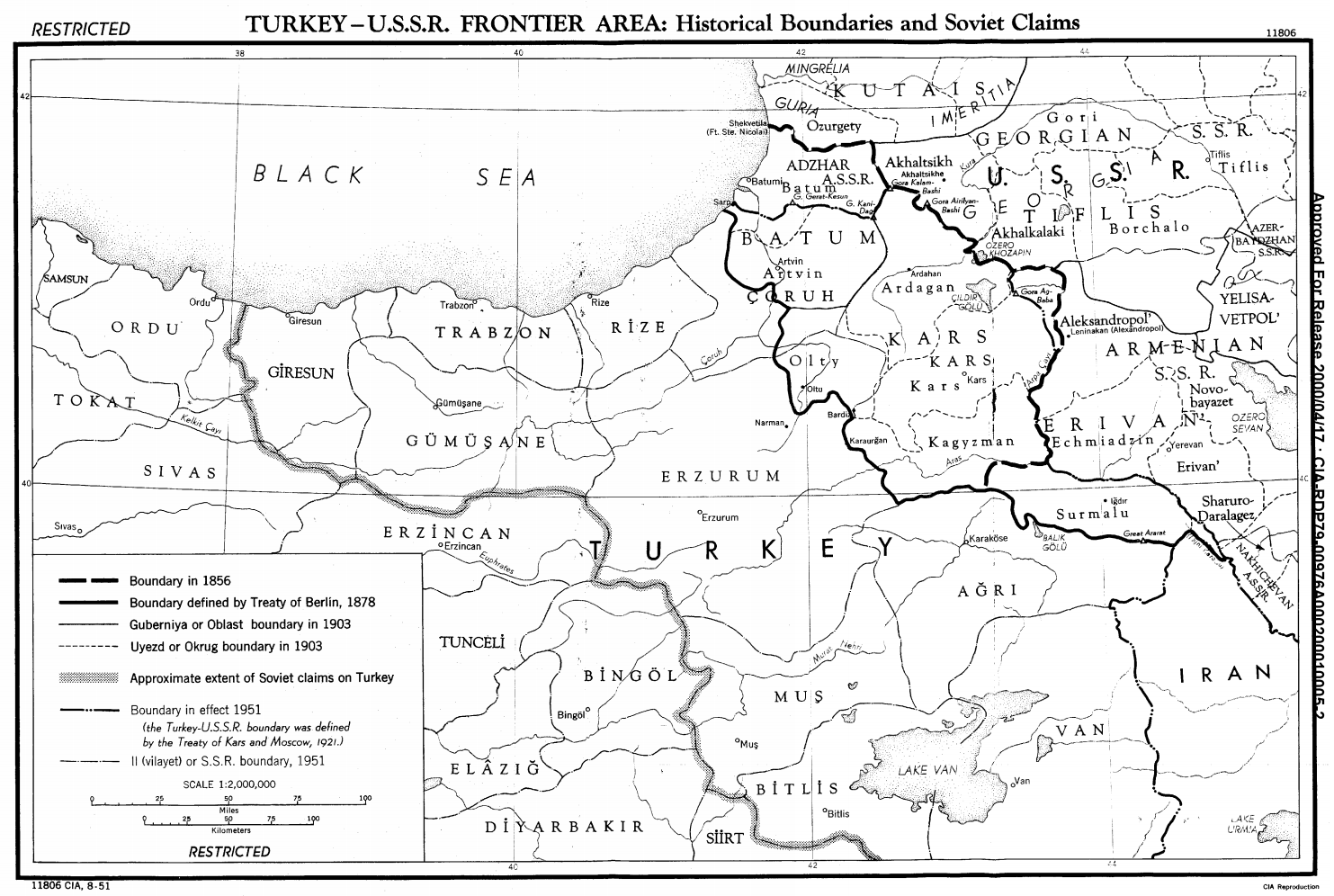
Map of the shifting border between Russia and the Ottoman Empire in the 19th century

During the 19th century, the Caucasus region was contested between the declining Ottoman Empire, Persia and Russia, which was expanding southwards. Russia had conquered most of Persia's Caucasian lands by 1828, including all of what is now Armenia (termed Eastern Armenia), and then turned its attention to the Ottoman Empire. With the 1829 Treaty of Adrianople (ending the Russo-Turkish War of 1828–29), by which Russia gained most of modern Georgia, the Ottomans recognised Russian suzerainty over eastern Armenia.

By the Treaty of San Stefano, ending the Russo-Turkish War (1877–1878), Russia gained considerable land in what is now eastern Turkey (termed Western Armenia), extending the Ottoman-Russian frontier south-westwards. Russia's gains of Batumi, Kars and Ardahan were confirmed by the Treaty of Berlin (1878), though it was compelled to hand back part of the area around Bayazid (modern Doğubayazıt) and the Eleşkirt valley.

During the First World War Russia invaded the eastern areas of the Ottoman Empire. In the chaos following the 1917 Russian Revolution, the new Communist government hastily sought to end its involvement in the war and signed the Treaty of Brest-Litovsk in 1918 with Germany and the Ottoman Empire. By this treaty, Russia handed back to Turkey the areas gained by the earlier Treaties of San Stefano and Berlin.

Seeking to gain independence from both empires, the peoples of the southern Caucasus had declared the Transcaucasian Democratic Federative Republic in 1918 and started peace talks with the Ottomans. Internal disagreements led to Georgia leaving the federation in May 1918, followed shortly thereafter by Armenia and Azerbaijan. With the Ottomans having invaded the Caucasus and quickly gained ground, the three new republics were compelled to sign the Treaty of Batum on 4 June 1918, by which they recognised the pre-1878 border. Armenia in particular was reeling from the aftermath of the Ottoman-led Armenian genocide, which resulted in vast numbers of refugees fleeing Western Armenia.

With the Ottoman Empire defeated in Europe and Arabia, the Allied powers planned to partition it via the 1920 Treaty of Sèvres. The treaty recognised Georgian and Armenian independence, granting both vast lands in eastern Turkey (in Armenia's case this was dubbed 'Wilsonian Armenia', after US President Woodrow Wilson), with an extended Armenia-Georgia border to be decided at a later date. Turkish nationalists were outraged at the treaty, contributing to the outbreak of the Turkish War of Independence; the Turkish success in this conflict rendered Sèvres obsolete. Ottoman gains in Armenia were consolidated by the Treaty of Aleksandropol (1920).

In 1920 Russia's Red Army had invaded Azerbaijan and Armenia, ending the independence of both, followed shortly thereafter by Georgia. In order to avoid an all-out Russo-Turkish war the two nations signed the Treaty of Moscow in March 1921, which created a modified Soviet-Ottoman border. However, further fighting took place on the ground and the talks stalled; the treaty's provisions were later confirmed by the Treaty of Kars of October 1921, finalising what is the current Armenia–Turkey border. The border was then demarcated on the ground in March 1925 – July 1926 by a joint Soviet-Turkish commission. Turkey's independence had been recognised by the 1923 Treaty of Lausanne.

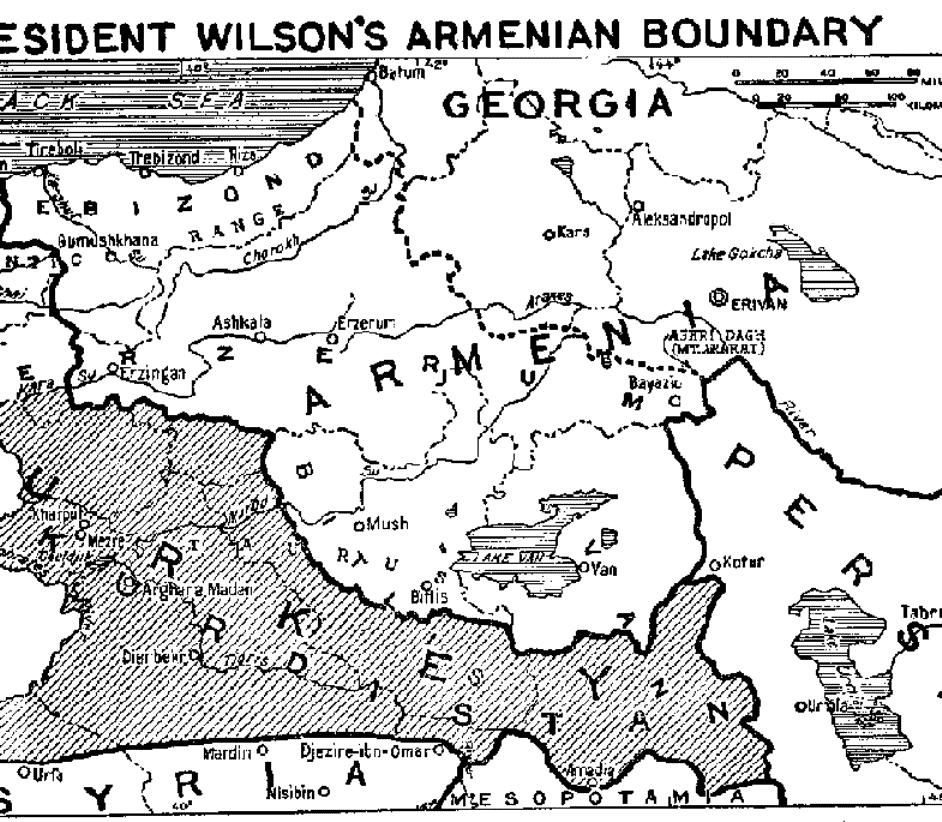
Map of 'Wilsonian Armenia'

Armenia was initially incorporated along with Georgia and Azerbaijan in the Transcaucasian SFSR within the USSR, before being split off as the Armenian Soviet Socialist Republic in 1936. The Kars Treaty border remained, despite occasional Soviet protests that it should be amended, notably in 1945. Turkey, backed by the US, refused to discuss the matter, and the Soviets, seeking better relations with their southern neighbour, dropped the issue.

Following the collapse of the Soviet Union in 1991 Armenia gained independence and inherited its section of the Soviet Union-Turkey border. Though Turkey recognised Armenian independence, relations between the two countries almost immediately soured and the border was shut. In 1993 Turkey joined Azerbaijan in imposing a transportation and economic embargo against Armenia and Nagorno-Karabakh, in response to the Karabakh movement which called for independence from Azerbaijan and reunification with Armenia. Turkey later joined the blockade against Armenia in 1993. The blockade remains in force today and aims at pressuring the Armenian side to make concessions: namely, the resolution of the Nagorno-Karabakh conflict in Azerbaijan's favor, the cessation of Armenia's pursuit of international recognition of Turkey's genocide in Western Armenia, the ratification by Armenia of the 1921 borders inherited from the Kemalist-Soviet Treaty of Kars and the establishment of an extraterritorial corridor through Armenian territory.

Relations thawed slightly in the 2000s decade, resulting in the signing of the Zurich Protocols in 2009, in which it was envisaged the border could re-open. The talks foundered, however, and the border remains closed.

In July 2022, the Turkish Ministry for Foreign Affairs announced that the two countries, in the context of a general thaw of their relationship, plan to reopen the border "at the earliest possible date", albeit only for third party nationals.

On February 11, 2023, the Alican border crossing was temporarily opened for the first time in 35 years, to let humanitarian aid from Armenia reach victims of the 2023 Turkey–Syria earthquake. It was last opened after the Spitak earthquake in Soviet Armenia.

== Settlements near the border ==
=== Armenia ===
- Amasia
- Byurakn
- Gyumri
- Akhurik
- Haykadzor
- Anipemza
- Tlik
- Getap
- Aragatsavan
- Bagaran
- Vanand
- Yervandashat
- Armavir
- Nalbandyan
- Janfida
- Pshatavan
- Margara
- Ranchpar
- Masis
- Mkhchyan
- Artashat
- Lusarat
- Yeghegnavan
- Ararat
- Aygavan
- Ararat

=== Turkey ===
- Duruyol
- Akyaka
- Kars
- Kocaköy
- Tuzluca
- Iğdır
- Karakoyunlu
- Alican
- Taşburun
- Aralık

== Crossings ==
There were three crossings along the entire border, two for vehicular traffic and one for rail traffic. They have been closed since 3 April 1993.

(Turkey) Turkish checkpoint	Province	(Armenia) Armenian checkpoint	Province	Opened	Route in Turkey	Route in Armenia	Status
Akyaka	Kars	Akhurik	Shirak	4 September 1953 – 11 July 1993			Closed
Alican	Iğdır	Margara	Armavir	1993			Closed
Dogukapi	Kars	Akhuryan	Gyumri	1899–1993	to Kars	to Gyumri	Closed

== Gallery ==
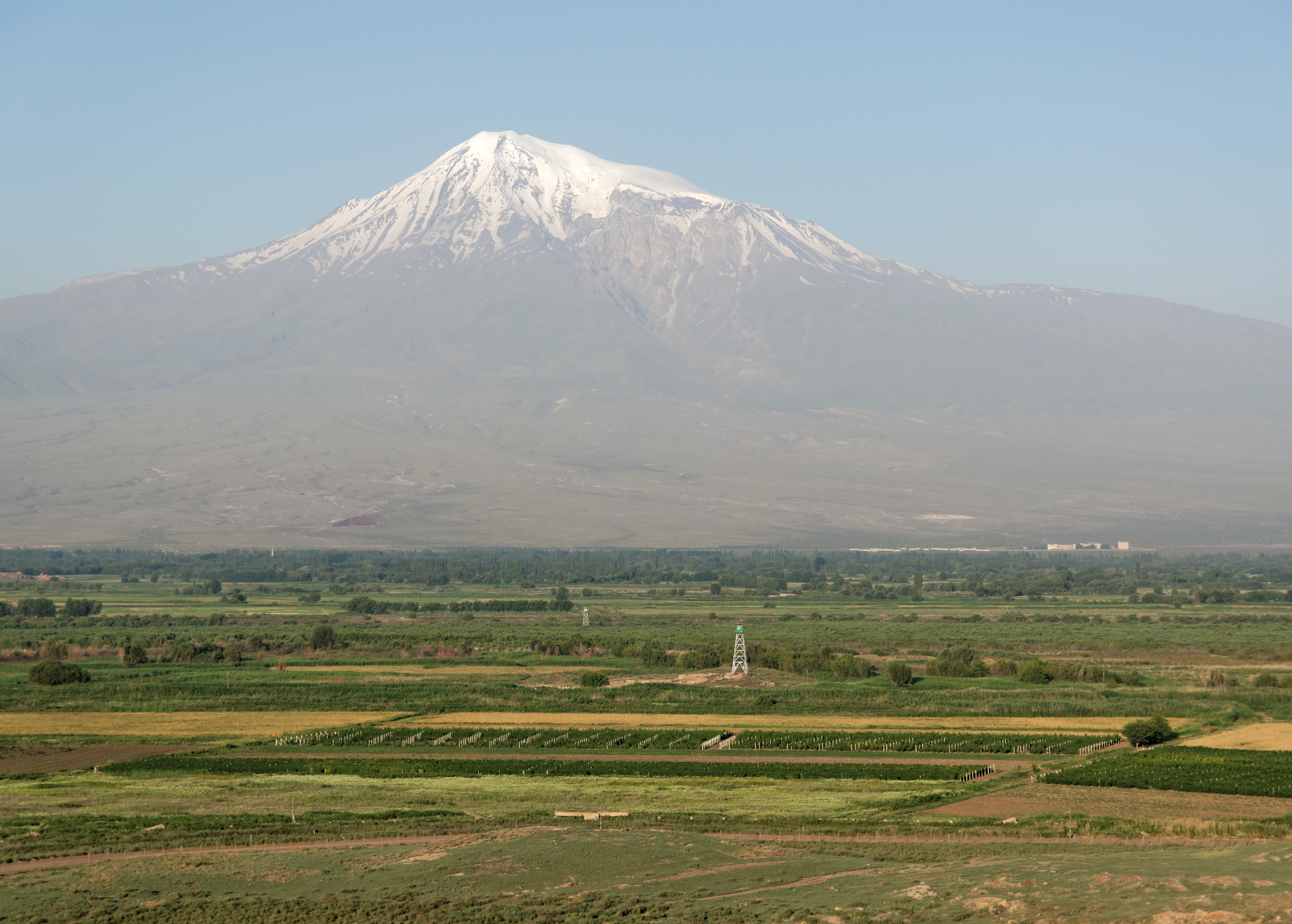
International Armenia–Turkey border near Khor Virap

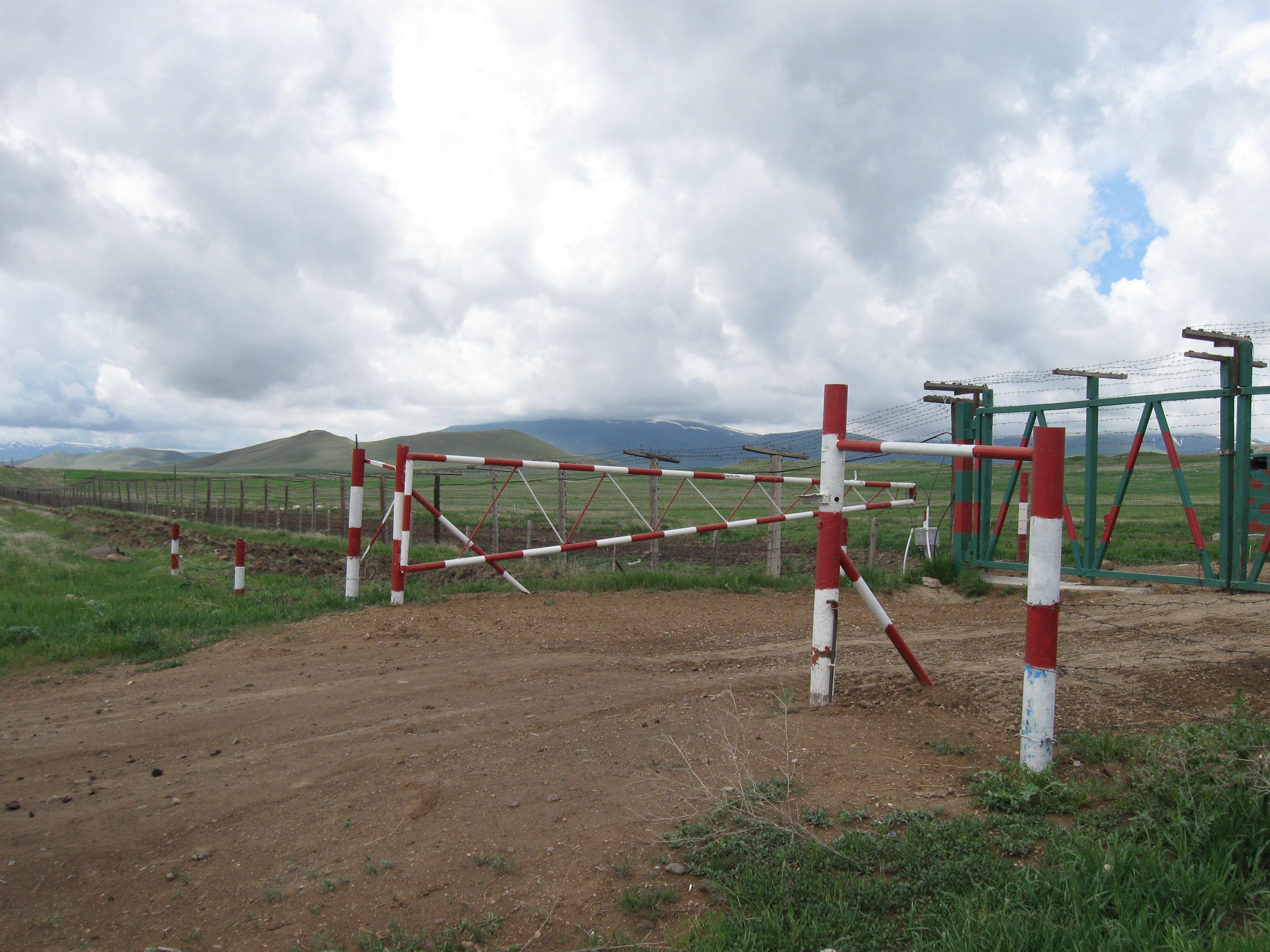
Border fence near Ani

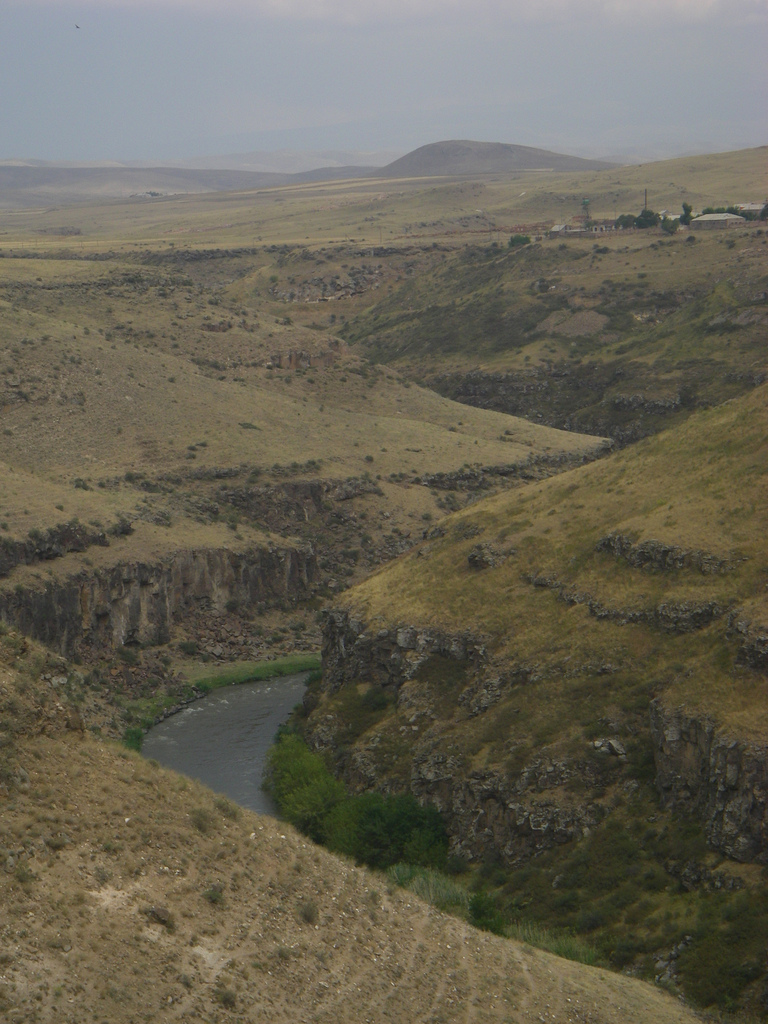
The border along the Arkhurian river

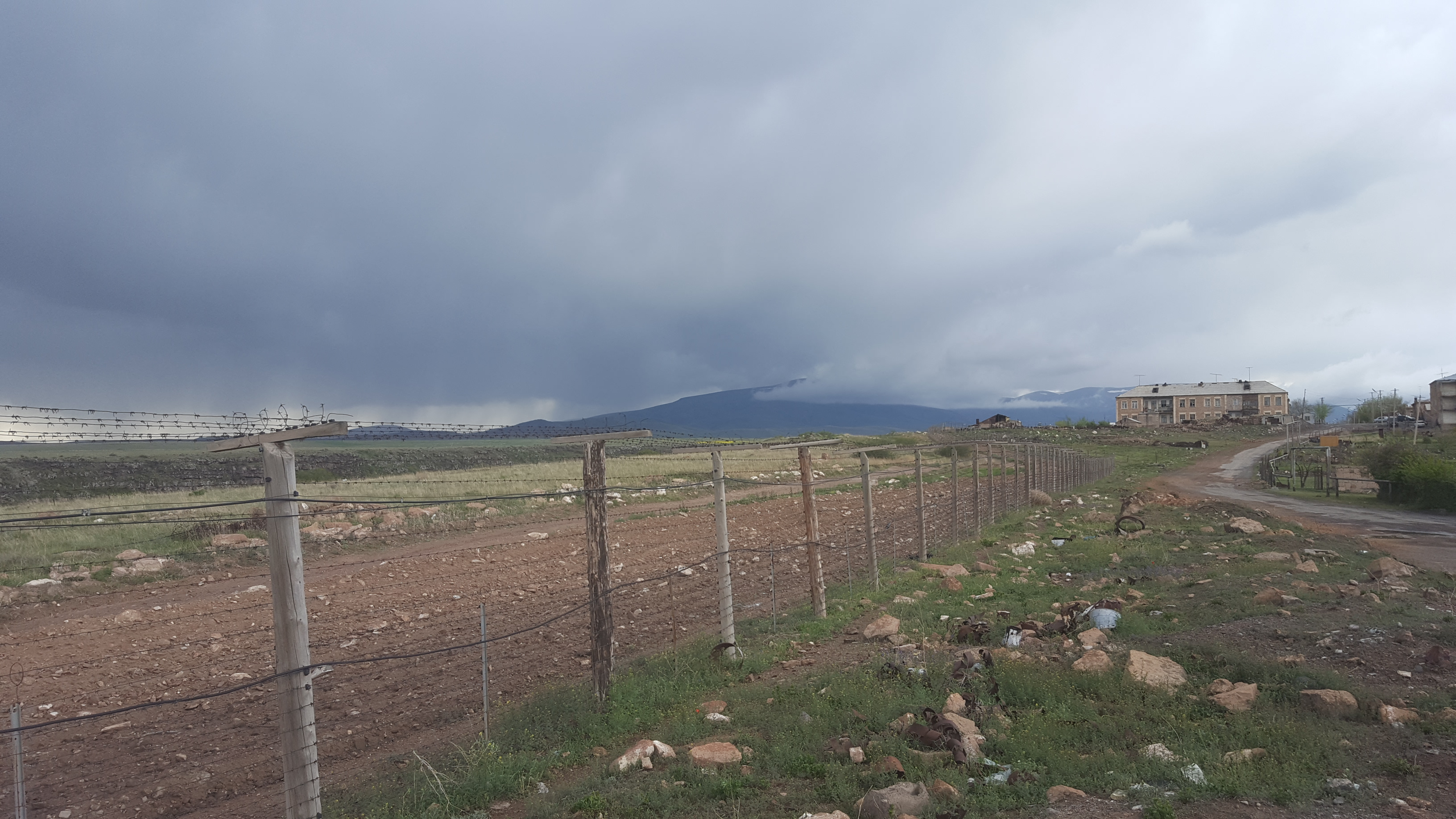
Border fence near Yereruyk

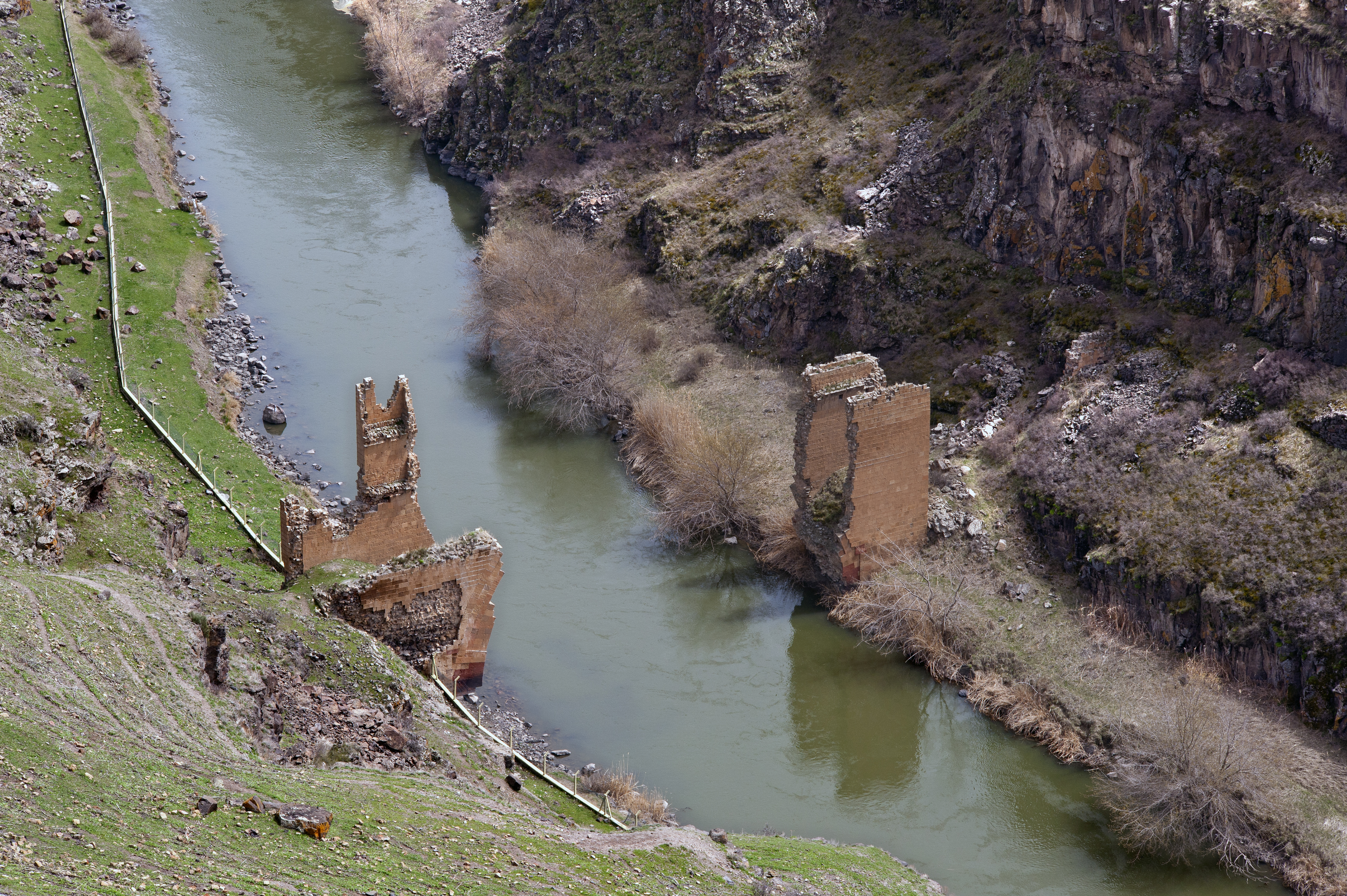
Destroyed bridge over the Arkhurian river

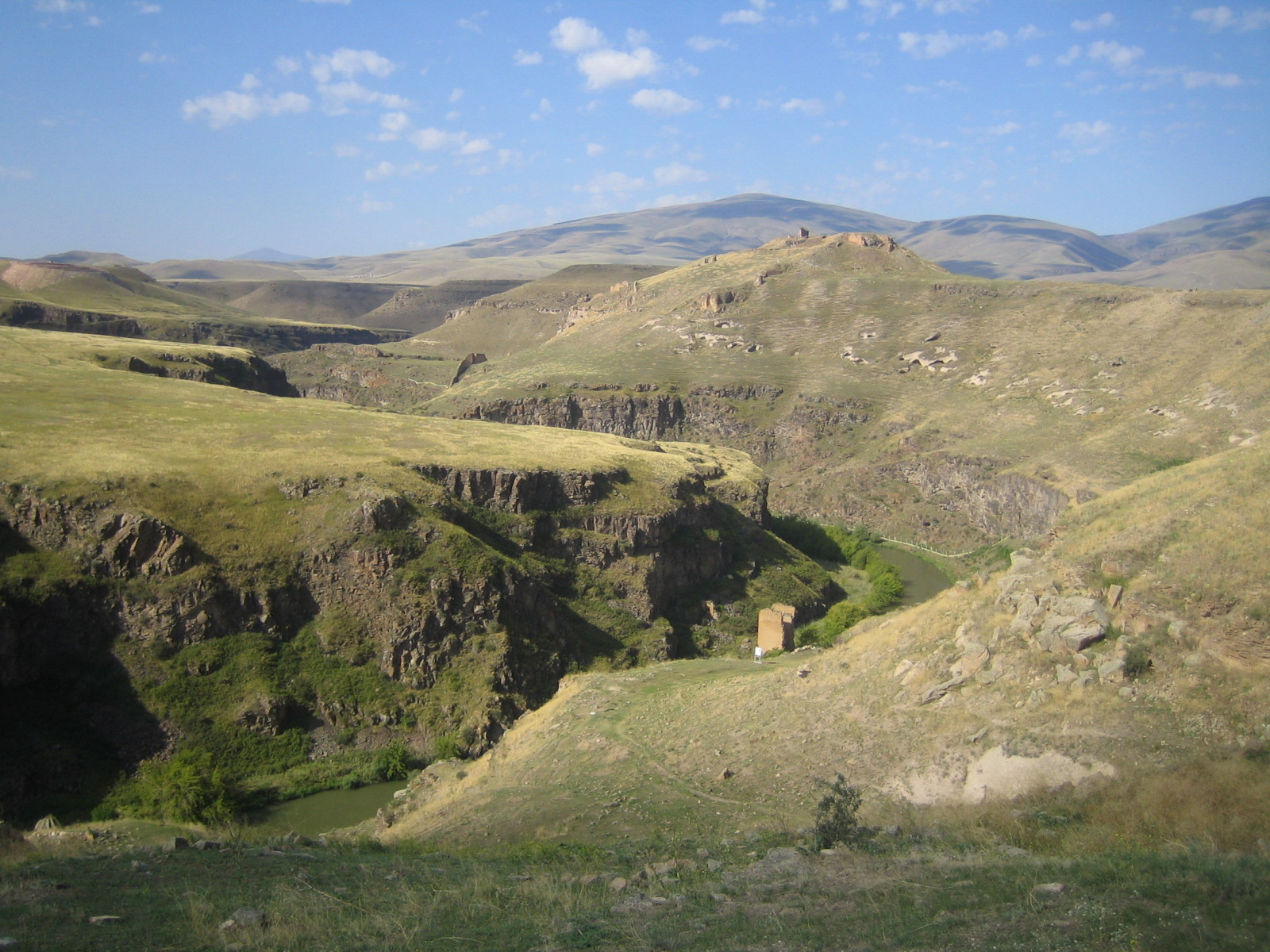
Border near Ani

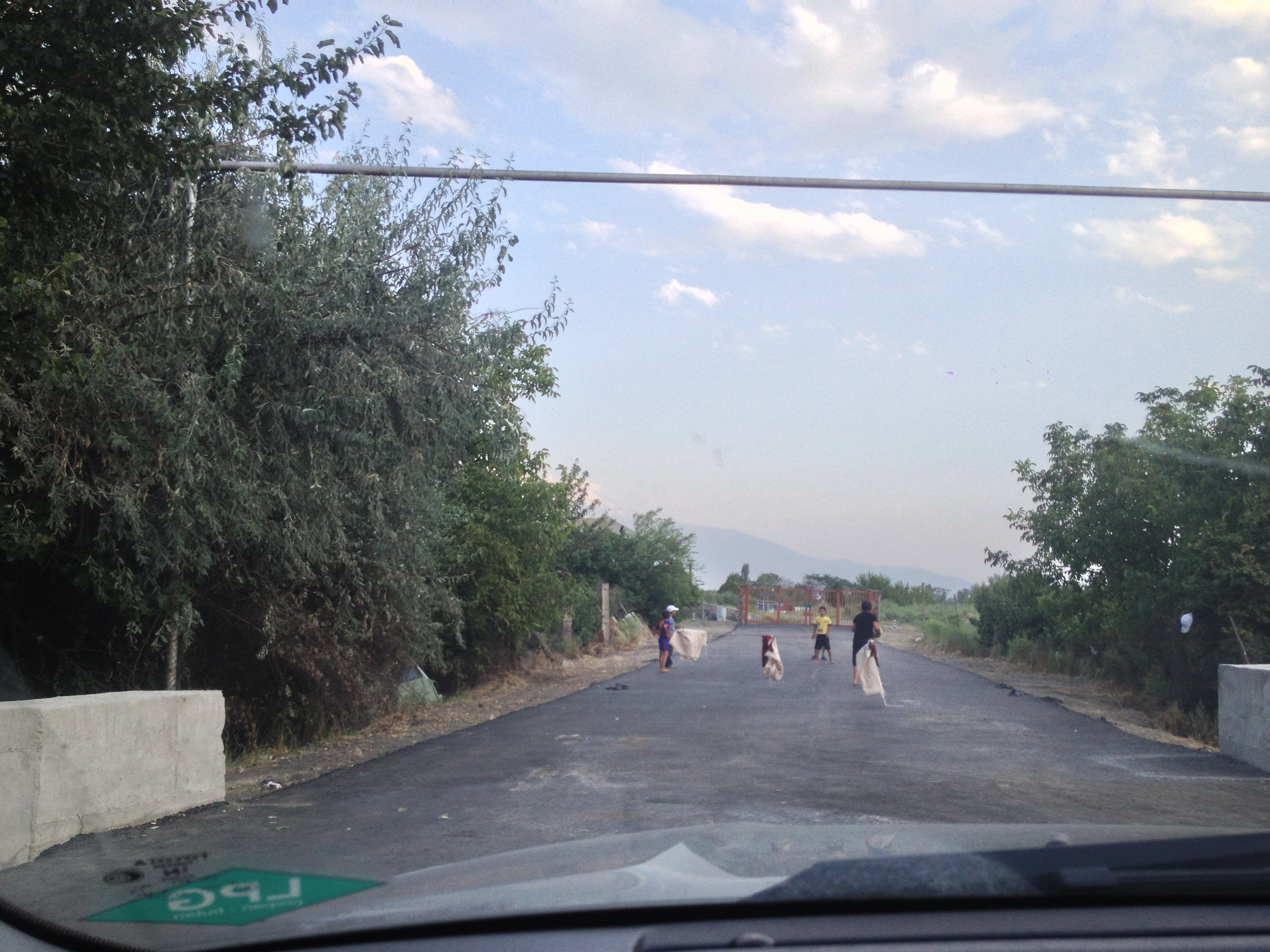
Border near Margara

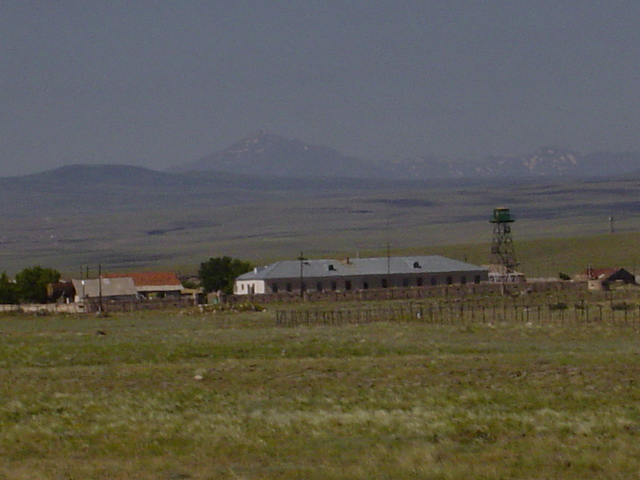
Armenian border post

== See also ==
- Armenia–Turkey relations
