= Taşburun, Karakoyunlu =

Taşburun
- Municipality
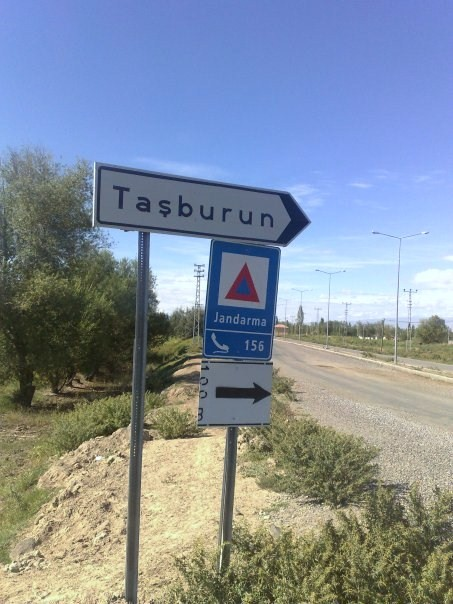

- Location within Turkey
- Coordinates: 39°59′N 44°15′E
- Country: Turkey
- Province: Iğdır
- District: Karakoyunlu
- Elevation: 840 m (2,760 ft)
- Population (2022): 2,098
- Time zone: UTC+3 (TRT)
- Postal code: 76800
- Area code: 0476

Taşburun is a village in Karakoyunlu District, Iğdır Province, Turkey. Its population is 927 (2022). Before the 2013 reorganisation, it was a town (belde). The village is populated by Azerbaijanis.

== Geography ==
Taşburun is situated on Turkish state highway D.080 which connects Turkey to the Nakhchivan Autonomous Republic of Azerbaijan. Mount Ararat is to the south and Armenian border is to the east. The distance to Karakoyunlu is 8 kilometres (5.0 mi) and to Iğdır is 22 kilometres (14 mi).

== Population ==
Historical population
Year	Pop.	±% p.a.
1990	2,572	—
1997	1,771	−5.19%
2007	2,186	+2.13%
2012	2,076	−1.03%
2017	1,434	−7.13%
2022	927	−8.36%
Source: Population censuses (1990-1997) and TÜIK (2007-2022)

== Economy ==
Main economic sectors are agriculture and animal breeding. There is also a small flour factory.
