= Alican, Iğdır =

Alican
- Location within Turkey
- Coordinates: 40°01′42″N 44°10′44″E
- Country: Turkey
- Region: Eastern Anatolia
- Province: Iğdır
- District: Karakoyunlu
- Time zone: UTC+3 (TRT)

Alican is the name of the Turkish border crossing point in Iğdır Province on the closed border of Turkey and Armenia. Alican is located on the other side of Margara. The Alican border crossing has been guarded by Turkish border guards since 1992. Turkey closed its border with Armenia in 1993 due to support for Azerbaijan during the First Nagorno-Karabakh War.

== History ==
In 2023, the border crossing briefly reopened to allow the passage of humanitarian aid following the Turkey–Syria earthquake for the first time since 1988.
