= Haykadzor =

Village in Shirak, Armenia

Haykadzor Հայկաձոր
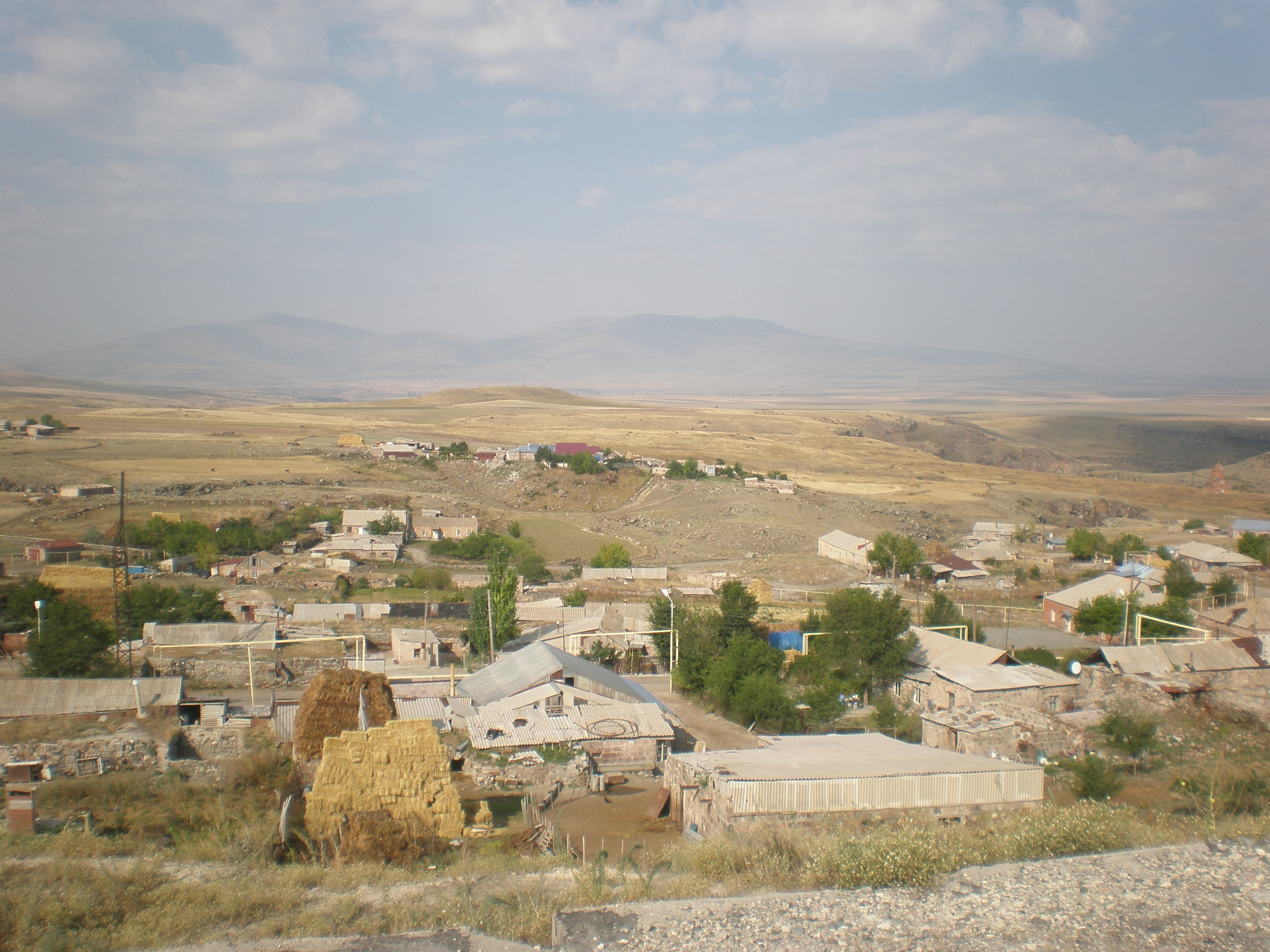

- Location within Armenia Location within Shirak
- Coordinates: 40°32′16″N 43°39′39″E
- Country: Armenia
- Province: Shirak
- Municipality: Ani

Population (2011)
  - Total: 380
- Time zone: UTC+4
  - Summer (DST): UTC+5

Haykadzor (Armenian: Հայկաձոր) is a village in the Ani Municipality of the Shirak Province of Armenia near the Armenia–Turkey border

== Demographics ==
Historical population
Year	Pop.	±% p.a.
1831	152	—
1897	1,052	+2.97%
1926	840	−0.77%
1939	856	+0.15%
1959	596	−1.79%
1970	483	−1.89%
1979	413	−1.72%
2001	474	+0.63%
2011	380	−2.19%
