= Treaty of Alexandropol =

1920 peace treaty between Armenia and Turkey

- Type: Peace treaty
- Signed: 3 December 1920
- Location: Alexandropol, First Republic of Armenia: First Republic of Armenia; Grand National Assembly of Turkey

Full text
- tr:Gümrü Antlaşması at Wikisource

The Treaty of Alexandropol (Armenian: Ալեքսանդրապոլի պայմանագիր; Turkish: Gümrü Anlaşması or "Gyumri Treaty") was a peace treaty between the First Republic of Armenia and the Grand National Assembly of Turkey. The treaty formally ended Turkey's invasion of Armenia that had begun on 12 September 1920.

It was signed by the Armenian Foreign Minister Alexander Khatisyan in the early hours of 3 December 1920; however, the previous day, the Armenian government in Yerevan had resigned and transferred power to a Soviet government and so Khatisyan was no longer acting on behalf of the government of Armenia, and the treaty was invalid.

The treaty required Armenia to relinquish claims to Western Armenia, cede over half of its territory to Turkey while also transferring Nakhchivan to Azerbaijan, and accept conditions that reduced Armenia to the status of a Turkish client state. Although later deemed invalid, its terms shaped the framework for the borders later confirmed by the Treaty of Kars and underscored the collapse of the sovereignty of the First Republic of Armenia.

== Impact ==
The terms of the Alexandropol Treaty were prepared by Turkey, with no concessions made to the Armenians. Turkey rejected Khatisyan's appeals for the inclusion of Surmalu, Mount Ararat, and the medieval capital of Ani, for their significant importance to Armenian culture and history.

The Alexandropol Treaty forced Armenia to forfeit all claims to Western Armenia which had been promised under the Treaty of Sevres, reduce its military to a token force, and accept Turkish oversight. Turkey was to assume control over transportation and communications, thereby reducing Armenia to a Turkish protectorate or vassal state. Turkey was granted the right of transit through Armenian territory. A large part of the south of Yerevan province was ceded to Azerbaijan, later to become the Turkish protectorate of Nakhchivan.

The Alexandropol Treaty also changed the boundary of the First Republic of Armenia to the Ardahan-Kars borderline and ceded over half of the First Republic of Armenia to the Grand National Assembly of Turkey. The tenth item in the agreement required that Armenia renounce the Treaty of Sèvres. The new borders were later ratified by the Treaty of Kars, signed by the Grand National Assembly of Turkey and, at Soviet Russia's insistence, the three Soviet republics of Armenia, Georgia, and Azerbaijan.

With the mass flight of Armenians from the regions designated for Turkish annexation, Turkish General Karabekir proposed a plebiscite based on self-determination, echoing the procedure the Ottomans had used to legitimize the seizure of Kars after the Treaty of Brest-Litovsk. Karabekir also attempted to include text in the treaty that claimed that Armenians had never formed a majority in any part of the Ottoman Empire.

== Articles of the treaty ==
An abbreviated version of the treaty terms is as follows: Historian Richard G. Hovannisian also provides a paraphrased English translation but he notes that there are multiple versions in different languages which are not in agreement in wording of even in the number of articles.

1. The state of war between Turkey and the Armenian Republic has ended.
2. The frontier between Turkey and Armenia. Armenia will not interfere in the administrative form to be chosen by general election and that administration's jurisdiction in Mount Kouki, Mount Gamasour, the village of Koutoulak, Mount Saat, the houses in Arpatchai, Mount Kemourlu, Sarayboulak, the station Ararat, and the southern part of the estuary of the Lower Karasou on the Arax River (Nakhitchevan, Shahtakhti, Shamour). The administration of this zone shall be under Turkish protection.
3. The Government of the Grand National Assembly of Turkey may consider the wishes of the Armenian Republic about the relocation of the entire native population back into the territories designated in the second article, existing in the old Ottoman boundaries, which shall remain to Turkey by irrefutable historical, ethnic, and legalistic rights.
4. The Armenian Government undertakes not to maintain any military organization 1,500 riflemen with 8 mountain or field guns and 20 machine guns for the protection of its internal peace. There will be no military conscription in Armenia anymore. The Armenian Republic is free to build fortifications and place in them as many heavy artillery pieces as it wishes for the protection of the country against external enemies. This heavy artillery includes 15 cm shells and 15 cm long rifles that can be used, and lesser ones used in field armies. No larger guns will be found.
5. The Armenian Government permits the Turkish representative in Yerevan to be free to investigate all these matters at any time. In return, the Grand National Assembly promises military assistance to Armenia in any internal or external trouble.
6. The two parties permit the return of refugees to their homelands across the old boundaries, with the exception of those who, during the general war, went to the enemy's army and took arms, and those who crossed occupied territories and participated in massacres.
7. Those refugees mentioned in Article 6 who do not return to their homelands within one year after the ratification of this treaty, besides not being able to benefit from the generosity of the said article, will also lose their legal claims.
8. The two parties forego their rights to ask for damages because of the changes that took place as a result of the general war.
9. The Turkish Grand National Assembly promises to render assistance in the most sincere manner for the complete formulation and defense of the Armenian Republic mentioned in the second article, with utmost integrity.
10. The Armenian Government declares and considers void and null the Treaty of Sevres.
11. The Armenian Republic admits and vouchsafes the authority of the vicar of the chief of Sheri of the National Grand Assembly of Turkey to ratify the appointment of the chief Mufti, elected by the direct vote of muftis, as well as the organization and enactment of the rights of the people living in the country for the realization of their aspirations and religious sentiments.
12. The two contracting parties mutually promise not to hinder the free passage of any person or any merchandise belonging to any person on all routes (also of Armenia and Iran), from side to side, by sea and between any country in transit operations. The Turkish State will take all railroads and transportation routes in the Armenian Republic under its own control to prevent treacherous acts against its integrity and totality by imperialists until complete peace is established. The two parties will forbid the official and unofficial agents of imperialist (Entente) powers from causing any damage or disturbance inside the Republic.
13. The Turkish Government of the National Grand Assembly can take temporary military preventive measures in Armenia against attacks that may threaten its territorial integrity, on condition that such measures do not disturb the rights of the Republic of Armenia conceded in this territory.
14. All treaties signed by the Republic of Armenia with any country that relate to Turkey or are harmful to the interests of Turkey are agreed to be absolutely null and void.
15. Commercial relations between the two parties will begin, and ambassadors and consuls will be exchanged upon the signature of the treaty.
16. Regulations for telegraphic, postal, telephone, consular, and commercial relations will be established by mixed commissions according to the provisions of this treaty. Meanwhile, Turkey will be authorized by the State to resume telegraphic, postal, and railroad communications between Armenia and occupied territories as soon as the treaty is signed.
17. The determination of the frontiers of the Armenian Republic will immediately be put into effect. The civilians, prisoners, and notable figures held in detention will be returned.
18. This treaty is subject to ratification within a month.

== See also ==
- Armenia–Turkey border
- Treaty of Kars
