= Getap, Aragatsotn =

Getap Գետափ
- Location within Armenia Location within Aragatsotn
- Coordinates: 40°23′14″N 43°37′18″E
- Country: Armenia
- Province: Aragatsotn
- Municipality: Aragatsavan

Population (2011)
  - Total: 159
- Time zone: UTC+4
  - Summer (DST): UTC+5

Getap (Armenian: Գետափ), known until 1946 as Karakula or Gharaghla is a village in the Aragatsavan Municipality of the Aragatsotn Province of Armenia, located near the Armenia–Turkey border.
