= Yeghegnavan =

Yeghegnavan Եղեգնավան
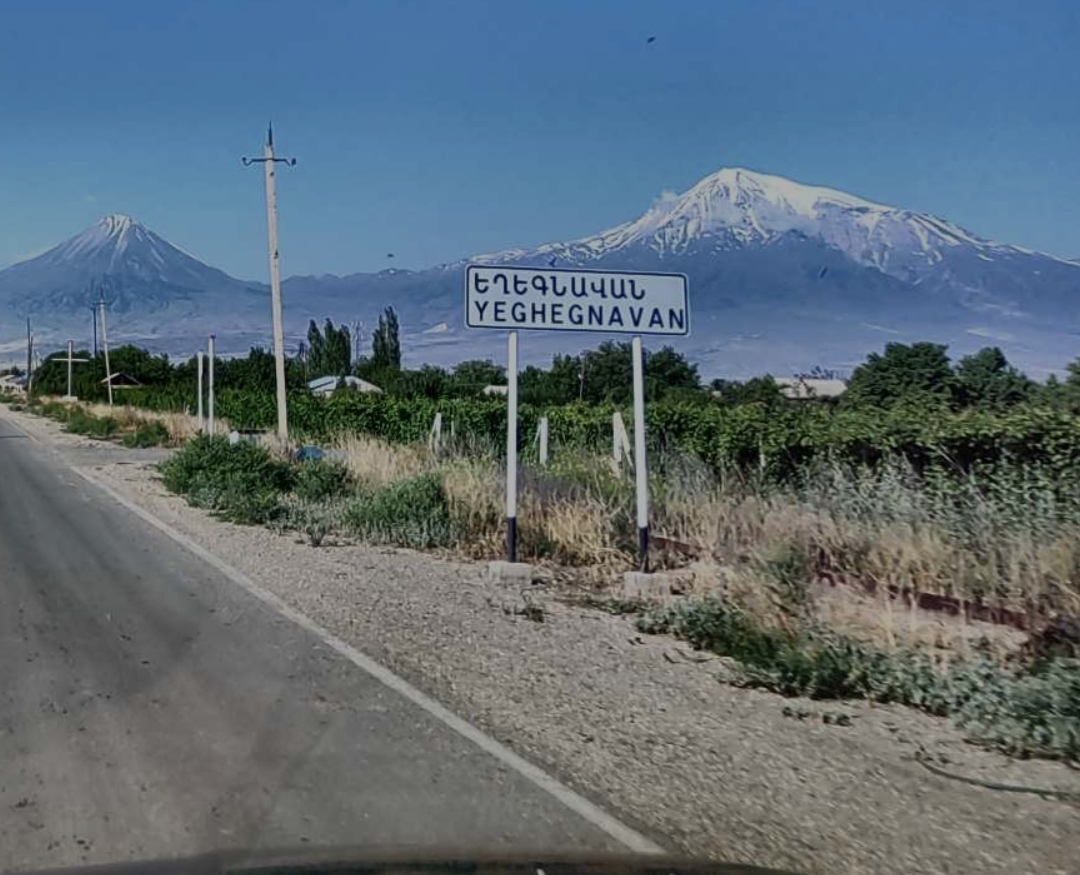
- Yeghegnavan

- Location within Armenia Location within Ararat
- Coordinates: 39°49′40″N 44°38′14″E
- Country: Armenia
- Province: Ararat
- Municipality: Vedi

Population (2011)
  - Total: 1,420
- Time zone: UTC+4
  - Summer (DST): UTC+5

Yeghegnavan (Armenian: Եղեգնավան; Azerbaijani: Şidli) is a village in the Vedi Municipality of the Ararat Province of Armenia, near the Armenia–Turkey border. The village was populated by Azerbaijanis before the exodus of Azerbaijanis from Armenia after the outbreak of the Nagorno-Karabakh conflict.
