= Margara =

Village in Armavir, Armenia

Margara Մարգարա
- Location within Armenia
- Coordinates: 40°02′01″N 44°10′26″E
- Country: Armenia
- Marz (Province): Armavir

Population (2011)
  - Total: 1,256
- Time zone: UTC+4 ( )
  - Summer (DST): UTC+5 ( )

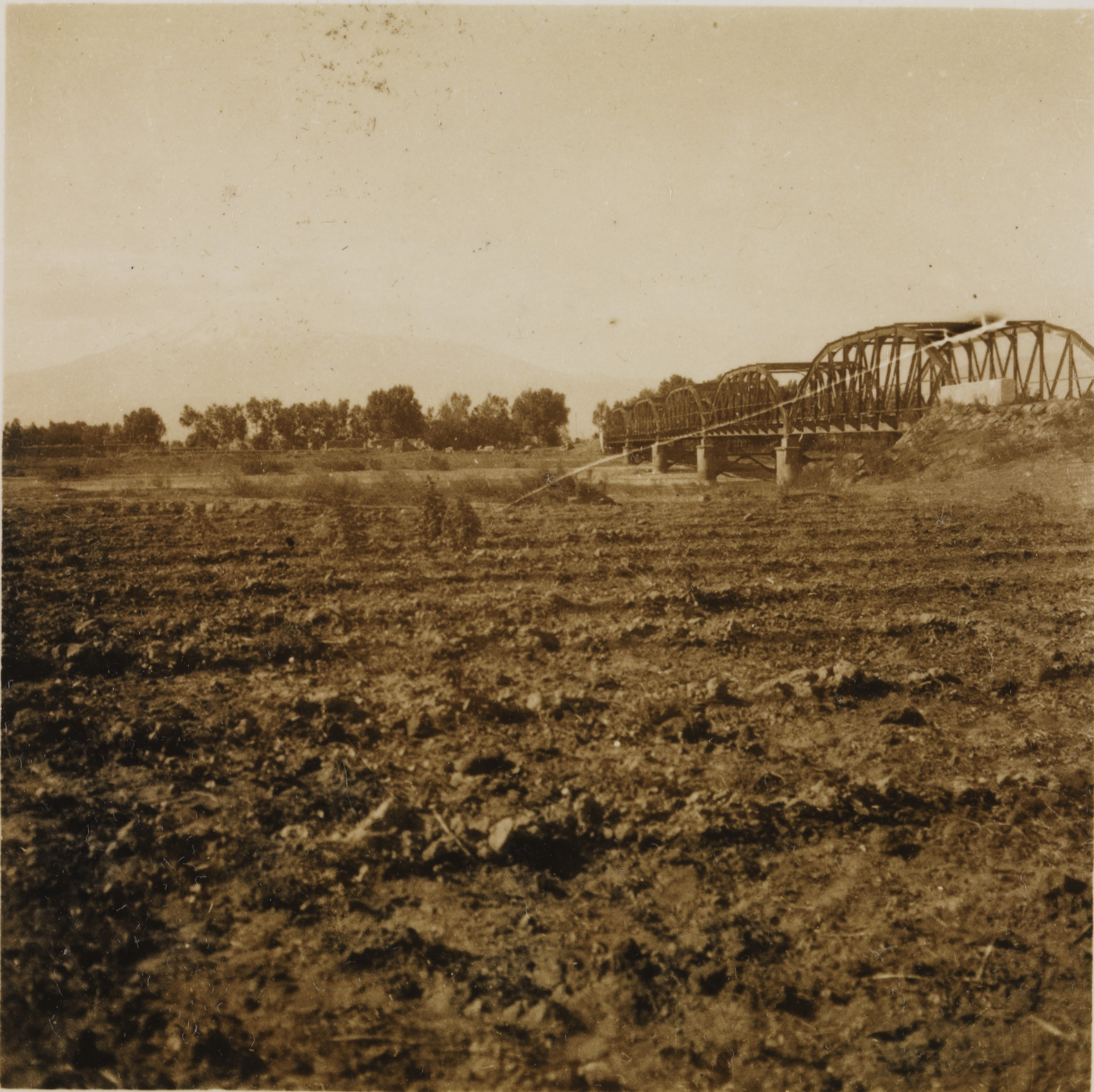
Bridge over Arax at Margara in 1925.

Margara (Armenian: Մարգարա, also Romanized as Markara; formerly Margara-Gök) is a village in the Armavir Province of Armenia. Margara is the closest border crossing to Turkey from Yerevan, though Turkey closed the border with Armenia in 1993. The village is located on the other side of Alican. Margara has a road bridge across the Arax River to Turkey. The Margara border crossing was guarded by guards of the Russian Federal Security Service from 1992 to 2025. The Border Guard Service of Armenia patrols this crossing between Armenia and Turkey.

== History ==
The border crossing was fully renovated on the Armenian side in 2024 in preparation for opening the land border between Turkey and Armenia for citizens of third countries and diplomatic passport holders, as per an agreement reached in 2022. The agreement is yet to be implemented.

In 2023, the border crossing briefly reopened to allow the passage of humanitarian aid following the Turkey–Syria earthquake for the first time since 1988.

In March 2025, the Margara border crossing again opened for 10 days to allow for humanitarian aid deliveries from Armenia to Syria.

== See also ==
- Armavir Province
