= Tlik =

Tlik Թլիկ
- Location within Armenia Location within Aragatsotn
- Coordinates: 40°24′N 43°37′E
- Country: Armenia
- Province: Aragatsotn
- Municipality: Arevut
- Elevation: 1,345 m (4,413 ft)

Population (2011)
  - Total: 123
- Time zone: UTC+4
  - Summer (DST): UTC+5

Tlik (Armenian: Թլիկ) is a village in the Arevut Municipality of the Aragatsotn Province of Armenia, near the Armenia–Turkey border. The majority of the inhabitants are Yezidis.
