= Akhurik =

Village in Shirak, Armenia

Akhurik Ախուրիկ
- Location within Armenia Location within Shirak
- Coordinates: 40°45′00″N 43°47′00″E
- Country: Armenia
- Province: Shirak
- Municipality: Akhuryan
- Elevation: 1,470 m (4,820 ft)

Population (2010)
  - Total: 1,243
- Time zone: UTC+4
  - Summer (DST): UTC+5
- Climate: Dfb

Akhurik (Armenian: Ախուրիկ) is a village in the Akhuryan Municipality of the Shirak Province of Armenia near the Armenia–Turkey border. The Statistical Committee of Armenia reported its population was 1,236 in 2010, up from 1,163 at the 2001 census.

== Demographics ==
Historical population
Year	Pop.	±% p.a.
1886	410	—
1897	484	+1.52%
1926	739	+1.47%
1939	1,119	+3.24%
1959	941	−0.86%
1970	1,137	+1.73%
1979	1,107	−0.30%
2001	1,163	+0.22%
2011	1,243	+0.67%
