= Karakoyunlu District =

District of Iğdır Province, Turkey

- District
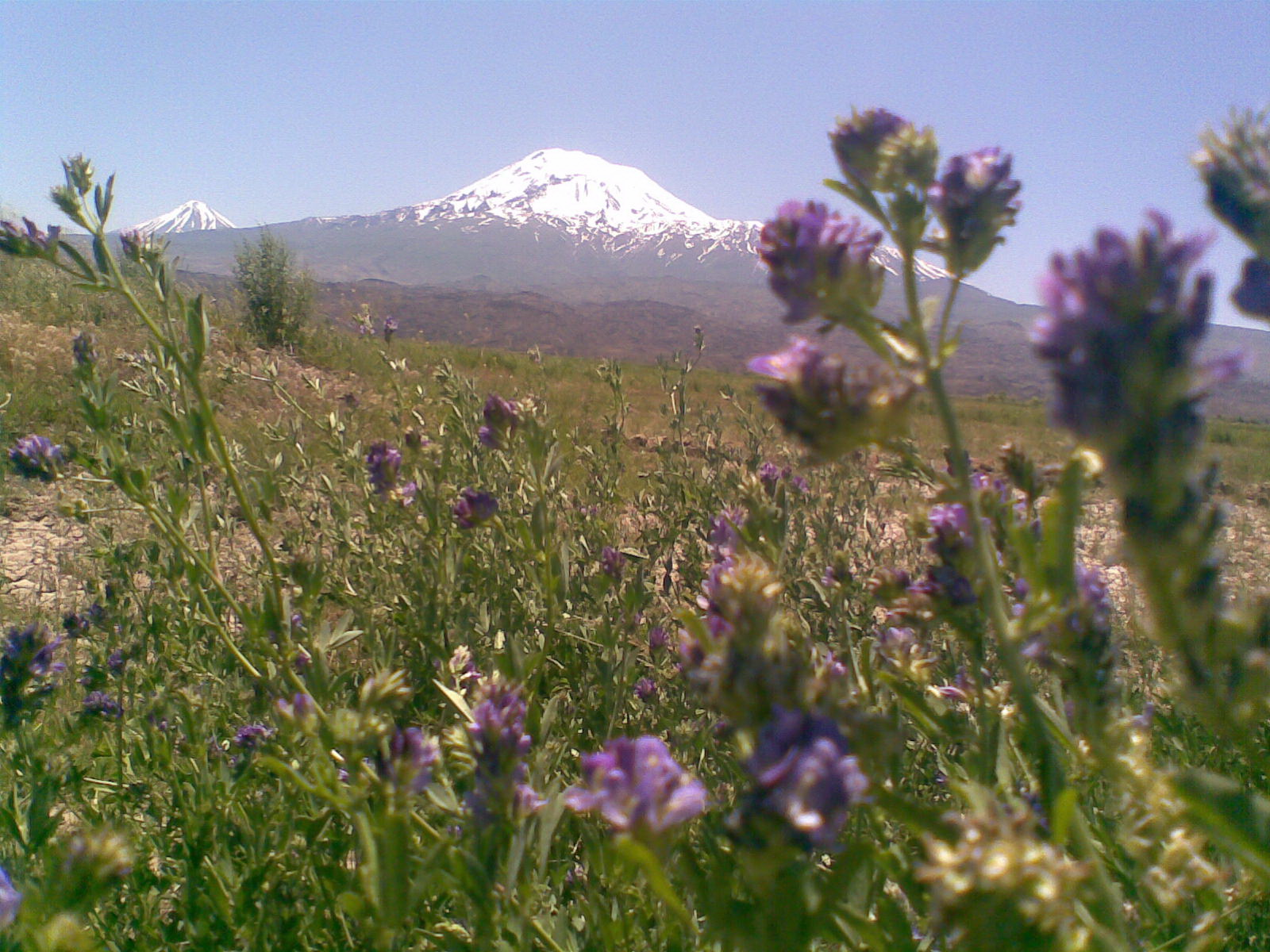
- Mt. Ararat (Ağrı Dağı), from Bulakbaşı, Iğdır

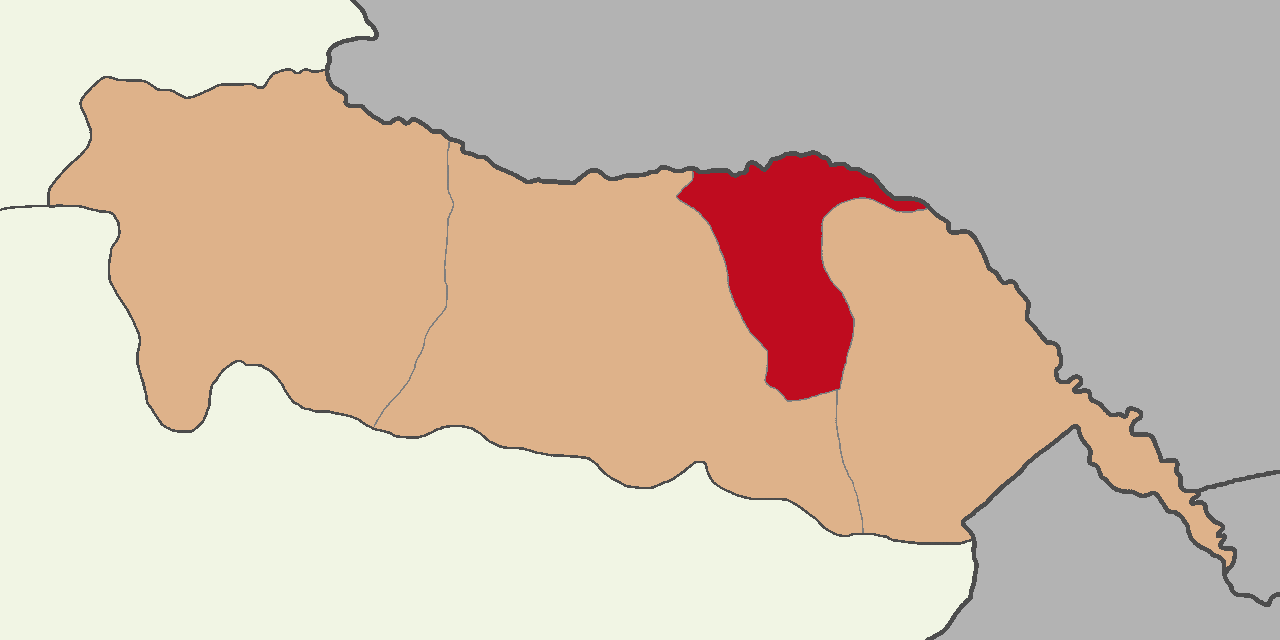
- Map showing Karakoyunlu District in Iğdır Province

- Location within Turkey
- Coordinates: 39°58′N 44°10′E
- Country: Turkey
- Province: Iğdır
- Seat: Karakoyunlu

Government
  - Kaymakam: Furkan Atalık
- Area: 269 km^{2} (104 sq mi)
- Population (2022): 13,565
  - Density: 50.4/km^{2} (131/sq mi)
- Time zone: UTC+3 (TRT)
- Website: www.karakoyunlu.gov.tr

Karakoyunlu District is a district of the Iğdır Province of Turkey. Its seat is the town of Karakoyunlu. Its area is 269 km^{2}, and its population is 13,565 (2022). The northern portion of the district forms part of the international border between Turkey and Armenia.

== Composition ==
There is one municipality in Karakoyunlu District:

- Karakoyunlu

There are 19 villages in Karakoyunlu District:

- Aktaş
- Aşağıalican
- Bayatdoğanşalı
- Bekirhanlı
- Bulakbaşı
- Cennetabat
- Gökçeli
- Gölköy
- İslamköy
- Kaçardoğanşalı
- Kerimbeyli
- Koçkıran
- Mürşitali
- Orta Alican
- Şıracı
- Taşburun
- Yazlık
- Yukarıalican
- Zülfikarköy
