= Aygavan =

Aygavan Այգավան
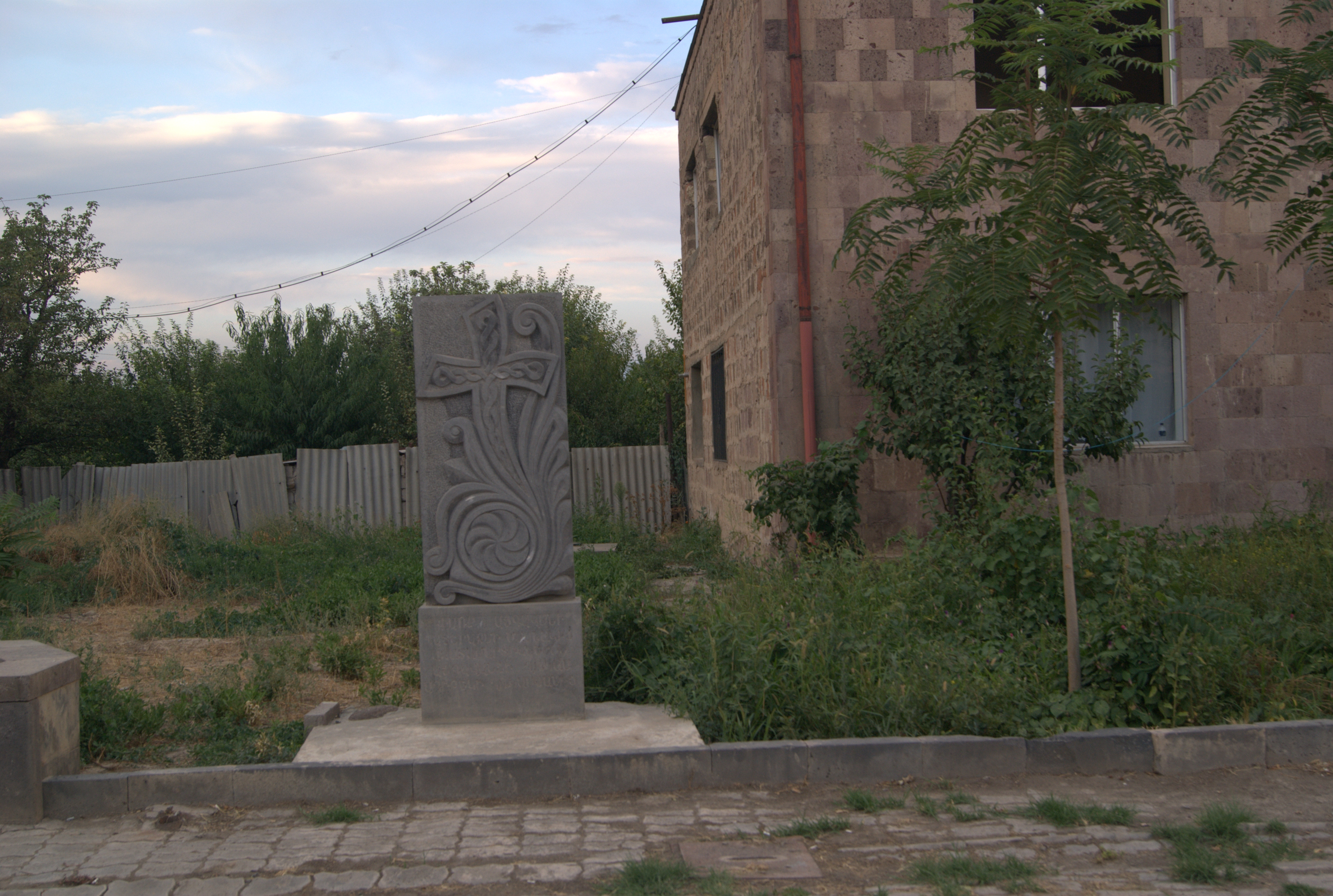
- Khachkar in Aygavan

- Location within Armenia Location within Ararat
- Coordinates: 39°51′53″N 44°40′13″E
- Country: Armenia
- Province: Ararat
- Municipality: Vedi
- Founded: 1828

Government
  - Mayor: Vigen Harutyunyan

Area
  - Total: 21.23 km^{2} (8.20 sq mi)

Population (2017)
  - Total: 4,569
- Time zone: UTC+4 (AMT)

Aygavan (Armenian: Այգավան) is a village in the Vedi Municipality of the Ararat Province of Armenia, located on the Yerevan-Meghri highway, near the Yerevan-Nakhchivan railway, at a height of 840 meters above sea level.

== Etymology ==
The village is also known as Aygevan.

== History ==
Archaeologists have uncovered various antiquities around the village dated between 10 BCE and 8 BCE, such as clay pots and livestock of the early farmers of the area. The village was founded in 1828 and renamed Aygavan on April 4, 1946, when the Armenian SSR signed a decree to officially rename the village.

== Culture ==
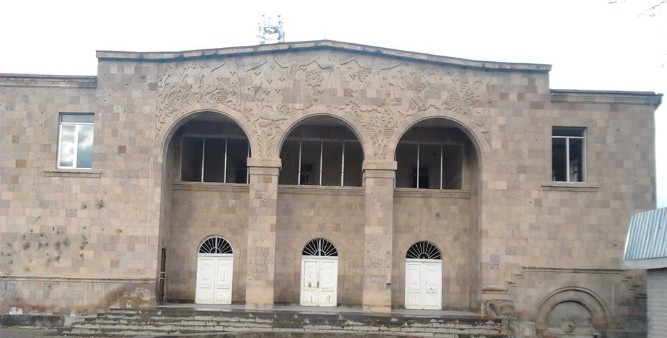
House of Culture in Aygavan

Aygavan has a middle school, a public library, a house of culture, an outpatient clinic and a post office.

== Industry ==
Aygavan has a wine factory that is a branch of Ararat Brandy. Its main headquarters are in Yerevan, and it has branches in three other areas in Armenia, in Aygavan, Armavir, and in Tavush, and produces the world’s number one exported Armenian brandy, ranked in the top 5 of imported brandies worldwide.

== Demographics ==
According to the 2017 official census, Aygavan has a population of 4,569, all Armenians, up from 3,914 in the 2011 census.

Population census

Year	Pop.	±%
1873	206	—
1914	467	+126.7%
1931	594	+27.2%
1959	1,992	+235.4%

Year	Pop.	±%
1979	3,013	+51.3%
2011	3,914	+29.9%
2017	4,569	+16.7%

== Gallery ==
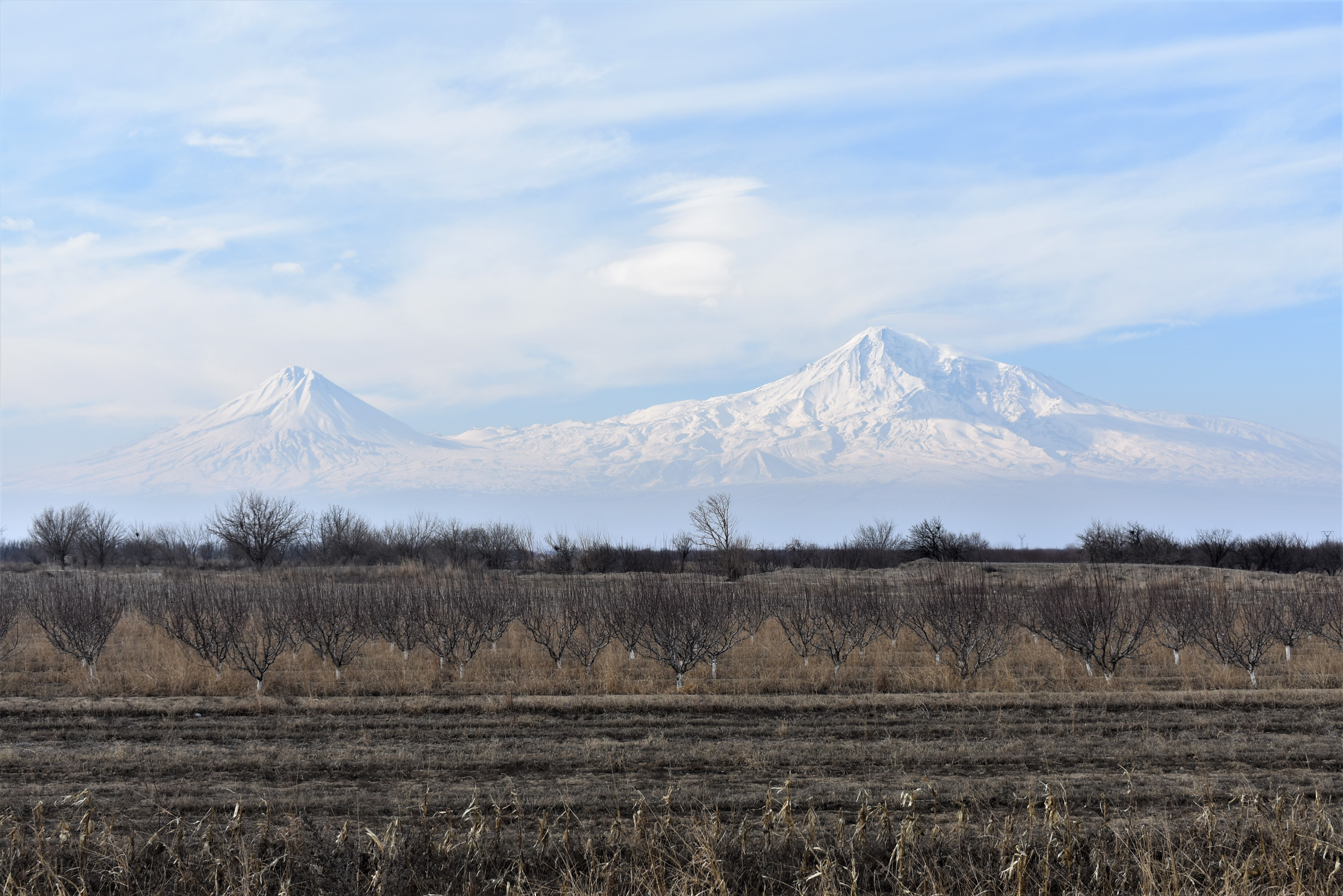
View of Ararat from Aygavan
