= Vanand, Armavir =

Village in Armavir, Armenia

Vanand Վանանդ
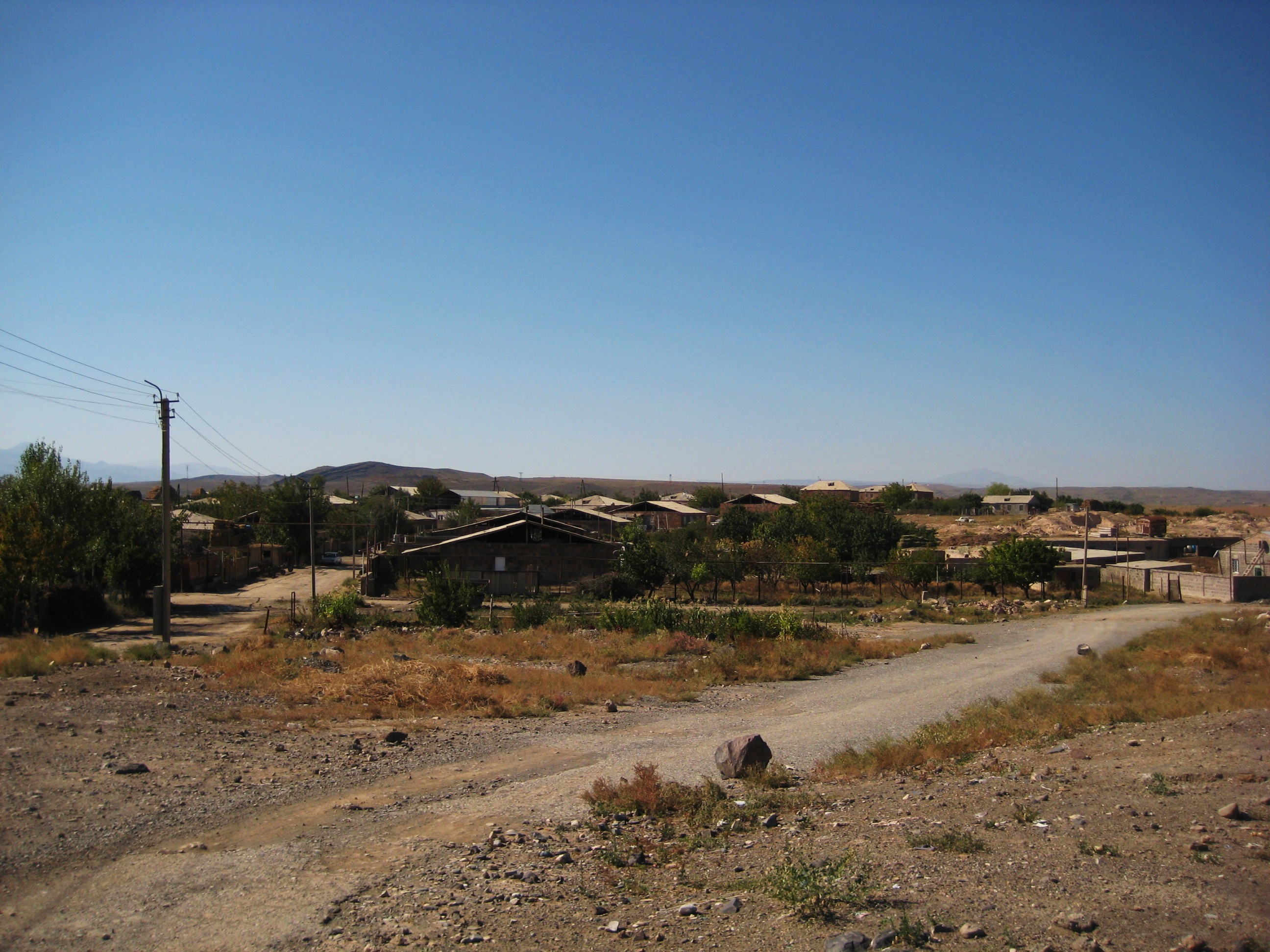
- The Village of Vanand.

- Location within Armenia
- Coordinates: 40°08′N 43°49′E
- Country: Armenia
- Marz (Province): Armavir
- Founded: 1984

Area
  - Total: 31.75 km^{2} (12.26 sq mi)
- Elevation: 980 m (3,220 ft)

Population (2011)
  - Total: 1,036
  - Density: 32.63/km^{2} (84.51/sq mi)
- Time zone: UTC+4 ( )
  - Summer (DST): UTC+5 ( )

Vanand (Armenian: Վանանդ) is a village located in the southwestern portion of the Armavir Province in Armenia, 5 kilometers from the Armenian border with Turkey. The village was founded in 1984 from a sovkhoz (collective farm), and was an area that was once closed to foreigners. There is a single school (179 students), house of culture, community center, kindergarten, and no cultural heritage monuments.

== See also ==
- Armavir Province
- Vanand, an area of historic Armenia
