= Karakoyunlu =

- Municipality
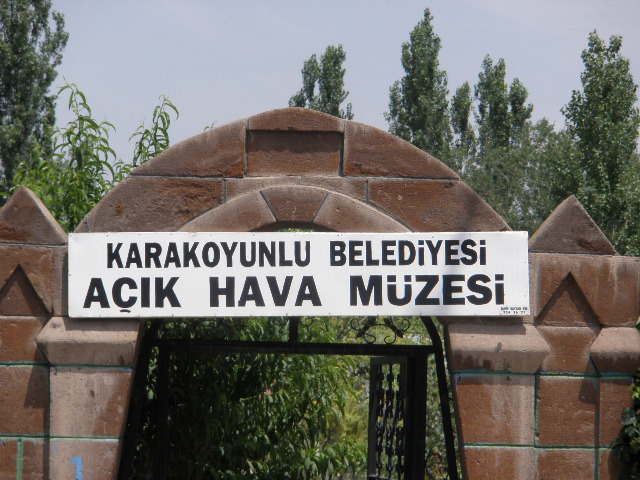

- Location within Turkey
- Coordinates: 39°58′21″N 44°10′22″E
- Country: Turkey
- Province: Iğdır
- District: Karakoyunlu

Government
  - Mayor: Bayramali Ballı (MHP)
- Elevation: 848 m (2,782 ft)
- Population (2022): 2,728
- Time zone: UTC+3 (TRT)
- Postal code: 76700
- Area code: 0476
- Website: www.karakoyunlu.bel.tr

Karakoyunlu is a town in Iğdır Province in the Eastern Anatolia region of Turkey. It is the seat of Karakoyunlu District. Its population is 2,728 (2022). The town is populated by Azerbaijanis.

== Population ==
Historical population
Year	Pop.	±% p.a.
1980	2,231	—
1985	2,813	+4.75%
1990	4,110	+7.88%
1997	5,159	+3.30%
2007	2,649	−6.45%
2012	2,664	+0.11%
2017	2,804	+1.03%
2022	2,728	−0.55%
Source: Population censuses (1980-1997) and TÜIK (2007-2022)
