= Aristarchus of Colchis =

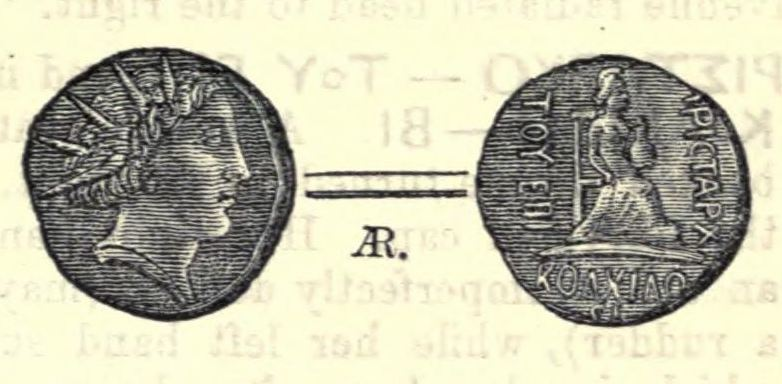
A drachm of Aristarchus as reproduced in Koehne, B., NC 17 (1877).

Aristarchus (/ˌærəˈstɑːrkəs/; Ancient Greek: Ἀρίσταρχος, Aristarkhos) was a ruler of Colchis as a client of Rome from 63 BC to c. 50 BC. He was installed by the Roman general Pompey as part of his settlement of Asia during the Mithridatic Wars. Aristarchus is principally known from the works of the 1st-century historian Appian as well as the coinage issued in his name.

== Biography ==
Aristarchus was appointed, in 63 BC, by Pompey on his conquest of Colchis, a region on the Black Sea, in the course of the Third Mithridatic War which pitted Rome against Mithridates VI of Pontus. Aristarchus's becoming "a dynast of the Colchians" is reported by Appian. The fact of appointment of a new ruler in Colchis is also known to Strabo, but he does not specify the dynast's name. As Aristarchus's extant drachms confirm he was "over Colchis", but he was not a king despite being so called by the 4th-century historian Eutropius.

Aristarchus was probably one of the local aristocrats, skeptouchoi ("sceptre-bearers"), who chose to side with the Romans during the war with Mithridates. The only other skeptouchos known by name, Olthaces, was made prisoner by Pompey and paraded in the streets of Rome as part of his triumphal procession. The extent of Aristarchus's possessions is not known. He could have sat at Phasis, at modern Poti, the end-point of Pompey's Colchian campaign, or Dioscurias, an important Hellenistic city, probably near modern-day Sukhumi, where one of his coins has been found. The year 12 on Aristarchus's coinage indicates that his rule in Colchis continued to at least 52 or 51 BC and probably later, until c. 47 BC, when the late king Mithridates's son, Pharnaces II, took advantage of a civil war in Rome and conquered Colchis.

== Coinage ==
Of the seven extant silver coins issued in the name of Aristarchus, one is located at the British Museum, Berlin, and Paris, two in the Hermitage Museum, one, unpublished, at Oxford's Ashmolean Museum, and one, in Tbilisi. The find-spot of only one of the Hermitage examples is known, near Sukhumi, and the other, near Igoeti in eastern Georgia in 2018. The obverse depicts a male head in a radiant crown, presumably Helios, but resembling Pompey. In the view of the Georgian numismatist Dundua, this depiction marries the traditional claim of the kings of Colchis to be descended from the sun-god to a political necessity to recognize Pompey as the source of Aristarchus's power. The seated female figure wearing a mural crown on the reverse is probably Tyche, a deity that governed the fortune and prosperity of a city, accompanied by the legend ΑΡΙΣΤΑΡΧΟ(Υ) ΤΟΥ ΕΠΙ ΚΟΛΧΙΔΟ(Σ).
