= Adobogiona (disambiguation) =

Adobogiona is the name of several Galatian princesses in the 1st century BC.

- Adobogiona, a Galatian queen, daughter of king Deiotarus, spouse of Brogitarus, and mother of Amyntas of Galatia
- Adobogiona the Elder, a mistress of king Mithridates VI of Pontus, mother of Mithridates of Pergamon and Adobogiona the Younger
- Adobogiona the Younger, an illegitimate daughter of king Mithridates VI of Pontus, mother of Deiotarus Philadelphus, the last king of Paphlagonia
