= Mithridates of Colchis =

Son of Mithridates VI Eupator of Pontus

Mithridates (fl. 83 BC) was a son of King Mithridates VI of Pontus and his sister-wife Laodice. He was made by his father ruler of Colchis on the Black Sea, but then removed and put to death on suspicion of disloyalty.

== First Mithridatic War ==
Mithridates was the eldest son of Mithridates VI Eupator, king of Pontus, and Laodice, whom the king had executed for unfaithfulness. Mithridates "the younger" served his father loyally in the first war with the Roman Republic and suffered defeat at the hands of the Roman commander Gaius Flavius Fimbria at the Rhyndacus in Asia Minor in 85 BC. The younger Mithridates fled to join his father at Pergamon, but both were then chased by Fimbria to Pitane, from where the two Mithridates managed to escape by sea.

== Ruler of Colchis ==
After the war, Mithridates VI had to deal with disturbances among his remote subjects, including those in Colchis, a country on the eastern Black Sea coast. For the Pontic monarchy, Colchis was a key possession, which supplied both manpower and raw materials. The Colchians, dissatisfied with the previous administration of their country, requested that the king send his eldest son and heir, Mithridates, as their ruler. When Eupator conceded, the Colchians returned to their allegiance. The appointment of Mithridates the Younger as ruler of Colchis probably was of the same nature as the simultaneous installment of another son, Machares, as viceroy of Bosporus. Mithridates of Colchis may have issued his own coinage, such as a horde of at least 119 bronze coins found at Vani, Georgia.

The younger Mithridates's reign in Colchis was received with such a demonstration of favor from his new subjects as to excite the jealousy of his father. According to the Roman historian Appian, the king of Pontus suspected that the developments in Colchis were brought about by his son "through his own ambition to be king." (App. Mith. 9.64). Eupator recalled his son, placed him in confinement, bound in golden fetters, and later had him killed. A trusted official from Amaseia, Moaphernes, a great-uncle of the geographer Strabo, was sent to administer Colchis.
