= Mithridate (Racine) =

Tragedy by Jean Racine

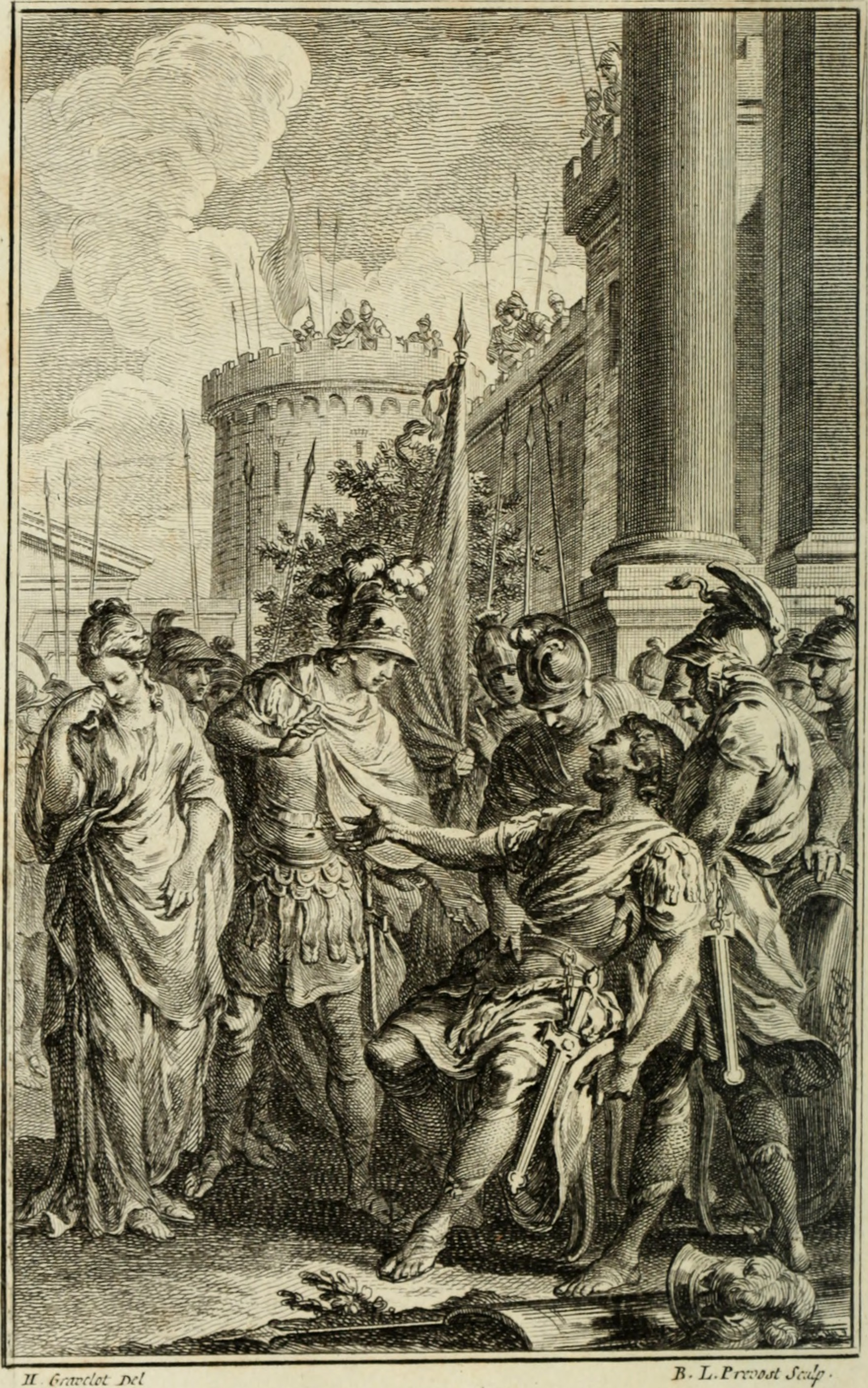
Illustration to Racine's play

Mithridate is a tragedy in five acts (with respectively 5, 6, 6, 7, and 5 scenes) in alexandrine verse by Jean Racine.

== Background and history ==
First performed on January 13, 1673 at the Hotel de Bourgogne, Mithridates follows Bajazet and precedes Iphigénie in Racine's work. The subject is drawn from ancient history. Mithridates VI Eupator reigned over the kingdom of Pontus, around the Black Sea. Famous for having gradually accustomed to poisons through mithridatism, he long resisted the Romans. He finally killed himself after being betrayed by his own son.

Racine shows several episodes of the life of Mithridates in one day and, as usual, gives great importance to the amorous intrigues. However, the epic is still more prevalent than in other tragedies. In terms of style, the piece is distinguished by a large number of long speeches and monologues.

Mithridates was the favorite tragedy of another great king, Louis XIV. Over the centuries, the play has become increasingly rare on stage. Today, it is one of the least performed works of Racine. The play formed the basis for Mozart's opera Mitridate, re di Ponto (1770).

== Plot ==
- Act 1 - Xiphares, a son of Mithridates, has just learned of the death of his father and the risk of a future Roman victory. He fears a betrayal of his brother Pharnaces, who has always supported the Romans. Xiphares sees Monime, fiance of Mithridates, to whom he declares his love. Pharnaces then inherits the kingdom of his father and his fiance. We then learn that while Mithridates is not dead, he is very close. Xiphares and Pharnaces then enter into a pact to stand by each other.
- Act 2 - Monime cannot find the strength to accommodate Mithridates as it should. The king receives a second confirmation of the treachery of his son Pharnaces. He announces his intention to run. Furthermore, Monima is forced to marry Mithridates, but is suspected to love Pharnaces. Monime finally tells Xiphares she loves him, but she is determined to follow the wishes of Mithridates.
- Act 3 - Mithridates will attempt to invade Italy to strike the enemy's heart. Xiphares approves the project and wants to participate. Mithridates orders Pharnaces to marry the daughter of a Parthian king. Pharnaces refuses. Mithridates has him arrested and fears a betrayal of Xiphares. Xiphares's love is revealed. To set a trap, Mithridates tells Monime he wants her to marry Xiphares and her reaction is that she loves Xiphares.
- Act 4 - Xiphares, who knows he has been discovered, wants to escape, but Monime reveals that there is another who showed their love to Mithridates. The latter decides to marry Monime before leaving for Italy in exchange for his forgiveness, but does not know whether to punish Xiphares or Monime, or neither. Meanwhile, Pharnaces reveals the plan of attack from Italy to the Romans, who have landed.
- Act 5 - The Romans attack the palace. A servant brings Mithridates and Monime poison so that they can commit suicide and there is a rumor that Xiphares has died. Mithridates, who is defeated, is pierced by a sword in pardoning Monime. Xiphares, meanwhile, managed to repel the attack of the Romans. Before dying, Mithridates, proud of the final victory of his son, unites Monime and Xiphares and advise them to flee.
