= Skeptouchos =

Skēptouchos (Greek: σκηπτοῦχος), plural skēptouchoi (σκηπτοῦχοι) is a term known from ancient Greek sources, usually translated as the one bearing a staff, baton, or sceptre.

The term skeptouchos occurs in various contexts as early as the Homeric poetry where it is an epithet to a "king", basileus. In Homer's poems, a sceptre is also carried by priests and prophets, heralds, and judges. Its function was interpreted in early scholarship as a speaker's attribute during assemblies, but, according to Daniel Unruh, the sceptre apparently served as a physical symbol of authority which could be used to inflict a humiliating punishment. The term skeptouchos also appears in the 7th-century BC Semonides.

In his Cyropaedia and Anabasis, Xenophon in the 5th-century BC makes references to skeptouchoi as officials at the Persian court, commonly eunuchs. Xenophon mentions Artapates, a loyal chief of the skeptouchoi, who accompanied Cyrus the Younger in Asia Minor. Skeptouchoi were responsible for supplies, organizational matters and order at the Persian court. No equivalent term has been identified in Elamite, Old Persian, or Semitic, but the visual representation of skeptouchoi are preserved in the sculptures of Persepolis.

Skeptouchoi also appears as a Greek appellation of local princes of the Scythians, as referenced in a c. 200 BC inscription from Olbia, and in Colchis prior to Mithridates Eupator's conquest, as reported by Strabo. As David Braund suggests, the title was probably the consequence of Persian influence in Colchis. Still later, around AD 104, skeptouchoi refers to beadles at the temple of Artemis in the foundation inscription of Salutaris from Ephesus.
