= Laodice (sister-wife of Mithridates VI of Pontus) =

Pontic Princess and Queen

- Born: 130 or 129 BC
- Died: c. 90 BC (aged c. 40)
- Father: Mithridates V
- Mother: Laodice VI

Laodice (130 or 129 BC – c. 90 BC) was a Pontic Princess and Queen who was first wife and sister to King Mithridates VI of Pontus. She was of Persian and Greek ancestry.

== Early life ==
Her father was assassinated around 120 BC in Sinope, poisoned at a lavish banquet he was hosting. In the will of her father, Mithridates V left the kingdom to the joint rule of her mother and her brothers: Mithridates VI and Mithridates Chrestus. The brothers of Laodice were both too young to rule and their mother retained all power as regent. Laodice VI's regency over Pontus was from 120–116 BC (even perhaps up to 113 BC). Laodice VI favoured Mithridates Chrestus over Mithridates VI.

Between 116 and 113 BC, Mithridates VI returned to Pontus from hiding and was hailed as King. He was able to remove his mother and brother from the Pontic throne and became the sole ruler of Pontus. Mithridates VI showed clemency towards his mother and brother, but imprisoned them both. Laodice VI died in prison of natural causes. However, Mithridates Chrestus may have died in prison from natural causes or was tried for treason and was executed on his orders. When they died, Mithridates VI gave his mother and brother royal funerals.

== Queen of Pontus ==
When Mithridates VI became the sole ruler of Pontus, Laodice and her brother were practically strangers. The last time Mithridates VI had seen Laodice, she was a young girl. Sometime after Mithridates VI became sole King of Pontus, he married her. Through their marriage, Laodice became a Queen of Pontus.

Laodice bore her brother four sons: Mithridates, Arcathius, Machares, Pharnaces II of Pontus and two daughters: Cleopatra of Pontus and Drypetina (a diminutive form of "Drypetis").

Laodice and Mithridates VI set about establishing good relations with the citizens of Athens and the Greek island of Delos. Laodice and her brother-husband made benefactions to the Athenians and the Delians. The exact nature of their benefactions and their voluntary donations are unknown. On Delos, honorific statues have survived that have been identified to be of Mithridates VI and Laodice.

== Death ==
During Mithridates' absences, Laodice had lovers. Laodice became pregnant and gave birth to a son. To conceal her unfaithfulness to Mithridates VI, Laodice plotted to have her husband poisoned.

However, Mithridates returned to Pontus suddenly and without warning, catching Laodice with her lovers. Her brother-husband was shocked and distressed. However, he hid his rage and embraced Laodice. Festive banquets were prepared to welcome him back.

Prior to the feast, Mithridates VI's servants warned him of Laodice's plots and they named Laodice's co-conspirators. Feeling betrayed, Mithridates cursed his late mother for raising such a treacherous daughter, and had Laodice and her collaborators executed immediately, although he spared Laodice's new born son.

== Arts & literature ==
There is a painting on display at the Bibliothèque nationale de France of Laodice and Mithridates. The painting is titled Mithridates poisons Laodice, his wife/sister; Mithridates wins a duel.

In The Grass Crown, the second in the Masters of Rome series, Colleen McCullough, the Australian writer, describes in detail the various aspects of Mithridates VI's life.

== Sources ==
- A. Mayor, The Poison King: the life and legend of Mithradates, Rome's deadliest enemy, Princeton University Press, 2009
- M. Getzel, Hellenistic settlements in Europe, the islands and Asia Minor, Cohen University of California Press, 1995
- "Dictionary of Greek and Roman Biography and Mythology, page 719 (v. 2)" web.archive.org 2010-11-20. Retrieved 2019-09-17.
