= Monime =

Macedonian Greek noblewoman

Monime, sometimes known as Monima (Greek: Μονίμη; died 72/71 BC), was a Macedonian Greek noblewoman from Anatolia and one of the wives of King Mithridates VI of Pontus.

According to the ancient sources she was a citizen of either Miletus or Stratonicea, Caria. Monime was the daughter of a prominent citizen called Philopoemen. Monime was a beautiful, intelligent woman and was much talked about among the Greeks.

When King Mithridates VI of Pontus and his army successfully captured her native city in 89/88 BC, her beauty made a great impression on Mithridates VI. He was strongly drawn to her, as he was attracted to powerful personalities whose intelligence complemented his. Mithridates VI thought of making Monime the jewel of his harem, and began negotiations with Philopoemen. Mithridates VI offered him 1500 gold pieces. Monime rejected the offer and held out for more. Monime demanded from Mithridates VI a marriage contract and insisted that he give her a royal Diadem and the title of Queen. Because he found Monime irresistible, Mithridates VI agreed.

The royal scribes prepared the marriage contract. Mithridates VI tied a purple and gold ribbon around the head of Monime, the pair withdrew to the private rooms of the palace at Sinope. They married in 89/88 BC and through her marriage to Mithridates VI, Monime became his second wife and Queen of Pontus. Her father received his gold from Mithridates VI and was appointed overseer in Ephesus. Monime bore Mithridates VI a child, a daughter called Athenais.

In the beginning of their marriage, she exercised great influence over her husband; however this did not last long. In the end they had an unhappy marriage and he later became dissatisfied with her. Monime later repented her marriage to Mithridates VI, her elevation, and leaving her native city.

In 72/71 BC, when her husband was compelled to abandon his dominions and took refuge in the Kingdom of Armenia, Monime was put to death at Pharnacia. Her correspondence to Mithridates VI, which was of a licentious character, fell into the hands of Roman General Pompey at the capture of the fortress at Caenon Phrourion.

== In fiction ==
Monime is a character in Racine's five-act tragedy Mithridate. The actresses Marie Champmeslé and Rachel played the part of Monime.

She is also a character in Steven Saylor's novel Wrath of the Furies.

She is characterized as an albino in Colleen McCollough’s novel The Grass Crown.

== Sources ==
- https://web.archive.org/web/20110220182649/http://www.ancientlibrary.com/smith-bio/2220.html
- Mayor, A. (2009). The Poison King: the life and legend of Mithradates, Rome's deadliest enemy. Princeton University Press.
