= Mitridate, re di Ponto =

1770 opera by W. A. Mozart

- Opera seria by W. A. Mozart
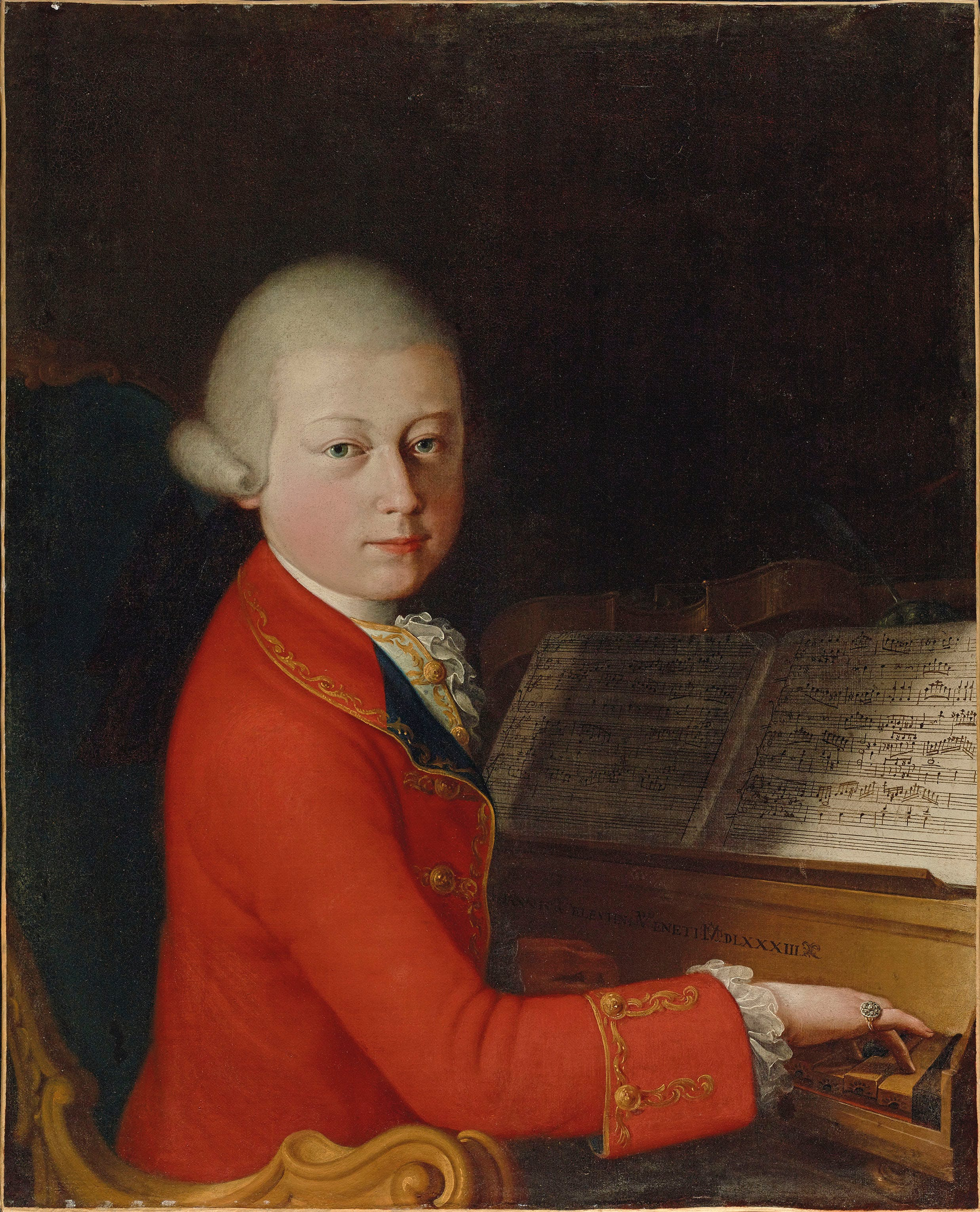
- 1770 Verona portrait of Mozart
- Librettist: Vittorio Amedeo Cigna-Santi
- Language: Italian
- Based on: Mithridate by Jean Racine
- Premiere: 26 December 1770; Teatro Regio Ducale, Milan

Mitridate, re di Ponto (Mithridates, King of Pontus), K. 87 (74a), is an opera seria in three acts by the young Wolfgang Amadeus Mozart. The libretto is by Vittorio Amedeo Cigna-Santi, after Giuseppe Parini's Italian translation of Jean Racine's play Mithridate.

Mozart wrote Mitridate while touring Italy in 1770. The musicologist Daniel E. Freeman has demonstrated that it was composed with close reference to the opera La Nitteti by Josef Mysliveček. The latter was the opera being prepared for production in Bologna when Mozart met Mysliveček for the first time with his father in March 1770. Mysliveček visited the Mozarts frequently in Bologna during the summer of 1770 while Wolfgang was working on Mitridate. Mozart gained expertise in composition from his older friend and also incorporated some of his musical motifs into his own operatic setting. The opera was first performed at the Teatro Regio Ducale, Milan, on 26 December 1770 (at the Milan Carnival). It was a success, performed 21 times despite doubts because of Mozart's extreme youth – he was fourteen at the time. No revival took place until the 20th century. The opera features virtuoso arias for the principal roles, but only two ensemble numbers: the act 2 ending duet between Aspasia and Sifare ("Se viver non degg'io"), and the brief quintet that ends the opera in a manner characteristic of standard baroque opera seria where the opera ends with a short coro or tutti number.

== Roles ==
Roles, voice types, premiere cast
Role	Voice type	Premiere cast, 26 December 1770 Conductor: W. A. Mozart
Arbate, Governor of Nymphæa	soprano castrato	Pietro Muschietti
Sifare or Xiphares, Mitridate's son	soprano castrato	Pietro Benedetti (Sartorino)
Aspasia, the Queen, pledged in marriage to Mitridate	soprano	Antonia Bernasconi
Farnace or Pharnaces, Mitridate's eldest son	alto castrato	Giuseppe Cicognani
Marzio or Marcius, Roman legionary officer	tenor	Gasparo Bassano
Mitridate, King of Pontus	tenor	Guglielmo d'Ettore
Ismene, Parthian Princess	soprano	Anna Francesca Varese

== Synopsis ==
Place: around the Crimean port of Nymphæum
Time: 63BC during the conflict between Rome and Pontus

=== Prologue ===
Mitridate, having suffered a heavy defeat in battle, is presumed dead. This incorrect news is passed by Arbate, the Governor, to Aspasia (Mitridate's fiancée) and to Farnace and Sifare (Mitridate's sons).

=== Act 1 ===
Scene 1

Arbate, the governor of Nymphæum, welcomes Sifare. We learn that Sifare resents his brother, Farnace, because of his brother's strong ties with their enemies, the Romans. Arbate pledges his loyalty to Sifare. Aspasia pleads for Sifare to help her against advances by Farnace. He accepts her plea and reveals his love for her.

Scene 2

Farnace makes his advances to Aspasia. She refuses, supported by Sifare, who protects her from his forceful brother. News arrives that Mitridate is alive and is approaching the city. Arbate urges the brothers to conceal their differences and greet their father. The brothers agree to hide their feelings for Aspasia. Farnace conspires with Marzio, Roman legionary officer, against Mitridate.

Scene 3

Mitridate arrives on the shores of Nymphæum with Princess Ismene, daughter of his ally the King of Parthia. Mitridate wants Farnace to marry Ismene, his promised bride. Ismene is in love with Farnace but senses problems and is worried about her future. Arbate tells Mitridate that Farnace is pursuing Aspasia, not mentioning Sifare. The jealous Mitridate swears revenge on Farnace.

=== Act 2 ===
Scene 1

Farnace scorns and threatens Ismene. She tells Mitridate, who suggests that she should marry Sifare. Mitridate asks Aspasia for immediate marriage but she hesitates, proving to him that she is unfaithful. Aspasia confesses love to Sifare but they both agree to part to save their honour. Sifare plans to leave and Aspasia is troubled by the conflict between love and duty.

Scene 2

Mitridate is aware of Farnace's plot against him with the Romans; he plans his revenge, despite Marzio's offer of peace, and arrests Farnace to execute him. Ismene rescues the prince, who admits his treachery but implicates Sifare. Mitridate tricks Aspasia into admitting her love for Sifare and swears revenge. Aspasia and Sifare wish to die together, in fear of Mitridate's threats.

=== Act 3 ===
Scene 1

Ismene, still in love with Farnace, tries to convince Mitridate to forgive Aspasia. The Romans attack and Mitridate leaves for battle. Aspasia contemplates suicide by poison. Sifare also wants to die, and joins his father in the battle.

Scene 2

Marzio liberates Farnace and promises him the rule of Nymphæum. Farnace changes his mind, deciding to side with Mitridate.

Scene 3

Defeated, Mitridate commits suicide, avoiding captivity. Before he dies he gives his blessing to Sifare and Aspasia and forgives Farnace, who now agrees to marry Ismene. All four pledge to free the world from Rome.

== Noted arias ==
Act 1

- "Soffre il mio cor con pace" – Sifare
- "Nel sen mi palpita" – Aspasia
- "Parto : nel gran cimento" – Sifare
- "Quel ribelle" – Mitridate
- "Se di lauri" – Mitridate
- "In faccia all'oggetto" – Ismene
- "L'odio nel cor" – Arbate
- "Al destin che la minaccia" – Aspasia
- "Soffre il mio cor" – Sifare
- "Venga pur, minacci" – Farnace

Act 2

- "Già di pietà mi spoglio" – Mitridate
- "Lungi da te" – Sifare
- "Nel grave tormento" – Aspasia
- "So quanto a te" – Ismene
- "Son reo; l'error confesso" – Farnace
- "Tu che fedel" – Mitridate
- "Va, l'error mio palesa" – Farnace

Act 3

- "Ah ben ne fui presaga…Pallid' ombre" – Aspasia
- "Già dagli occhi" – Farnace
- "Se di regnar" – Marzio
- "Se il rigor d'ingrata sorte" – Sifare
- "Tu sai per che m'accese" – Ismene
- "Vado incontro" – Mitridate

In 1901, Charles Malherbe located previously uncatalogued works of Mozart, including a soprano aria from Mitridate. It was performed that year in Paris by Camille Fourrier.

== Recordings ==
- 1971: Mozarteum concert hall, Salzburg; Mozarteum Orchestra Salzburg, Leopold Hager/Edda Moser, Arleen Auger, Helen Watts, Pilar Lorengar, Peter Schreier, Peter Baillie, Reingard Didusch (CD)
- 1977: Mozarteum, Salzburg; Mozarteum Orchestra Salzburg, Leopold Hager; Werner Hollweg, Arleen Auger, Edita Gruberová, Agnes Baltsa, Ileana Cotrubaș, David Kübler, Christine Weidinger; Deutsche Grammophon (CD, 1991)
- 1986: Jean-Pierre Ponnelle 1986 film, Nikolaus Harnoncourt, Concentus Musicus Wien; Gösta Winbergh, Yvonne Kenny, Ann Murray; Deutsche Grammophon (DVD)
- 1986: Opéra de Lyon (Jean-Claude Fall, director), Theodor Guschlbauer/Rockwell Blake, Ashley Putnam, Yvonne Kenny, Brenda Boozer; EuroArts (DVD)
- 1993: Royal Opera House, Paul Daniel/Bruce Ford, Jochen Kowalski, Ann Murray, Ľuba Orgonášová (DVD)
- 1997 Salzburg Mozart Week, Roger Norrington/Bruce Ford, Vesselina Kasarova, Cyndia Sieden, Christiane Oelze (CD)
- 1998: Christophe Rousset/Giuseppe Sabbatini, Brian Asawa, Cecilia Bartoli, Natalie Dessay (CD)
- 2001: Musica ad Rhenum, Jed Wentz/Marcel Reijans, Francine van der Heyden, Marijje van Stralen, Johannette Zomer (CD)
- 2006: Salzburg Festival, Marc Minkowski/Richard Croft, Bejun Mehta, Miah Persson (DVD)
- 2013: The Orchestra of Classical Opera, Ian Page/Barry Banks, Miah Persson, Sophie Bevan (CD)
- 2016: Emmanuelle Haïm (dir.) Le Concert d'Astrée, Michael Spyres, Patricia Petibon, Myrtò Papatanasiu, Christophe Dumaux, Sabine Devieilhe, Cyrille Dubois, Jaël Azzaretti; Clément Hervieu-Léger (staging); (2017 Erato DVD)
- 2020: Les Musiciens du Louvre, Marc Minkowski, Michael Spyres, Julie Fuchs, Sabine Devieilhe, Elsa Dreisig, Paul-Antoine Bénos-Djian, Adriana Bignani Lesca, Cyrille Dubois (CD)
