= Sanigs =

Ancient tribe in the western Caucasus

Sanigi
Regions with significant populations
- Northeastern Black Sea coast

The Sanigs (Greek: Σάνιγκι) were a tribe inhabiting historical Heniochia, northwest shore of Kingdom of Colchis. Their ethnic identity is obscure and is the subject of a controversy. They are first attested in the works of Pliny, Arrian and Memnon of Heraclea.

== Geography ==
Historical territories of Heniokhet-Sanigeti (Sanigia) was divided into three parts:

- Old southern Heniochia, later coastal Abkhazia (which included the coastal zone from Sokhumi to Adler);
- Inner Heniochia (Sochi district);
- North Heniochia, later Jiketi of Abkhazia (Tuapsi region).

Sanigs inhabited the Inner Heniochia

== Origin ==
Georgian scholars, as well as a number of foreign scholars, consider them to be Kartvelian people, such as Zans (ancestors of Mingrelian and Laz peoples) or proto-Svans. According to Arrian, they inhabited the area around Sebastopolis (modern Sokhumi). Roland Topchishvili links some modern Georgian surnames with the Sanigs (Sanikidze, Sanikiani, Sanigiani, Sanaia).

Abkhazians consider the Sanigs to be the ancestors of the Sadz and Zhaney, as evidenced by the territorial settlement of these peoples.
