= Drypetina =

Daughter of Mithridates VI (died c. 66 BC)

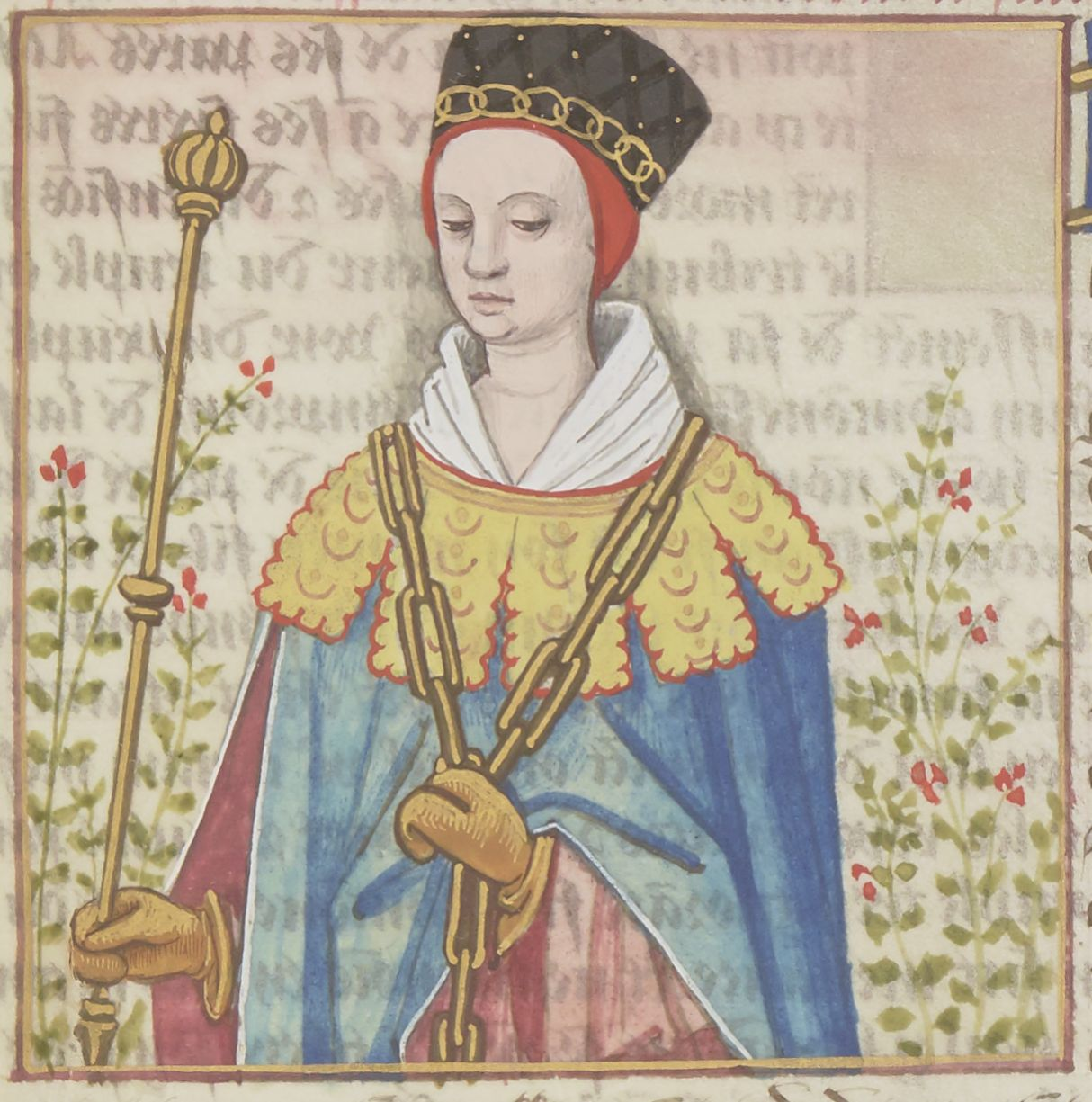
In De mulieribus claris

Drypetina, Dripetrua (died c. 66 BC) was a devoted daughter of King Mithridates VI of Pontus and his sister-wife Laodice.

== Biography ==
Her name is the diminutive form of the name of Drypetis, daughter of the Achaemenid king Darius III. She had a double row of teeth. According to Ammianus Marcellinus, during the Third Mithridatic War, Drypetina, severely ill, was left behind in the fortress of Sinora under the protection of the eunuch Menophilus. When the Roman forces under Mallius Priscus besieged the fortress, Menophilus killed the princess to prevent her from being captured by the Romans and then committed suicide (Amm. Marc. XVI.7.10). She appears in De Mulieribus Claris by Giovanni Boccaccio as "Dripetrua, queen of Laodicea".
