= Zygopolis =

Town in ancient Pontus

Zygopolis (Ancient Greek: Ζυγόπολις) was a town of ancient Pontus, in the neighbourhood of Colchis mentioned by Strabo. Stephanus of Byzantium conjectures that it was in the territory of the Zygii, which, however, does not agree with Strabo's description.

Its site is unlocated.
