= Colchis =

Historical region of Georgia

Coordinates: 42°N 42°E

Colchis ეგრისი Egrisi
- 13th century BC–131 AD
- Colchis and Iberia
- Capital: Aea
- Common languages: Zan; Svan; Greek (decrees, numismatics) many others
- Religion: Georgian paganism Greek polytheism Mithraism; Zoroastrianism
- Historical era: Iron Age, Classical antiquity
  - Consolidation of Colchian tribes: 13th century BC
  - Conquest of Diauehi: 750 BC
  - Two invasions of Sardur II of Urartu: 744/743 BC
  - Cimmerian and Scythian invasions: 720 BC
  - Conquest of Mithridates VI: After 70 BC
  - Disestablished: 131 AD
Preceded by	Succeeded by
Colchian culture; Diauehi	Lazica
- Today part of: Georgia; Russia; Turkey

In classical antiquity and Greco-Roman geography, Colchis (/ˈkɒlkɪs/; Ancient Greek: Κολχίς) was an exonym for the Georgian polity of Egrisi (Georgian: ეგრისი) located on the eastern coast of the Black Sea, centered in present-day western Georgia also including the region of Abkhazia.

Its population, the Colchians, are generally believed to have been primarily early Zan-speaking tribes, ancestral to the modern Laz and Mingrelian peoples. According to David Marshall Lang: "one of the most important elements in the modern Georgian nation, the Colchians were probably established in the Caucasus by the Middle Bronze Age."

It has been described in modern scholarship as "the earliest Georgian formation", which, along with the Kingdom of Iberia, would later contribute significantly to the development of the Kingdom of Georgia and the Georgian nation.

Colchis is known in Greek mythology as the destination of the Argonauts, as well as the home to Medea and the Golden Fleece. It was also described as a land rich with gold, iron, timber and honey that would export its resources mostly to ancient Hellenic city-states. Colchis likely had a diverse population. According to Greek and Roman sources, between 70 and 300 languages were spoken in Dioscourias (modern Sukhumi) alone.

Colchis territory is mostly assigned to what is now the western part of Georgia and encompasses the present-day Georgian provinces of Samegrelo, Imereti, Guria, Adjara, Svaneti, Racha; Abkhazia; modern Russia's Sochi and Tuapse districts; and present-day Turkey’s Artvin, Rize, and Trabzon provinces.

== Geography and toponyms ==
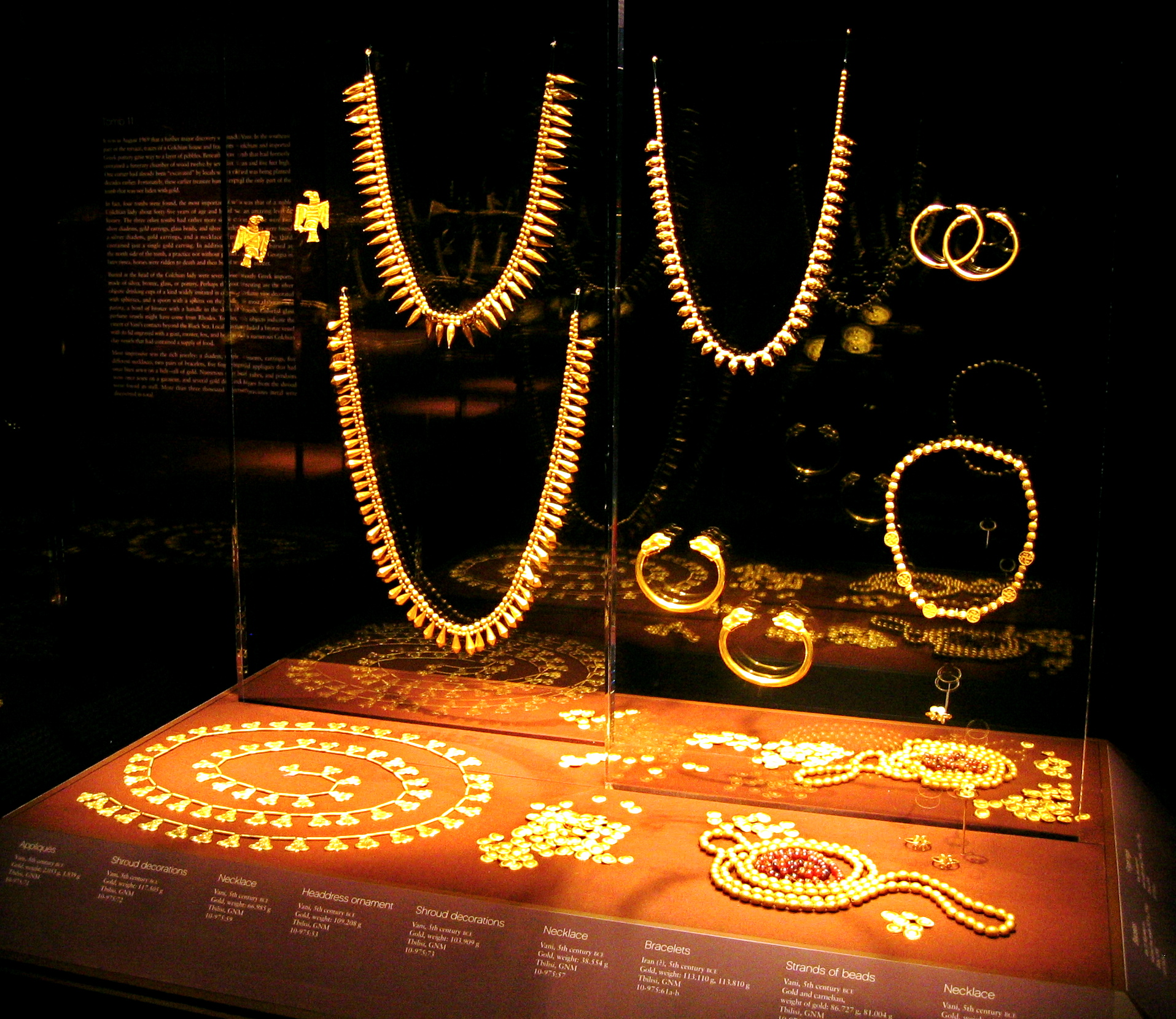
A collection of Colchian gold bracelets and necklaces found in Vani, western Georgia

Colchis, Kolkha, Qulḫa, or Kilkhi, which existed from the c. 13th to the 1st centuries BC, is regarded as an early ethnically Georgian polity; the name of the Colchians was used as the collective term for early Kartvelian tribes which populated the eastern coast of the Black Sea in Greco-Roman ethnography.

Ronald Grigor Suny identifies Colchis as an early Georgian state formation. Suny emphasizes that the Colchians were among the early Kartvelian-speaking tribes, the linguistic ancestors of modern Georgians. He highlights the cultural and political continuity between Colchis and later Georgian states, noting that Colchis, along with the eastern Georgian kingdom of Iberia, played a significant role in the ethnogenesis of the Georgian people.

Giorgi Melikishvili and Donald Rayfield believes that Colchis and their kings are mentioned in several Assyrian inscriptions. In several inscriptions about the campaigns of Tukulti-Ninurta I (1243–1207 BC), it is written that he defeated 40 kings of Nairi and watered the mountains and valleys with blood, and also mentions that he marched through the most difficult mountains that no Assyrian king had seen before. Other Assyrian inscriptions about this campaign mention "the 40 kings of the Nairi countries and the countries on the shores of the Upper Sea[Black Sea]" instead of "Nairi countries". In the inscriptions of Tiglath-Pileser I (1114–1076 BC), it is mentioned that 60 other kings came to the aid of the 23 kings of Nairi, who were too late and could not participate in the battle, so they retreated near the shores of the Upper Sea. Later, Tiglath-Pileser I went to fight the kings of the shores of the Upper Sea. In the Yonjalu inscription, Tiglath-Pileser I refers to himself as "the conqueror of the land of Nairi from Tume to Daiaeni[Diauehi], and from Gilḫi to the Upper Sea[Black Sea]". According to the author, Gilḫi should be read as Kilḫi, which means Kolkhis/Colchis.

According to Donald Rayfield, the ethnic makeup of Colchis is "obscure" and Kartvelian names "are conspicuously absent from the few anthronyms found in Colchian burials." Instead, Greek, Anatolian, Iranian, and possibly Abkhaz names are present.

The name Colchis is thought to have derived from the Urartian Qulḫa. In the mid-eighth century BC, Sarduri II, the King of Urartu, inscribed his victory over Qulḫa on a stele; however, the exact location of Qulḫa is disputed. Some scholars argue the name Qulḫa (Colchís) originally referred to a land to the west of Georgia. Others argue Qulḫa may have been located in the south, near modern Göle, Turkey.

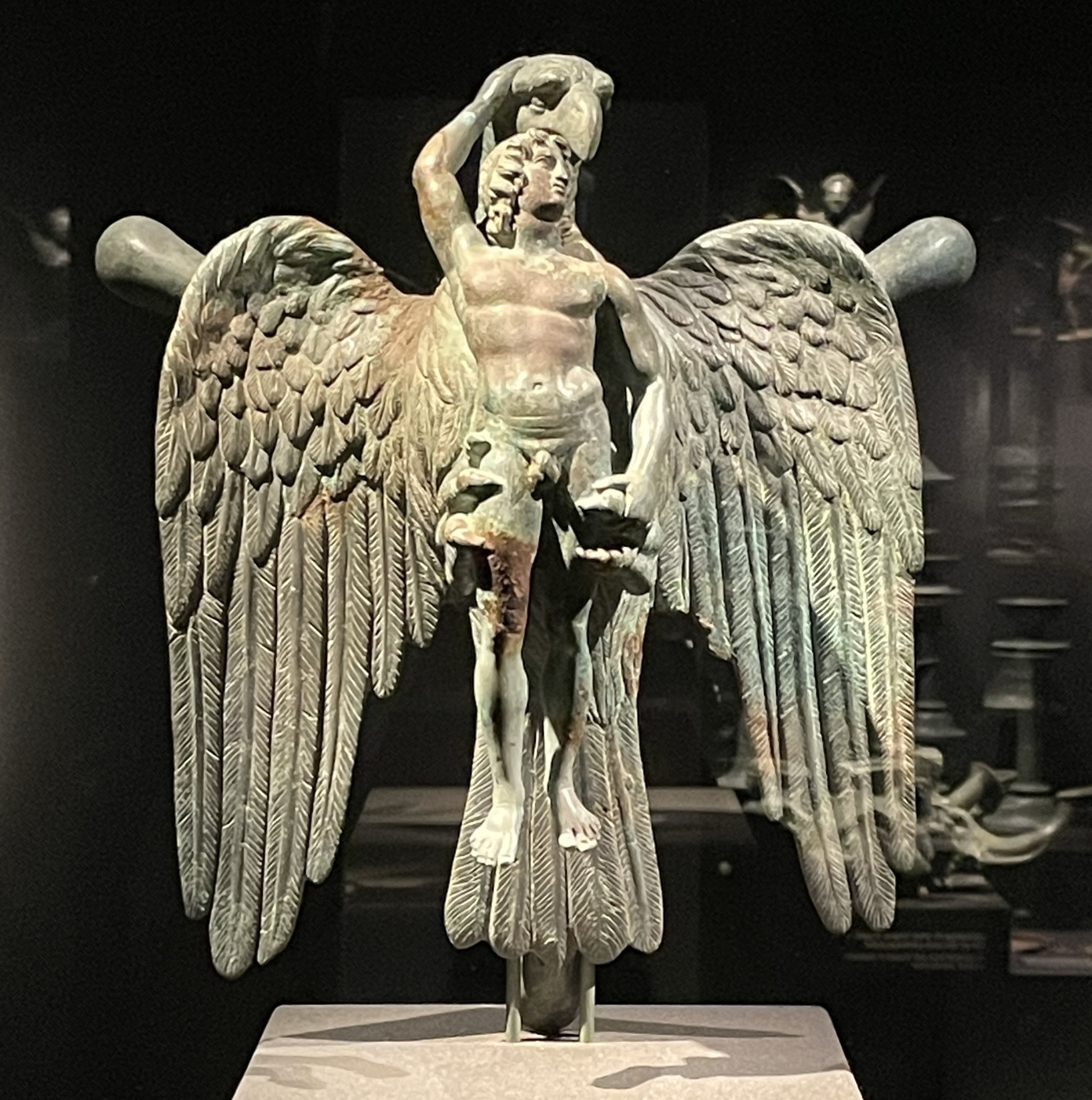
Bronze lamp featuring Zeus and Ganymede from western Georgia, c. 3rd century BC, Georgian National Museum

According to Levan Gordeziani, while the Greek Colchis etymologically descends from Urartian Qulḫa, the Greeks may have applied the name to a different region (and/or cultures) than the preceding Urartians had. Further confusion rests in possible differences in the Greeks' own usage of the name Colchis in political and mythological contexts (i.e. the relationship between "Aia-Colchis" and "the land of Colchis").

According to the scholar of Caucasian studies Cyril Toumanoff:

Colchis appears as the first Caucasian State to have achieved the coalescence of the newcomer. Colchis can be justly regarded as not a proto-Georgian, but a Georgian (West Georgian) kingdom. ... It would seem natural to seek the beginnings of Georgian social history in Colchis, the earliest Georgian formation.

According to most Classical-era sources, Colchis was bordered on the south-west by Pontus, on the west by the Black Sea, as far as the river Corax. To its north was the Greater Caucasus, beyond which was Sarmatia. On its east it bordered the Kingdom of Iberia and Montes Moschici (now the Lesser Caucasus). The south of Colchis bordered Armenia. The westward extent of the country is considered differently by different authors: Strabo makes Colchis begin at Trabzon, while Ptolemy, on the other hand, extends Pontus to the Rioni River.

Although some ancient authors consider Dioscurias to be the extreme northern settlement point of Colchians (in an ethnic sense), nevertheless "they consider it as a point located on the territory of non-Colchian tribes (Heniochi, Sanigs)". Since in a later era the name "Colchians" was organically connected with the name "Lazi", it should be remembered that Byzantine sources saw the northern limit of the spread of Laz people somewhere between the Phasis (modern. Poti) and Dioscurias".

The Greek name Kolchís (Κολχίς) is first used to describe a geographic area in the writings of Aeschylus and Pindar. Earlier writers speak of the "Kolchian" (Κολχίδα) people and their mythical king Aeëtes (Αἰήτης), as well as his eponymous city Aea or Aia (Αἶα), but don't make explicit references to a Kolchis nation or region. The main river was known as the Phasis (now Rioni) and was, according to some writers the southern boundary of Colchis, but more probably flowed through the middle of that country from the Caucasus west into the Euxine, and the Anticites or Atticitus (now Kuban). Arrian mentions many others by name, but they would seem to have been little more than mountain torrents: the most important of them were Charieis, Chobus or Cobus, Singames, Tarsuras, Hippus, Astelephus, Chrysorrhoas, several of which are also noticed by Ptolemy and Pliny. The chief towns were Dioscurias or Dioscuris (under the Romans called Sebastopolis, now Sukhumi) on the seaboard of the Euxine, Sarapana (now Shorapani), Phasis (now Poti), Pityus (now Pitsunda), Apsaros (now Gonio), Surium (now Vani), Archaeopolis (now Nokalakevi), Macheiresis, and Cyta or Cutatisium or Aia (now Kutaisi), the traditional birthplace of Medea. Scylax mentions also Mala or Male, which he, in contradiction to other writers, makes the birthplace of Medea.

== Physical-geographic characteristics ==
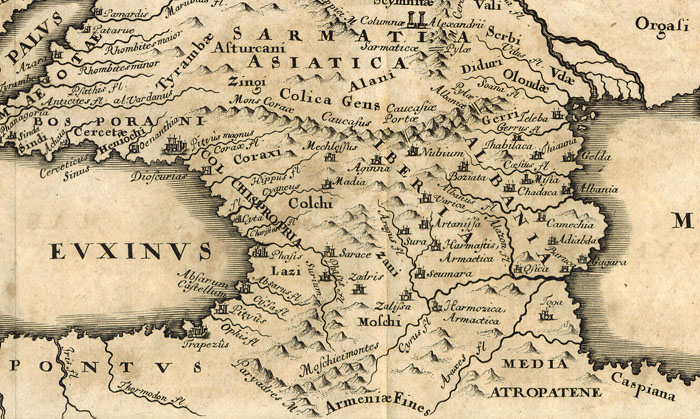
Map of Colchis and Iberia by Christoph Cellarius printed in Leipzig in 1706

In physical geography, Colchis is usually defined as the area east of the Black Sea coast, restricted from the north by the southwestern slopes of the Greater Caucasus, from the south by the northern slopes of the Lesser Caucasus in Georgia and Eastern Black Sea (Karadeniz) Mountains in Turkey, and from the east by Likhi Range, connecting the Greater and the Lesser Caucasus. The central part of the region is Colchis Plain, stretching between Sukhumi and Kobuleti; most of that lies on the elevation below 20 m (66 ft) above sea level. Marginal parts of the region are mountains of the Great and the Lesser Caucasus and Likhi Range.

Its territory mostly corresponds to what is now the western part of Georgia and encompasses the present-day Georgian provinces of Samegrelo, Imereti, Guria, Adjara, Abkhazia, Svaneti, Racha; the modern Turkey’s Rize, Trabzon and Artvin provinces (Lazistan, Tao-Klarjeti); and the modern Russia’s Sochi and Tuapse districts.

The climate is mild humid; near Batumi, annual rainfall level reaches 4,000 mm (160 in), which is the absolute maximum for continental western Eurasia. The dominating natural landscapes of Colchis are temperate rainforests, yet degraded in the plain part of the region; wetlands (along the coastal parts of Colchis Plain); subalpine and alpine meadows.

Colchis has a high proportion of Neogene and Palaeogene relict plants and animals, with the closest relatives in distant parts of the world: five species of Rhododendrons and other evergreen shrubs, wingnuts, Caucasian salamander, Caucasian parsley frog, eight endemic species of lizards from the genus Darevskia, the Caucasus adder (Vipera kaznakovi), Robert's snow vole, and endemic cave shrimp.

== Economy, agriculture and natural resources ==
Millet was the main staple crop in Colchis. Wheat grew in certain regions and was also imported by sea. Similarly, local wines were produced and some wines were brought from overseas. The Colchian plain provided ample grazing land for cattle and horses, with the name of Phasis associated with fine horses. The wetlands were a home for waterfowl, while Colchian pheasants were exported to Rome and became a symbol of excess condemned by Roman moralists. The Colchian hinterland lacked salt and demand was satisfied partially by local production on the coast and partially by imports from the northern coast of the Black Sea.

Colchis provided slaves as a tribute to the Achaemenid Empire and Colchian slaves are also attested in Ancient Greece.

== History ==
=== Prehistory and earliest references ===
Map of the Caucasus region around 290 BC

The eastern Black Sea region in antiquity was home to the well-developed Bronze Age culture known as the Colchian culture, related to the neighbouring Koban culture, that emerged toward the Middle Bronze Age. In at least some parts of Colchis, the process of urbanization seems to have been well advanced by the end of the second millennium BC. The Colchian Late Bronze Age (fifteenth to eighth century BC) saw the development of significant skill in the smelting and casting of metals. Sophisticated farming implements were made, and fertile, well-watered lowlands and a mild climate promoted the growth of progressive agricultural techniques.

The earliest attestations of the name of Colchis can be found in the 8th century Greek poet Eumelus of Corinth as Κολχίδα and earlier, in Urartian records as Qulḫa mentioned by the Urartian kings. The polity of Kilkhi/Qulha warred first against Assyrians under the rule of Tiglath-pileser I and then with Urartians under the reigns of Argišti I and Menua.. Historian Askold Ivanchik states: "Based on cuneiform texts and archeological data, Qulḫa must have existed as an independent flourishing state during the second half of the eighth century BCE, but hardly survived the end of the century". According to Svante Cornell, "What could be conceived as the proto Georgian statehood emerged mainly in the Western parts of today's Georgia, with the kingdom of Colchis (Kolkheti) in the sixth century BC."

Colchis was inhabited by a number of tribes whose settlements lay along the shore of the Black Sea. Chief among those were the Machelones, Heniochi, Zydretae, Lazi, Chalybes, Tibareni/Tubal, Mossynoeci, Macrones, Moschi, Marres, Apsilae, Abasgoi, Sanigae, Coraxi, Coli, Melanchlaeni, Geloni and Soani (Suani). The ancients assigned various origins to the tribes that inhabited Colchis.

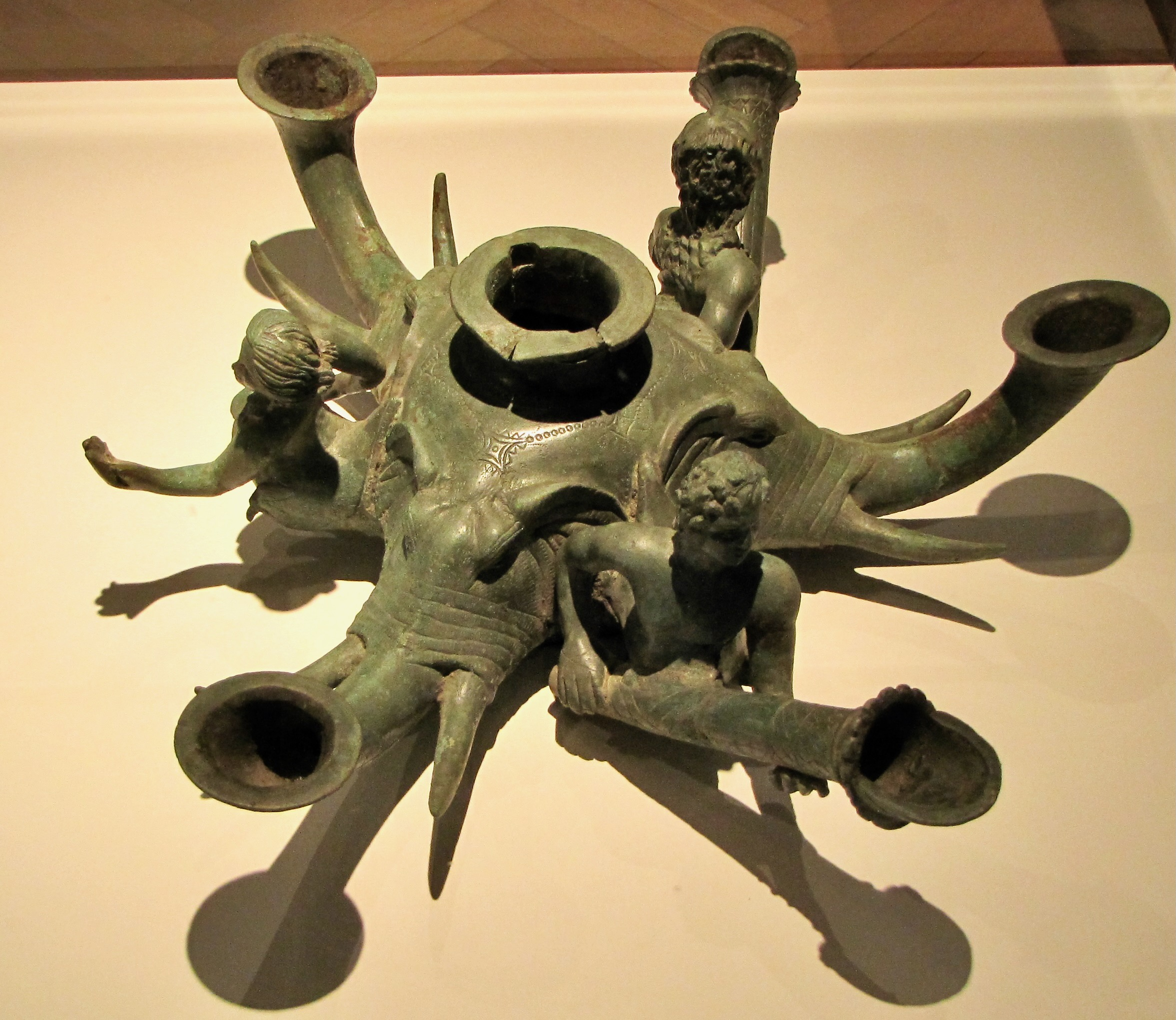
Bronze lamp featuring Heracles, Ariadne and elephants, 1st century BC, Georgian National Museum.

Herodotus, who is thought to have never been to Colchis, imagined Colchians as "dark-skinned (μελάγχροες) and woolly-haired" and calls them Egyptians. Furthermore, he claimed that the Colchians, with the Ancient Egyptians and the Ethiopians, were the first to practice circumcision, a custom that according to him was inherited by Colchians from remnants of the army of Pharaoh Sesostris (Senusret III). These claims have been widely rejected by modern historians. It is in doubt if Herodotus had ever been to Colchis or Egypt, and no Egyptian army ever set foot in the Caucasus, a region shielded by states to the south of the Caucasus too powerful for any Egyptian army to pass through, such as Urartu, Hittia, Assyria and Mitanni.

According to Pliny the Elder:

The Colchians were governed by their own kings in the earliest ages, that Sesostris king of Egypt was overcome in Scythia, and put to flight, by the king of Colchis, which if true, that the Colchians not only had kings in those times, but were a very powerful people.

Many modern theories suggest that the ancestors of the Laz-Mingrelians constituted the dominant ethnic and cultural presence in the region in antiquity, and hence played a significant role in the ethnogenesis of the modern Georgians.

Pausanias, a 1st-century BC Greek geographer, citing the poet Eumelos, assigned Aeëtes, the mythological first king of Colchis, a Greek origin.

=== Scytho-Cimmerian invasions ===
Starting from the 8th century BC, Colchis was invaded by Scythians and Cimmerians migrating from Central Asia into the Pontic steppes Scythians would go on to establish a base on the former territory of the kingdom, from where they performed raids and campaigns in Media and Anatolia.

=== Achaemenid satrapy ===
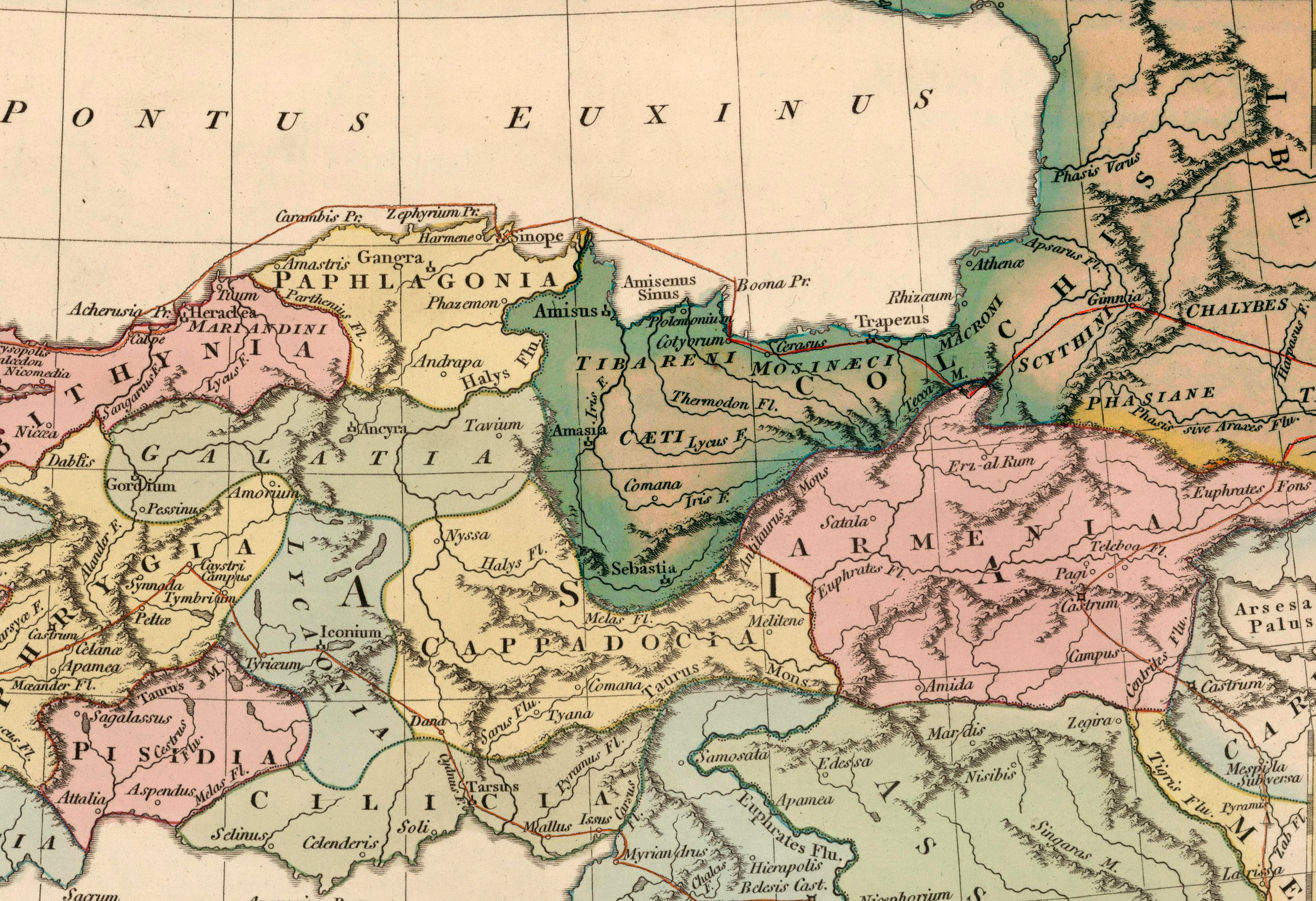
Southern Colchis. From "Reditus Decem Millium Graecorum", 1815

According to Donald Rayfield, the tribes living in the southern Colchis (Macrones, Moschi, and Marres) were incorporated into the Achaemenid Empire and formed the 19th satrapy, while the northern tribes submitted "voluntarily" and had to send to the Achaemenid court 100 girls and 100 boys every five years, though it is not clear whether these were Colchians or persons obtained from other peoples by war or purchase. In 400 BC, shortly after the Ten Thousand reached Trapezus, a battle was fought between them and Colchians, in which the latter were decisively defeated. The influence exerted on Colchis by the vast Achaemenid Empire with its thriving commerce and wide economic and commercial ties with other regions accelerated the socio-economic development of the Colchian land. Gocha R. Tsetskhladze further argues that although Colchis and neighboring Iberia were once viewed as not having been under Achaemenid rule, upon request they did pay tribute to the Achaemenid Empire as one would expect of entities under Achaemenid suzerainty.

Subsequently, the people of Colchis appear to have overthrown the Achaemenid authority, and to have formed an independent state. According to Ronald Suny this western Georgian state was federated to Kartli-Iberia in the east, and its kings ruled through skeptoukhi (royal governors) who received a staff from the king. According to David Braund's reading of Strabo's account, the native Colchian dynasty continued ruling the country in spite of its fragmentation into skeptoukhies.

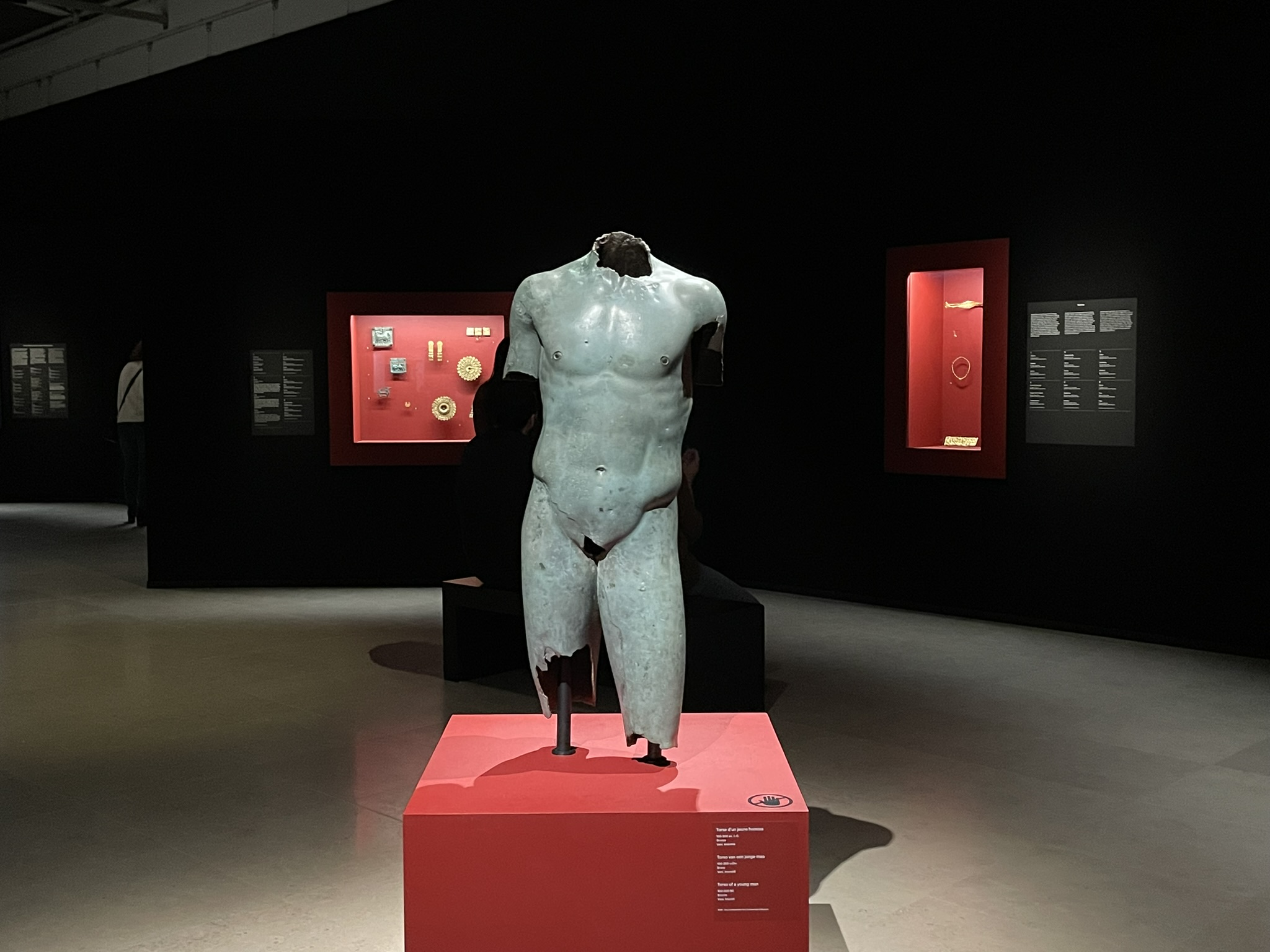
Second century BC Greek bronze torso from Colchis, held at the Georgian National Museum and temporarily exhibited at Cinquantenaire Museum

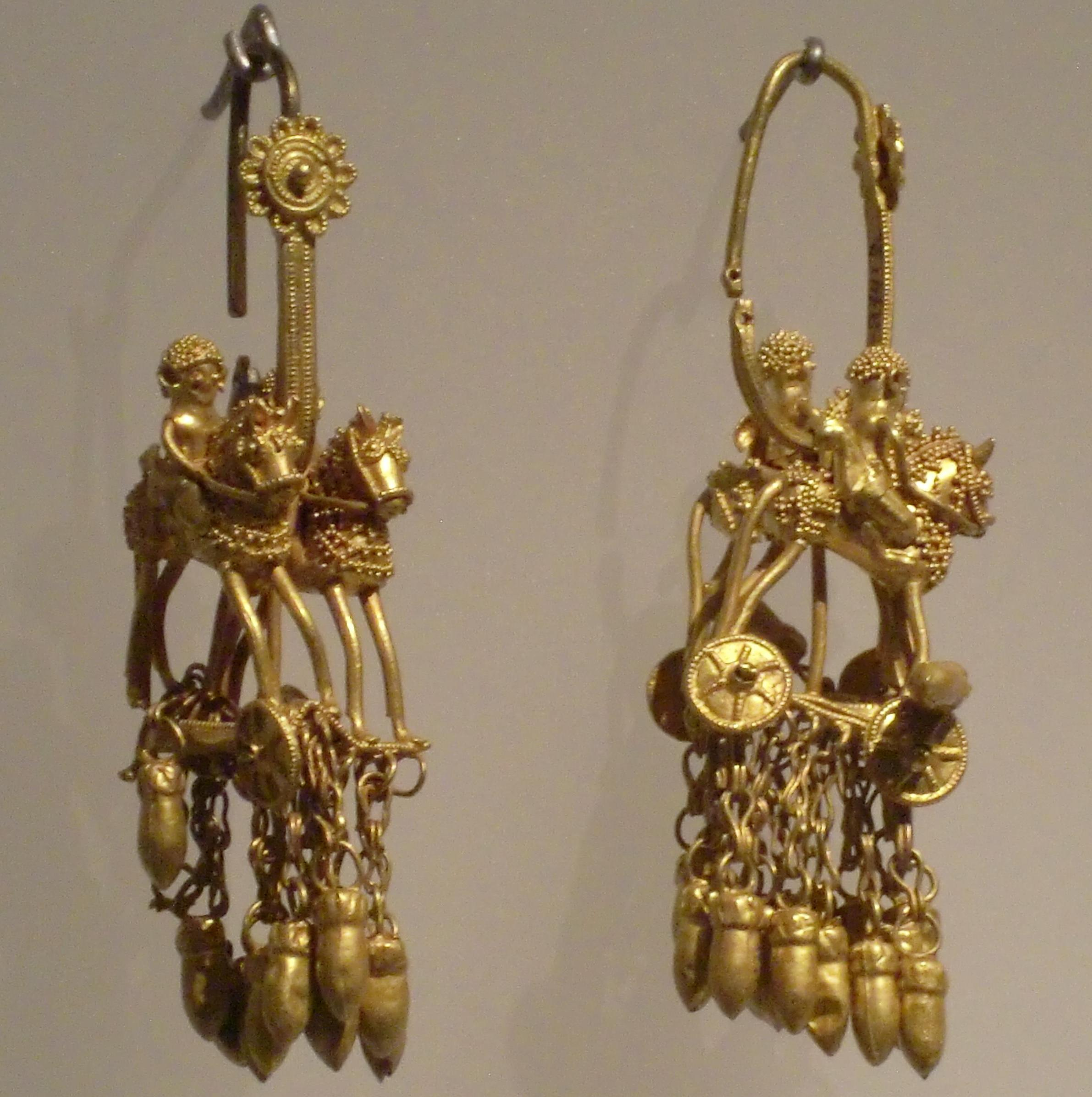
Colchian pendants, riders and horses on wheeled platforms, Georgian National Museum

=== Under Pontus ===
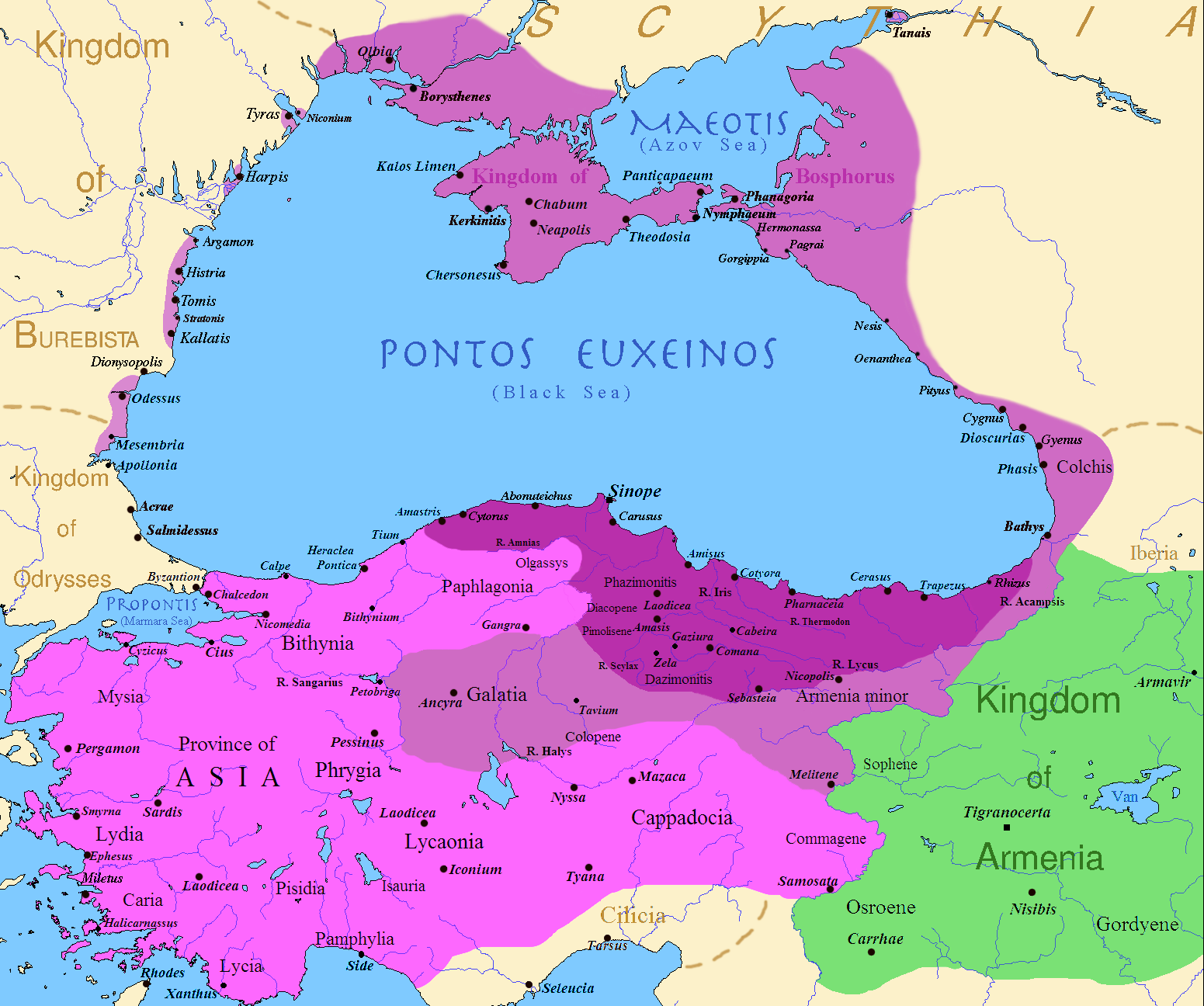
The expansion of the Kingdom of Pontus under Mithridates VI (c. 120–63 BC): (1) the kingdom before his reign (dark purple) (2) after his conquests (purple) (3) his conquests in the First Mithridatic War (89–85 BC) (pink)

Mithridates VI, king of Pontus, quelled an uprising in the region in 83 BC and gave Colchis to his son Mithridates, who, soon being suspected in having plotted against his father, was executed. During the Third Mithridatic War, Mithridates VI made another of his sons, Machares, king of Bosporus and Colchis, who held his power, but only for a short period. On the defeat of Mithridates VI of Pontus in 65 BC, Colchis was occupied by Pompey, who captured one of the local chiefs (sceptuchus) Olthaces, and installed Aristarchus as a dynast (63–47 BC). On the fall of Pompey, Pharnaces II, son of Mithridates, took advantage of Julius Caesar being occupied in Egypt, and reduced Colchis, Armenia, and some part of Cappadocia, defeating Gnaeus Domitius Calvinus, whom Caesar subsequently sent against him. His triumph was, however, short-lived. Under Polemon I, the son and heir of Zenon, Colchis was part of the Pontus and the Bosporan Kingdom. After the death of Polemon (8 BC), his second wife Pythodorida of Pontus retained possession of Colchis as well as of Pontus, although the kingdom of Bosporus was wrested from her power. Her son and successor, Polemon II of Pontus, was induced by Emperor Nero to abdicate the throne, and both Pontus and Colchis were incorporated in the Province of Galatia (63) and later, in Cappadocia (81). Phasis, Dioscurias and other Greek settlements of the coast did not fully recover after the wars of 60-40 BC and Trebizond became the economical and political centre of the region.

=== Under Roman rule ===
The remnants of the eastern gate in Archaeopolis

Despite the fact that all major fortresses along the sea coast were occupied by the Romans, their rule was relatively loose. In 69, the people of Pontus and Colchis under Anicetus staged a major uprising against the Roman Empire, which ended unsuccessfully. The lowlands and coastal area were frequently raided by fierce mountain tribes, with the Svaneti and Heniochi being the most powerful of them. Paying a nominal homage to Rome, they created their own kingdoms and enjoyed significant independence.

Under Hadrian, the Romans established relations with Colchian tribes. Hadrian sent his advisor, Arrian, to tour Colchis and Iberia. Arrian depicted a turbulent fluctuation of tribal powers and boundaries, with various hostile and anarchic tribes in the area. The Laz controlled most of coastal Colchis, while other tribes such as the Sanigs and Abasgoi escaped Roman jurisdiction. Other tribes, like the Apsilae, were becoming powerful and their king with the Romanised name Julianus was recognized by Trajan. Arrian listed the following peoples in his Periplus of the Euxine Sea written in 130-131 (from south to north): Sanni, Machelones, Heniochi, Zudreitae, Lazi, Apsilae, Abasgoi, Sanigs and Zilchi.

According to traditional accounts Christianity began to spread in the early first century by Andrew the Apostle, Simon the Zealot, and Saint Matthias. A change in burial patterns in the 3rd century was possibly due to Christian influence. The Hellenistic civilization, local paganism, and Mithraic Mysteries would, however, remain widespread until the fourth century. Goths, dwelling in the Crimea and looking for new homes, raided Colchis in 253, but were repulsed with the help of the Roman garrison of Pitsunda. By the first century BC, the Lazica (or the Laz) kingdom was established in the region. Lazica became known as Egrisi in 66 BC when Egrisi became a vassal of the Roman Empire after the Caucasian campaign of Pompey.

== Numismatics ==
Colchian coins, the oldest of which were dated to the middle of the 6th century BC, served as the primary source of evidence for the Colchian state. A reassessment of the coins, however, has revealed that these early "Colchian" coins actually represent the production of an Achaemenid satrapy.

== Rulers ==
Little is known of the rulers of Colchis.

Ruler	Reign	Notes
1. Akes (Basileus Aku)	end of the 4th c. BC	His name is found on a coin issued by him.
2. Kuji	325–280 BC	
3. Saulaces	2nd c. BC	
4.Akusilochus	c.180 BC	Participated in a treaty between Armenia and Pontus
5. Mithridates	fl. 80 BC	under the authority of Pontus.
6. Machares	fl. 65 BC	under the authority of Pontus.
7. Aristarchus	63–47 BC	appointed by Pompey

== In mythology ==
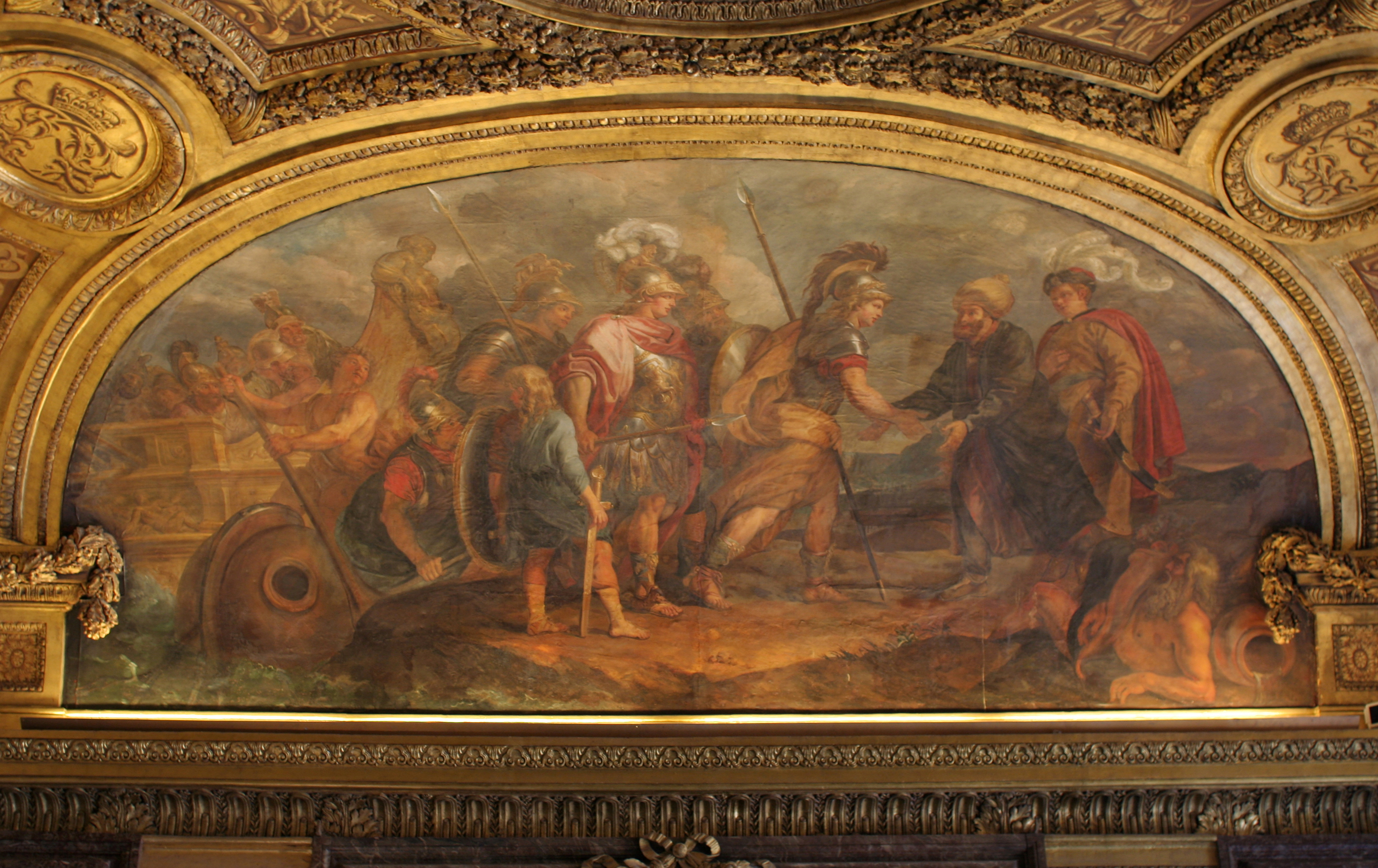
Jason and the Argonauts arriving at Colchis. The Argonautica tells the myth of their voyage to retrieve the Golden Fleece. This painting is located in the Palace of Versailles.

From the fifth century BC onwards, Colchis was identified as Aea, the mythical home of Aeëtes, Medea, the Golden Fleece, and the fire-breathing Colchis bulls and was the destination of the Argonauts.

Colchis also is thought to be a possible homeland of the Amazons. Amazons also were said to be of Scythian origin from Colchis.

According to the Greek mythology, Colchis was a fabulously wealthy land situated on the mysterious periphery of the heroic world. Here in the sacred grove of the war god Ares, King Aeëtes hung the Golden Fleece until it was seized by Jason and the Argonauts. Colchis was also the land where the mythological Prometheus was punished by being chained to a mountain while an eagle ate at his liver for revealing to humanity the secret of fire.

Apollonius of Rhodes named Aea as the main city (Argonautica, passim). The main mythical characters from Colchis are:

- Absyrtus, son of Aeëtes
- Aeëtes, King of Colchis, son of the sun-god Helios and the Oceanid Perseis (a daughter of Oceanus), brother of Circe and Pasiphae, and father of Medea, Chalciope, and Absyrtus
- Chalciope, daughter of King Aeëtes
- Circe, sister of King Aeëtes
- Idyia, Queen of Colchis, mother of Medea, Chalciope, and Absyrtus
- Medea, daughter of King Aeëtes
- Pasiphaë, sister of Aeëtes

== See also ==
- Pontus
- Roman Georgia
- Zygopolis

== Explanatory notes ==
1. or Kolchis; /ˈkɒlkɪs/; Ancient Greek: Κολχίς, Kolkhís, Ancient Greek pronunciation: [kolkʰís]
2. Colchis was not an established and structurally institutionalized monarchy.
3. Also known as Egri, Egr, Eguri and Egros in The Georgian Chronicles and Conversion of Kartli chronicles. In the Old Armenian geography Ashkharhatsuyts, it is referred to as Kołk῾is (Կողքիս) or Eger (Եգեր).

== General and cited sources ==
- Braund, David (1994). Georgia in Antiquity: A History of Colchis and Transcaucasian Iberia 550 BC–AD 562. Clarendon Press. ISBN 0-19-814473-3.
- Cunliffe, Barry (2019). The Scythians: Nomad Warriors of the Steppe. Oxford: Oxford University Press. ISBN 978-0-198-82012-3.
- Fehling, Detlev (1994). "The art of Herodotus and the margins of the world". In von Martels, Z.R.W.M. (ed.). Travel Fact and Travel Fiction: Studies on fiction, literary tradition, scholarly discovery, and observation in travel writing. Brill's Studies in Intellectual History Volume 55. Leiden, NL: Brill. pp. 1–15. ISBN 978-90-04-10112-8.
- Otar Lordkipanidze. Phasis: The River and City of Colchis. Geographica Historica 15. Franz Steiner, 2000. ISBN 3-515-07271-3.
- Marincola, John (2001). Greek Historians. Oxford, UK: Oxford University Press. ISBN 978-0-19-922501-9.
- Melamid, Alexander (January 1993). "Colchis Today". The Geographical Review. 83 (1): 79–83. Bibcode:1993GeoRv..83...79M. doi:10.2307/215382. JSTOR 215382.
- Mitchell, John Malcolm (1911). "Colchis" . Encyclopædia Britannica. Vol. 6 (11th ed.). pp. 662–663.
- Rayfield, Donald (2012). Edge of Empires : A History of Georgia. Reaktion Books.
- Thordarson, Fridrik (1993). "COLCHIS". Encyclopaedia Iranica, Vol. VI, Fasc. 1. pp. 41–42.
- Tsetskhladze, Gocha R. (1992). "The Cult of Mithras in Ancient Colchis". Revue de l'histoire des religions. 209 (2 (AVRIL - JUIN)): 115–124.
- Tsetskhladze, Gocha R. "Pichvnari and Its Environs, 6th c BC–4th c A". Annales Littéraires de l'Université de Franche-Comté, 659, Editeurs: M. Clavel-Lévêque, E. Geny, P. Lévêque. Paris: Presses Universitaires Franc-Comtoises, 1999. ISBN 2-913322-42-5
- Tsetskhladze, Gocha R. (2021). "The Northern Black Sea". In Jacobs, Bruno; Rollinger, Robert (eds.). A companion to the Achaemenid Persian Empire. John Wiley & Sons, Inc. p. 665. ISBN 978-1-119-17428-8.
- Tsetskhladze, Gocha R. (1993). "On the numismatics of Colchis: the classical archaeologist's perspective". Dialogues d'histoire ancienne. 19–1: 233–256 (235). doi:10.3406/dha.1993.2084. "A small percentage of the Colchian Type В hemidrachms are complete with Greek letters. [page 240] The Greek language was widespread in Colchis and decrees were even issued in that language."
- Tsetskhladze, Gocha R. (2022). "Classical Archeology of the Pontus in the Archaic Period: Some Current Problems and Prospective Solutions". In Colombi, Camilla; Parisi, Valeria; Dally, Ortwin; Guggisberg, Martin; Piras, Giorgio (eds.). Comparing Greek Colonies: Mobility and Settlement Consolidation from Southern Italy to the Black Sea (8th – 6th Century BC). Walter de Gruyter.
- Akaki Urushadze. The Country of the Enchantress Media, Tbilisi, 1984 (in Russian and English).
