= Berenice of Chios =

Greek noblewoman; third wife of Mithridates VI of Pontus

Berenice of Chios (Ancient Greek: Βερενίκη Bereníke; died about 72/71 BC) was an obscure Greek noblewoman from the Greek island of Chios who became the third wife of King Mithridates VI of Pontus.

== Biography ==
In 86 BC, Mithridates VI, through the agency of one of his generals, deported the inhabitants of Chios, the capital city of the Greek island of Chios. Then Mithridates distributed the land to Pontian settlers he brought in.

At some point, Mithridates VI met Berenice, who was a citizen from the capital of Chios. She became one of his mistresses and eventually his third wife. Little is known about their relationship. There is a possibility that Mithridates VI renamed the capital city of Chios in honor of Berenice. The city bore her name until the Romans annexed the island about 85 BC.

== Death ==
In about 72 or 71 BC, Plutarch reports that Mithridates VI ordered his family to commit suicide in order to avoid capture by the Roman consul Lucullus, who was pursuing him. Berenice decided to take her life with poison, but when her mother, who was next to her, requested some, she shared it with her. The shared amount eventually killed her mother, who was older, but did not take effect on her, and subsequently she was strangled by a man of the palace guard.
