= Cleopatra of Pontus =

Queen consort of Armenia of Pontic origin

- Queen Consort
- Reign: 94 BC-58 BC
- Born: 110 BC
- Died: after 58 BC
- Consort: Tigranes the Great
- Dynasty: Mithridatic
- Father: Mithridates VI Eupator
- Mother: Laodice
- Religion: Hellenistic Paganism

Cleopatra of Pontus (Ancient Greek: Κλεοπάτρα; 110 BC – after 58 BC) was a Pontian princess and a queen consort of Armenia.

She was one of the daughters of King Mithridates VI of Pontus and Queen Laodice. Cleopatra is sometimes known as Cleopatra the Elder, to distinguish her from her sister of the same name and was born and raised in the Kingdom of Pontus. She was the wife of the Armenian King Tigranes the Great.

She married Tigranes in 94 BC, cementing the alliance between Pontus and Armenia. She played a decisive role in the life of Tigranes and all of Armenia. Cleopatra bore Tigranes three sons: Zariadres, Tigranes and another unnamed one, and three daughters. One daughter married King Pacorus I of Parthia and the other married King Mithridates I of Media Atropatene.

Tigranes chose a foreign policy different from that of Mithridates towards the Roman Republic based on his interests, and he eventually signed a treaty with Rome following the Battle of Artaxata in 68 BC, as a result of which Cleopatra, under the influence of her father, instigated their sons to betray Tigranes. In 66 BC, Pompey captured the younger Tigranes and took him to Rome as a hostage. Tigranes later escaped in 58 BC with the assistance of Publius Clodius Pulcher. Roman historian Asconius described the event. The sons attempted unsuccessfully to seize the throne from Tigranes; Zariadres and his younger brother were executed by Tigranes.

Cleopatra escaped to her father and lived the remainder of her life in Pontus.

== Notes ==
1. Asconius, on Cicero's Pro Milone

== Bibliography ==
- Mayor, A. The Poison King: the life and legend of Mithradates, Rome’s deadliest enemy, Princeton University Press, 2009
- Khachʻatryan, Hayk (2001) Queens of the Armenians : 150 biographies based on history and legend, Sekhpossian, Nouné (transl.); Merguerian, Barbara J. (Ed.), Yerevan : "Amaras"; Boston, MA : Armenian International Women’s Association Press, ISBN 0-9648787-2-0
- Plutarch, Crassus 19; 22; 33.
