= Stratonice of Pontus =

Mistress and wife of Mithridates VI of Pontus

Stratonice of Pontus (Greek: Στρατoνίκη; fl. 1st century BC) was a Greek woman from the Kingdom of Pontus who was one of the mistresses and the fourth wife of King Mithridates VI of Pontus.

Stratonice was a citizen of the Pontian city of Kabeira. She was originally a woman of mean birth and was the daughter of a harpist.

Stratonice was a harpist in the court of Mithridates VI. She became one of the mistresses to the King and eventually Mithridates VI married her as one of his wives after 86 BC. Stratonice bore Mithridates a son called Xiphares. Stratonice became one of the favorite wives of the King and had obtained much influence over him. When Mithridates VI was compelled to undertake his perilous retreat to the Black Sea, Mithridates VI left Stratonice in charge of a strong fortress at Coenum in which he had deposited a large amount of treasure.

Stratonice was induced to hand over both the fortress and the fortress’ treasures to the Roman General Pompey, on the condition that Pompey would spare the life of her son. However Mithridates VI punished her for her treason by putting their son to death before her eyes. She died by 63 BC when the Kingdom of Pontus was annexed by the Roman General Pompey.

== Bibliography ==
- Mayor, A., The Poison King: the life and legend of Mithradates, Rome’s deadliest enemy, Princeton University Press, 2009, ISBN 978-0691150260
