= Adobogiona the Younger =

1st-century BC Pontic noblewoman

Adobogiona
- Born: c. 70 BC
- Died: c. 30 BC
- Spouse: Castor of Galatia
- Issue: Deiotarus Philadelphus
- Father: Mithridates VI of Pontus
- Mother: Adobogiona the Elder

Adobogiona (fl. c. 70 BC – c. 30 BC) was an illegitimate daughter of King Mithridates VI of Pontus. Her mother was the Galatian princess Adobogiona the Elder. After the death of her father, Adobogiona married the noble Castor Saecondarius, tetrach of all Galatians from 41/40 to 37/36 BC. Their son Deiotarus Philadelphus became the last king of Paphlagonia at some point before 31 BC and ruled until his death around AD 6.
