= Adobogiona the Elder =

Galatian princess from Anatolia

Adobogiona
- Born: c. 90 BC
- Died: c. 50 BC
- Spouse: Menodotus
- Issue: Mithridates I of the Bosporus
- Father: Deiotarus

Adobogiona (fl. c. 90 BC – c. 50 BC) was a Galatian princess from Anatolia. She was known as a mistress of Mithridates VI Eupator, and claimed he had fathered her children: a son, Mithridates of Pergamon, and a daughter, Adobogiona the Younger.

Adobogonia was a member of the Trokmian dynasty, rulers of Galatia; her brother was the Galatian king, Brogitaros. She was married to Menodotus, a wealthy citizen of Pergamon. A large statue of her was set up in temple of Hera in Pergamon.
