= The Grass Crown (novel) =

Book by Colleen McCullough

- First US edition
- Author: Colleen McCullough
- Language: English
- Genre: Historical Fiction
- Publisher: William Morrow (US); Century (UK)
- Publication date: 1991
- Publication place: Australia
- Media type: Print (Hardback & Paperback)
- Pages: 894
- ISBN: 0-688-09369-8
- Preceded by: The First Man in Rome
- Followed by: Fortune's Favourites

The Grass Crown is the second historical novel in Colleen McCullough's Masters of Rome series, published in 1991.

The novel opens shortly after the action of The First Man in Rome. Gaius Marius and Lucius Cornelius Sulla eat dinner together with their wives, and discuss the threat presented by Mithridates VI of Pontus and Tigranes II of Armenia.

== Plot summary ==
Although these two powerful Eastern rulers would eventually declare war on Rome and slaughter thousands of Roman citizens, the plot of the novel centres on the Social War of 91 to 88 BC, a civil war which Rome fought against its mutinous Italian Allies after they were refused full Roman citizenship. (The lengthy section dealing with Marcus Livius Drusus' attempt to secure them the citizenship, which ends in his tragic assassination, is one of the main turning points in the entire series.)

Marius and Sulla, still friends and professional colleagues, face the Italian threat together, and succeed in putting down the rebellion of the Italians. However, Marius suffers a serious stroke (his second), and is forced to withdraw from the war. During this struggle, Sulla, rallying his troops against certain destruction near Nola, is hailed as 'imperator' on the field of battle and presented with the highest honour a Roman general can receive: the corona graminea, the eponymous 'Grass Crown'. This was only awarded a very few times during the Republic, and only ever to a general or commander who broke the blockade around a beleaguered Roman army or otherwise saved an entire legion or army from annihilation.

However, once Rome has settled this pressing domestic matter, and can begin to plot revenge against Mithridates and Tigranes, Marius and Sulla have their first serious falling out over the question of who should lead the legions East. Marius, now an aged and discredited statesman previously dubbed the 'Third Founder of Rome', is pining for further glory and believes only he has the talent necessary to defeat the allied Kings. Sulla feels as though his old mentor is unwilling to step aside and wants to destroy Sulla's chance of outshining him. The Senate cites Marius's age and poor health as a reason to back Sulla, who moreover is the sitting consul and therefore has the side of right. The seeds of serious discord are planted.

The Roman comitia quickly becomes a source of political conflict between the two men, and leads to Sulla's first shocking march on Rome. It also leads Gaius Marius to pursue an unprecedented seventh consulship, which he wins and undertakes after suffering a series of strokes, and is depicted in this novel as going mad.

Other narrative threads of note: the childhood of Julius Caesar and Cato the Younger, as well as the early military careers of Pompey and Cicero (who was appointed to Pompeius Strabo as a cadet) in the Social War: and the unjust trial and exile of Publius Rutilius Rufus, falsely accused of extortion, driven out of Rome, and welcomed by a street festival in his honour in the city he was accused of looting.
