= Machares =

Pontic prince, governor of the Bosporian Kingdom

Machares (Greek: ο Μαχάρης; in Persian: warrior; died 65 BC) was a Pontic prince and son of King Mithridates VI of Pontus and Queen Laodice. He was made by his father ruler of the Bosporan Kingdom after Mithridates, for the second time, reduced that country, after the short war with the Roman Murena, in 80 BC.

In 73 BC, Mithridates, after his defeat by the Romans at Cyzicus, applied to Machares for succours, which were at the time readily furnished; but two years afterwards the repeated disasters of Mithridates proved too much for the fidelity of Machares, and he sent an embassy to the Roman general Lucullus with a present of a crown of gold, and requested to be admitted to terms of alliance with Rome. This was readily granted by Lucullus; and as a proof of his sincerity, Machares furnished the Roman general with supplies and assistance in the siege of Sinope. But when Mithridates, after his defeat by Pompey, adopted the daring resolution of marching with his army to the Bosporus, and renewing the contest from thence, Machares became alarmed for the consequences of his defection; and on learning the actual approach of his father, in 65 BC, fled to the city of Chersonesus, where he soon after, despairing of pardon, committed suicide. Cassius Dio, on the contrary, relates that Mithridates deceived him with promises of safety, and then put him to death.

== Sources ==
- Mayor, A. The Poison King: the life and legend of Mithradates, Rome’s deadliest enemy, Princeton University Press, 2009
