= Mithridates VI Eupator =

King of Pontus from 120 to 63 BC

Mithridates VI
- Basileus
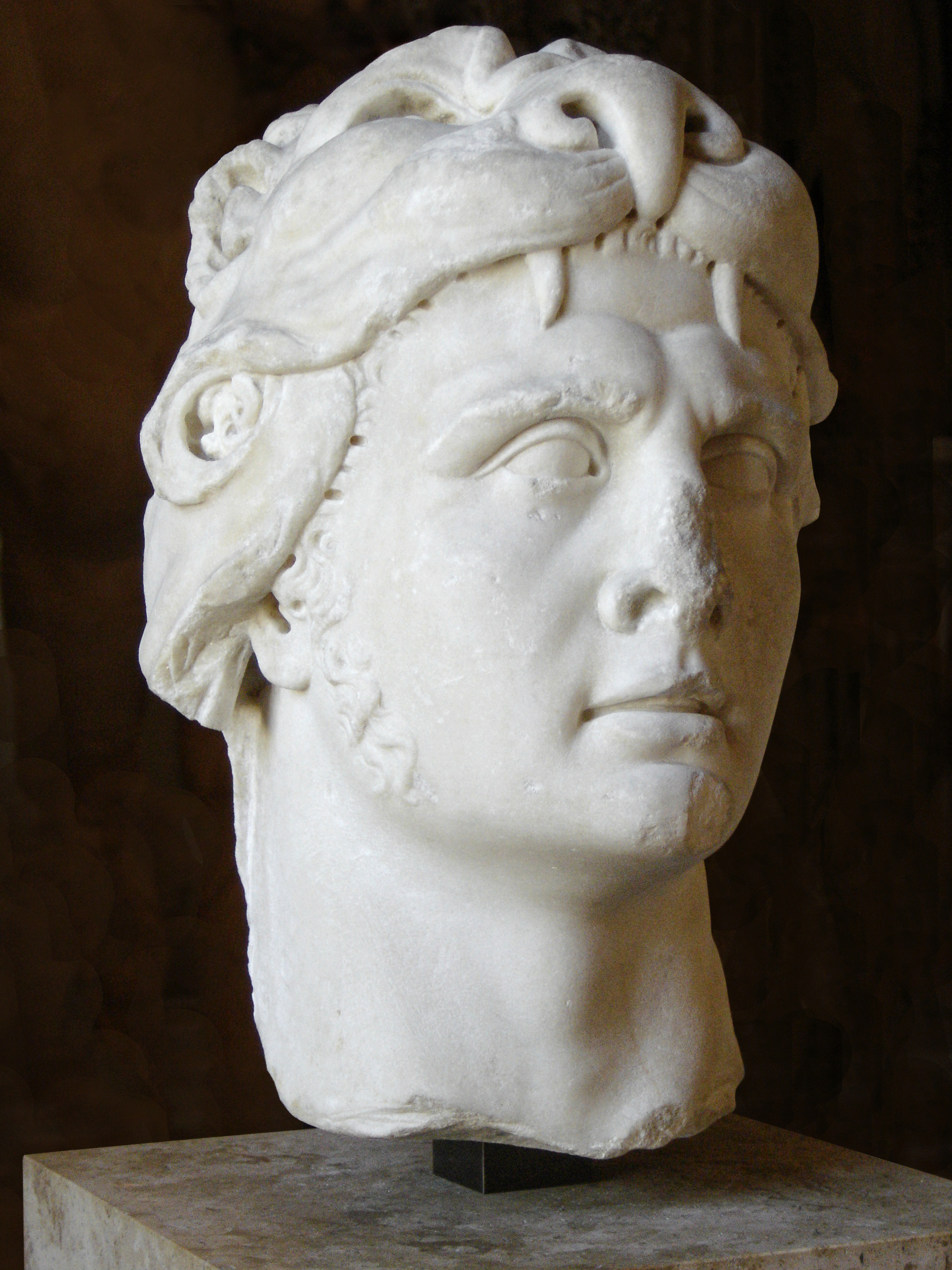
- Portrait of Mithridates as Heracles, Roman Imperial period

King of Pontus
- Reign: 120–63 BC
- Predecessor: Mithridates V Euergetes
- Successor: Pharnaces II of Pontus
- Born: 135 BC; Sinope, Kingdom of Pontus (modern-day Sinop, Turkey)
- Died: 63 BC (aged 71–72); Panticapaeum, Kingdom of Pontus (modern-day Kerch, Crimea)
- Burial: either Sinope or Amaseia, Kingdom of Pontus (modern-day Sinop or Amasya, Turkey)
- Spouse: Laodice; Monime; Berenice of Chios; Stratonice of Pontus; Unnamed fifth wife; Hypsicratea
- Issue Detail: Mithridates of Colchis; Arcathius; Machares; Pharnaces II of Pontus; Cleopatra of Pontus; Drypetina; Athenais; Xiphares; (illeg.) Mithridates I of the Bosporus; (illeg.) Adobogiona the Younger; (illeg.) Ariarathes IX of Cappadocia; (illeg.) Orsabaris
Names
- Mithradates Eupator Dionysus
- Dynasty: Mithridatic
- Father: Mithridates V Euergetes
- Mother: Laodice VI
- Religion: Hellenistic religion

Mithridates or Mithradates VI Eupator (Ancient Greek: Μιθριδάτης; 135–63 BC) sometimes known as Mithridates the Great was the Hellenistic ruler of the Kingdom of Pontus from 120 to 63 BC. He proved to be one of the Roman Republic's most formidable and determined opponents. He sought to dominate Anatolia and the Black Sea region, waging several hard-fought but ultimately unsuccessful wars to break Roman dominion over Asia and the Hellenic world.

Following the assassination of his father Mithridates V Euergetes, the teenage Mithridates ascended to the throne under the regency of his mother Laodice VI. In 113 BC he overthrew his mother and ruled alone thereafter. Aiming to elevate Pontus to the status of a major power, Mithridates subjugated Colchis and the Cimmerian Bosporus on the Black Sea, but his expansion westwards into Asia Minor made conflict with Rome inevitable. In 89 BC, spurred by his Roman allies, Nicomedes IV of Bithynia invaded Pontus. Mithridates defeated him and, taking advantage of Rome's preoccupation with the Social War, overran Roman Asia and orchestrated large-scale massacres of Romans and Italians in the region. Positioning himself as a champion of Hellenism, he brought much of mainland Greece (including Athens) to his side.

The Romans eventually responded when Lucius Cornelius Sulla, despite having been declared a public enemy, proceeded with his plan to defeat Mithridates. In the first of the Mithridatic Wars, Sulla achieved a string of victories over the Pontic forces, but factional struggle back in Rome forced him to offer a generous peace to Mithridates, restoring the situation to its pre-89 BC state. In 83 BC, the Roman legate Lucius Licinius Murena attacked Mithridates, provoking the Second Mithridatic War. Mithridates defeated him, and peace was again declared.

The Third Mithridatic War broke out in 73 BC when Nicomedes IV died without an heir and bequeathed Bithynia to Rome, prompting an invasion by Mithridates. He was routed by the legions of Lucullus and fled to his ally, Tigranes II of Armenia. In 67 BC, Mithridates retook Pontus after inflicting a major defeat on the Romans at Zela. His victory proved short-lived, and he was decisively defeated by Pompey at the Battle of the Lycus in 66 BC. Mithridates fled to Crimea, took over the Bosporan Kingdom and was preparing another war against Rome when his son Pharnaces rebelled against him. He retreated to Panticapaeum, where he committed suicide.

== Biography ==
=== Name and ancestry ===
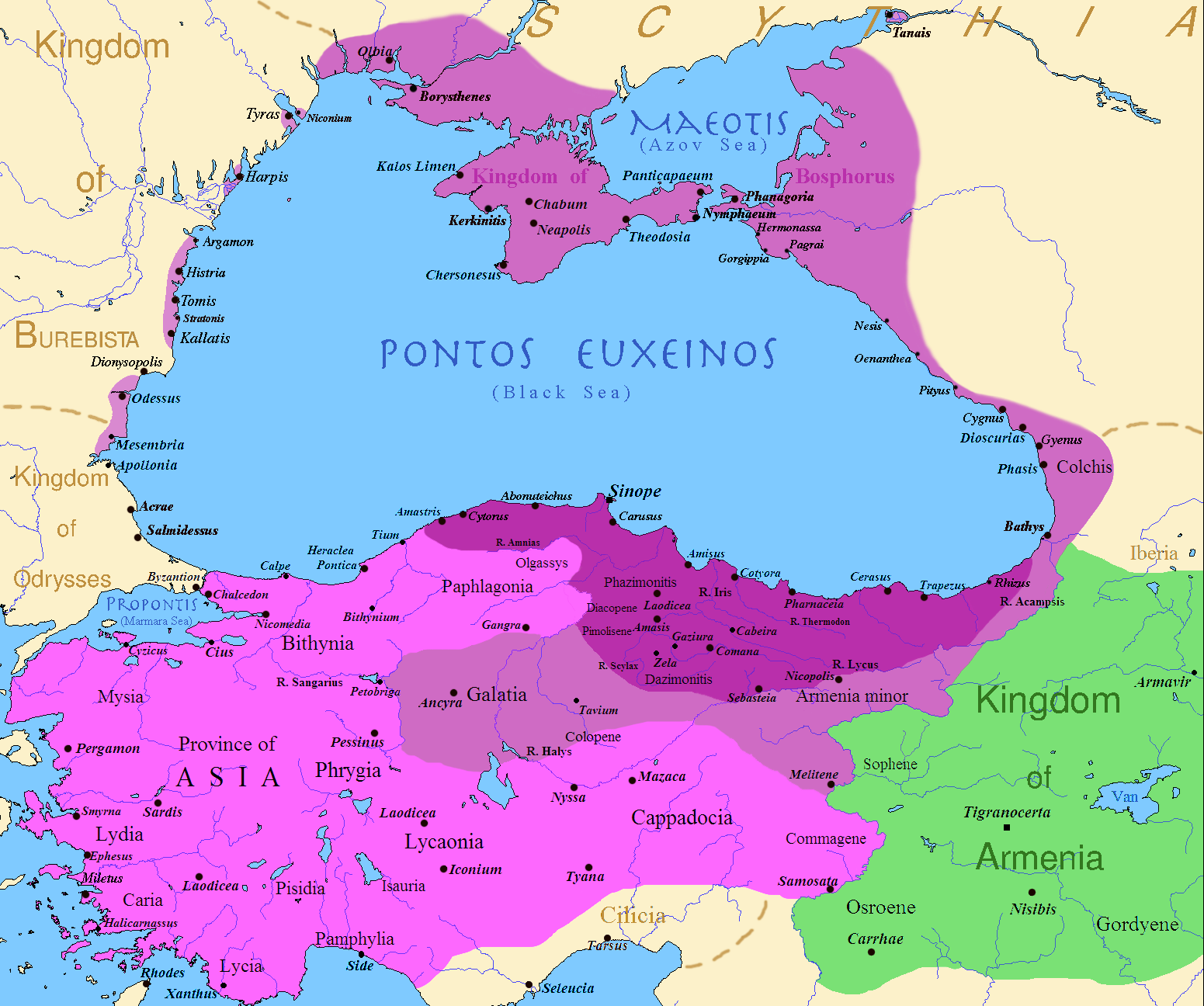
Map of the Kingdom of Pontus Before the reign of Mithridates VI After his early conquests After his conquests in the First Mithridatic War Including Pontus' ally the Kingdom of Armenia

Mithridates is the Greek attestation of the Iranian name Mihrdāt, meaning "given by Mithra" (Persian: مهرداد - Mehrdād), the name of the ancient Iranian sun god. The name Mihrdāt itself derives from Old Iranian Miθra-dāta-. The Greek-language epithet "eupator" (Ancient Greek: Εὐπάτωρ) means "of a well (noble) father", and was adopted by a number of other Hellenistic rulers.

Mithridates was a prince of mixed Iranian and Greek ancestry. He claimed descent from Cyrus the Great and the family of Darius the Great from his father’s side who was Persian and from his mother’s side the Regent Antipater and Alexander's generals Antigonus I Monophthalmus and Seleucus I Nicator.

=== Early life ===
Mithridates was born in the Pontic city of Sinope, on the Black Sea coast of Anatolia, and was raised in the Kingdom of Pontus. He was the first son among the children born to Laodice VI and Mithridates V Euergetes (reigned 150–120 BC). His father, Mithridates V, was a prince and the son of the former Pontic monarchs Pharnaces I of Pontus and his cousin-wife Nysa. His mother, Laodice VI, was a Seleucid princess and the daughter of the Seleucid monarchs Antiochus IV Epiphanes and his sister-wife Laodice IV.

Mithridates V was assassinated in about 120 BC in Sinope, poisoned by unknown persons at a lavish banquet which he held. He left the kingdom to the joint rule of his widow Laodice VI, and their elder son Mithridates VI, and younger son Mithridates Chrestus. Neither Mithridates VI nor his younger brother were of age, and their mother retained all power as regent for the time being. Laodice VI's regency over Pontus was from 120 BC to 116 BC (even perhaps up to 113 BC) and favoured Mithridates Chrestus over Mithridates. During his mother's regency, Mithridates escaped from his mother's plots against him and went into hiding.

Mithridates emerged from hiding and returned to Pontus between 116 and 113 BC. There, he was hailed as king. By this time he had grown to become a man of considerable stature and physical strength. He combined extraordinary energy and determination with a considerable talent for politics, organization and strategy. Mithridates removed his mother and brother from the throne, imprisoning them both. In this way, he became the sole ruler of Pontus. Laodice VI died in prison, ostensibly of natural causes. Mithridates Chrestus may have died in prison also or may have been tried for treason and executed. Mithridates gave both of them royal funerals. Mithridates took his younger sister Laodice, aged 16, as his first wife. His goals in doing so were to preserve the purity of their bloodline, to solidify his claim to the throne, to co-rule over Pontus, and to ensure the succession to his legitimate children.

=== Early reign ===
Mithridates entertained ambitions of making his state the dominant power on the Black Sea and in Anatolia. He first subjugated Colchis, a region east of the Black Sea occupied by present-day Georgia, and prior to 164 BC, an independent kingdom. He then clashed for supremacy on the Pontic steppe with the Scythian king Palacus. The most important centres of Crimea, Tauric Chersonesus and the Bosporan Kingdom readily surrendered their independence in return for Mithridates' promises to protect them against the Scythians, their ancient enemies. After several abortive attempts to invade the Crimea, the Scythians and the allied Rhoxolanoi suffered heavy losses at the hands of the Pontic generals Neoptolemus and Diophantus and accepted Mithridates as their overlord.

The young king then turned his attention to Anatolia, where Roman power was on the rise. He contrived to partition Paphlagonia and Galatia with King Nicomedes III of Bithynia. It was probably on the occasion of the Paphlagonian invasion of 108 BC that Mithridates adopted the Bithynian era for use on his coins in honour of the alliance. This calendar era began with the first Bithynian king Zipoites I in 297 BC. It was certainly in use in Pontus by 96 BC at the latest.

Yet it soon became clear to Mithridates that Nicomedes was steering his country into an anti-Pontic alliance with the expanding Roman Republic. When Mithridates fell out with Nicomedes over control of Cappadocia, and defeated him in a series of battles, the latter was constrained to openly enlist the assistance of Rome. The Romans twice interfered in the conflict on behalf of Nicomedes (95–92 BC), leaving Mithridates, should he wish to continue the expansion of his kingdom, with little choice other than to engage in a future Roman-Pontic war. By this time Mithridates had resolved to expel the Romans from Asia.

=== Mithridatic Wars ===
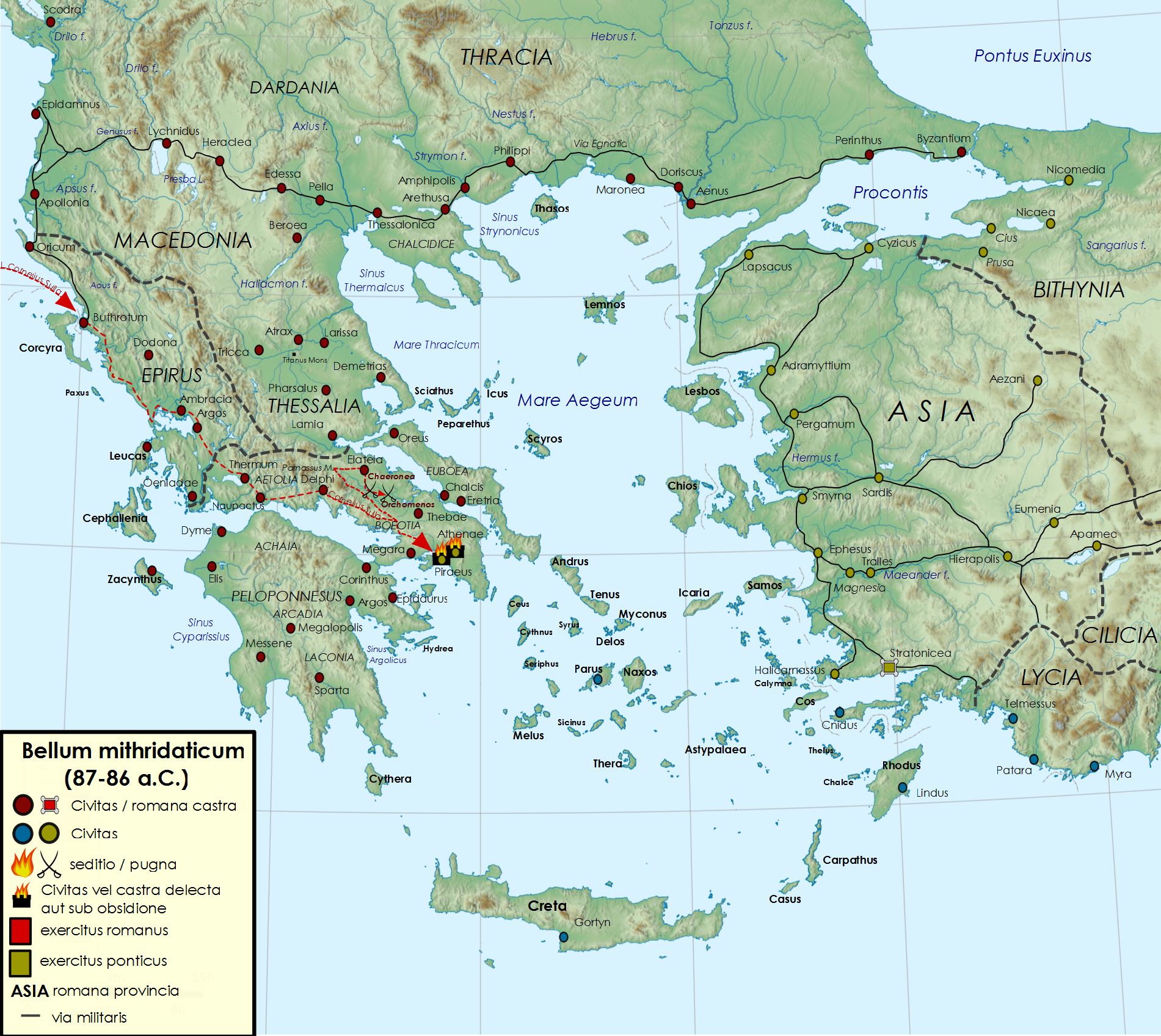
First Mithridatic War, 87–86 BC

The next ruler of Bithynia, Nicomedes IV of Bithynia, was a figurehead manipulated by the Romans. Mithridates plotted to overthrow him, but his attempts failed and Nicomedes IV, instigated by his Roman advisors, declared war on Pontus. Rome itself was at the time involved in the Social War, a civil war with its Italian allies; as a result, there were only two legions present in all of Roman Asia, both in Macedonia. These legions combined with Nicomedes IV's army to invade Mithridates' Kingdom of Pontus in 89 BC. Mithridates won a decisive victory, scattering the Roman-led forces. His victorious forces were welcomed throughout Anatolia. The following year, 88 BC, Mithridates ordered a massacre of Roman and Italian settlers remaining in several major Anatolian cities, including Pergamon and Tralles, essentially wiping out the Roman presence in the region. As many as 80,000 people are said to have perished in the killings. The episode is known as the Asiatic Vespers.

The Kingdom of Pontus comprised a mixed population in its Ionian Greek and Anatolian cities. The royal family moved the capital from Amasia to the Greek city of Sinope. Its rulers tried to fully assimilate the potential of their subjects by showing a Greek face to the Greek world and an Iranian/Anatolian face to the Eastern world. Whenever the gap between the rulers and their Anatolian subjects became greater, they would put emphasis on their Persian origins. In this manner, the royal propaganda claimed heritage both from Persian and Greek rulers, including Cyrus the Great, Darius I of Persia, Alexander the Great, and Seleucus I Nicator. Mithridates too posed as a champion of Hellenism, but this was mainly to further his political ambitions; it is no proof that he felt a mission to promote its extension within his domains. Whatever his true intentions, the Greek cities (including Athens) defected to the side of Mithridates and welcomed his armies in mainland Greece, while his fleet besieged the Romans at Rhodes. His neighbour to the southeast, the King of Armenia Tigranes the Great, established an alliance with Mithridates and married one of Mithridates' daughters, Cleopatra of Pontus. The two rulers would continue to support each other in the coming conflict with Rome.

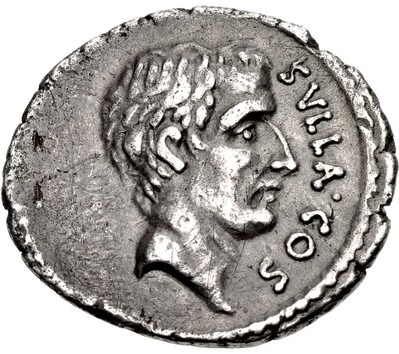
Roman coin of 54 BC, depicting Sulla

The Romans responded to the massacre of 88 BC by organising a large invasion force to defeat Mithridates and remove him from power. The First Mithridatic War, fought between 88 and 84 BC, saw Lucius Cornelius Sulla force Mithridates out of Greece proper. After achieving victory in several battles, Sulla received news of trouble back in Rome posed by his rival Gaius Marius and hurriedly concluded peace talks with Mithridates. As Sulla returned to Italy, Lucius Licinius Murena was left in charge of Roman forces in Anatolia. The lenient peace treaty, which was never ratified by the Senate, allowed Mithridates VI to restore his forces. Murena attacked Mithridates in 83 BC, provoking the Second Mithridatic War from 83 to 81 BC. Mithridates defeated Murena's two green legions at the Battle of Halys in 82 BC before peace was again declared by treaty.

When Rome attempted to annex Bithynia (bequeathed to Rome by its last king) nearly a decade later, Mithridates attacked with an even larger army, leading to the Third Mithridatic War from 73 BC to 63 BC. Lucullus was sent against Mithridates and the Romans routed the Pontic forces at the Battle of Cabira in 72 BC, driving Mithridates into exile in Tigranes' Armenia. While Lucullus was preoccupied fighting the Armenians, Mithridates surged back to retake Pontus by crushing four Roman legions under Valerius Triarius and killing 7,000 Roman soldiers at the Battle of Zela in 67 BC. He was routed by Pompey's legions at the Battle of the Lycus in 66 BC.

After this defeat, Mithridates fled with a small army to Colchis and then over the Caucasus Mountains to Crimea and made plans to raise yet another army to take on the Romans. His eldest living son, Machares, viceroy of Cimmerian Bosporus, was unwilling to aid his father. Mithridates had Machares killed, and Mithridates took the throne of the Bosporan Kingdom. He then ordered conscription and preparations for war. In 63 BC, another of his sons, Pharnaces II of Pontus, led a rebellion against his father, joined by Roman exiles in the core of Mithridates' Pontic army. Mithridates withdrew to the citadel in Panticapaeum, where he committed suicide. Pompey buried Mithridates in the rock-cut tombs of his ancestors in Sinope, the new capital of Pontus.

=== Death ===
After Pompey defeated him in Pontus, Mithridates VI fled to the lands north of the Black Sea in the winter of 66 BC in the hope that he could raise a new army and carry on the war through invading Italy by way of the Danube. His preparations proved to be too harsh on the local nobles and populace, and they rebelled against his rule. He reportedly attempted suicide by poison, which failed because of his immunity to the substance. According to Appian's Roman History, he then requested his Gallic bodyguard and friend, Bituitus, to kill him by the sword:

Mithridates then took out some poison that he always carried next to his sword, and mixed it. There two of his daughters, who were still girls growing up together, named Mithridates and Nysa, who had been betrothed to the kings of [Ptolemaic] Egypt and of Cyprus, asked him to let them have some of the poison first, and insisted strenuously and prevented him from drinking it until they had taken some and swallowed it. The drug took effect on them at once; but upon Mithridates, although he walked around rapidly to hasten its action, it had no effect, because he had accustomed himself to other drugs by continually trying them as a means of protection against poisoners. These are still called the Mithridatic drugs. Seeing a certain Bituitus there, an officer of the Gauls, he said to him, "I have profited much from your right arm against my enemies. I shall profit from it most of all if you will kill me, and save from the danger of being led in a Roman triumph one who has been an autocrat so many years, and the ruler of so great a kingdom, but who is now unable to die by poison because, like a fool, he has fortified himself against the poison of others. Although I have kept watch and ward against all the poisons that one takes with his food, I have not provided against that domestic poison, always the most dangerous to kings, the treachery of army, children, and friends." Bituitus, thus appealed to, rendered the king the service that he desired.

Cassius Dio's Roman History records a different account:

Mithridates had tried to make away with himself, and after first removing his wives and remaining children by poison, he had swallowed all that was left; yet neither by that means nor by the sword was he able to perish by his own hands. For the poison, although deadly, did not prevail over him, since he had inured his constitution to it, taking precautionary antidotes in large doses every day; and the force of the sword blow was lessened on account of the weakness of his hand, caused by his age and present misfortunes, and as a result of taking the poison, whatever it was. When, therefore, he failed to take his life through his own efforts and seemed to linger beyond the proper time, those whom he had sent against his son fell upon him and hastened his end with their swords and spears. Thus Mithridates, who had experienced the most varied and remarkable fortune, had not even an ordinary end to his life. For he desired to die, albeit unwillingly, and though eager to kill himself was unable to do so; but partly by poison and partly by the sword he was at once self-slain and murdered by his foes.

At the behest of Pompey, Mithridates' body was later buried alongside his ancestors (in either Sinope or Amaseia). Mount Mithridat in the central Kerch and the town of Yevpatoria in Crimea commemorate his name.

== Rulership ==
Where his ancestors pursued philhellenism as a means of attaining respectability and prestige among the Hellenistic kingdoms, Mithridates VI made use of Hellenism as a political tool. Greeks, Romans and Asians were welcome at his court. As protector of Greek cities on the Black Sea and in Asia against barbarism, Mithridates VI logically became the protector of Greece and Greek culture, and used this stance in his clashes with Rome. Strabo mentions that Chersonesus buckled under the pressure of the barbarians and asked Mithridates VI to become its protector (7.4.3. c.308). The most impressive symbol of Mithridates VI's approbation with Greece (Athens in particular) appears at Delos: a heroon dedicated to the Pontic king in 102/1 BC by the Athenian Helianax, a priest of Poseidon Aisios. A dedication at Delos, by Dicaeus, a priest of Sarapis, was made in 94/93 BC on behalf of the Athenians, Romans, and "King Mithridates Eupator Dionysus". Greek styles mixed with Persian elements also abound on the official Pontic coins – Perseus was favoured as an intermediary between both worlds, East and West.

Certainly influenced by Alexander the Great, Mithridates VI extended his influence from defender of Greece to the great liberator of the Greek world as war with the Roman Republic became inevitable. The Romans were easily translated into barbarians, in the same sense as the Persian Empire during the war with Persia in the first half of the 5th century BC and during Alexander's campaign. Mithridates VI was able to fight the First War with Rome on Greek soil, and maintain the allegiance of Greece. His campaign for the allegiance of the Greeks was aided in no small part by his enemy Sulla, who allowed his troops to sack the city of Delphi and plunder many of the city's most famous treasures to help finance his military expenses. Under his rule the Kingdom of Pontus became the intellectual and cultural capital of the Ancient world. He could be merciful and kind, yet ruthless and cruel, he was a very complex man overall.

== Personal life ==
=== Immunity to poison ===
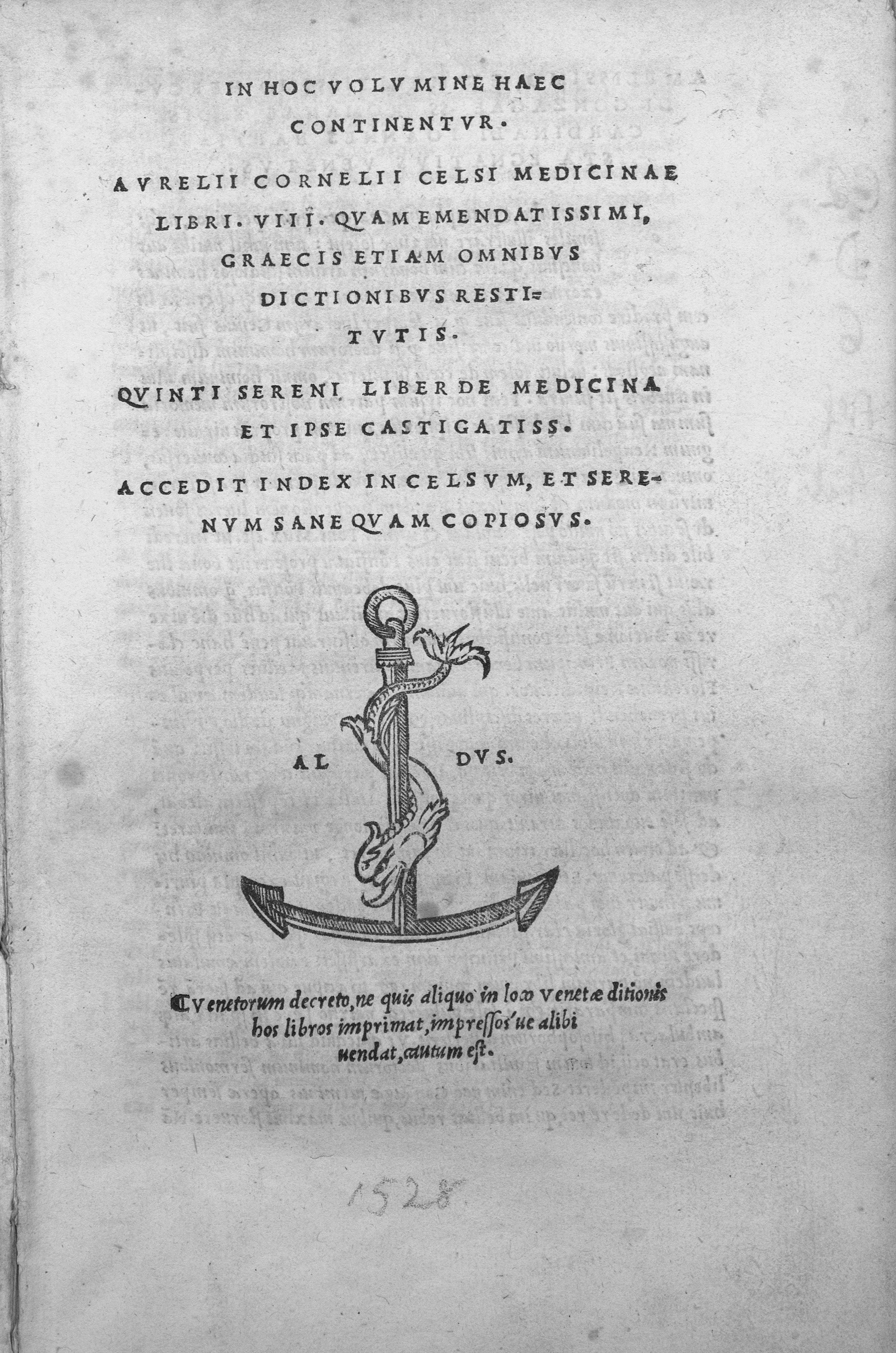
De Medicina

In his youth, after the assassination of his father Mithridates V in 120 BC, Mithridates is said to have lived in the wilderness for seven years, inuring himself to hardship. While there and after his accession, he cultivated an immunity to poisons by regularly ingesting sub-lethal doses of poisons, particularly the arsenic that killed his father Mithridates V. This form of hormesis is effective against some but not all toxins and subsequently became known as Mithridatism or Mithridatization. After he became king of Pontus, Mithridates continued to study poisons and develop antidotes, whose initial efficacies were tested on Pontic criminals condemned to death. Attalus III of Pergamon (d. 133 BC) is also known to have studied poisons and antidotes in this way. In keeping with most medical practices of his era, Mithridates' antitoxin routines included a religious component; they were supervised by the Agari, a group of Scythian shamans who never left him. (He was also reportedly guarded in his sleep by a horse, a bull, and a stag, which would whinny, bellow, and bleat whenever anyone approached the royal bed.) The Greek doctor Crateuas the Rootcutter may have worked directly under Mithridates or may have only been in correspondence with him. Mithridates was also said to have received samples including megalium and kyphi from Zopyrus of Alexandria and treatises from Asclepiades in lieu of a requested visit. By the time of his death in 63 BC, Mithridates was reported to have developed a complex "universal antidote" against poisoning, which he took every day with cold spring water and which became known as mithridate or mithridatium. He was said to consume it daily. The original formula has been entirely lost, although Pliny reports that Mithridates' various antidotes usually included the blood of Pontic ducks (possibly ruddy shelducks), which fed on poisonous plants like hellebore and hemlock and thus provided a kind of serum against them. Elsewhere, Pliny reports that surviving notes of Mithridates' work did not include exotic ingredients and that Pompey found an antidote recipe among Mithridates' notes that consisted of 2 dried walnuts, 2 figs, and 20 rue leaves, which were supposed to be crushed together and taken with a pinch of salt by a person who had fasted for at least one day.

The legions under Pompey who had defeated Mithridates killed his secretary Callistratus and burnt some of his papers, but were also reported to have taken an extensive medicinal library and collection of specimens back to Rome, where Pompey's slave Lenaeus translated them into Latin and the Roman doctors like A. Cornelius Celsus began prescribing various recipes under the name of Mithridates' antidote (Latin: antidotum Mithridaticum). Numerous recipes survive from the 1st century, all consisting of a polypharmiceutical electuary including castor from willow-consuming beavers and opium sweetened with honey—Pontic honey tending to contain mild amounts of poison from local plants like rhododendron and oleander—but otherwise all differing in both ingredients and amounts. It seems likely Pompey and Lenaeus kept Mithridates' personal recipe secret, leading to various attempts to recreate it after their deaths. A foreign father and son both named Paccius seem to have become rich selling their own secret recipe under Tiberius. Around the same time, Celsus advocated taking an almond-sized amount of his ginger-heavy preparation daily with wine. Andromachus the Elder, Nero's court physician, developed theriac (theriaca Andromachi) by supplementing the versions of Mithridates' formula known in his day with more opium, poppy seeds, and a homeopathic addition of viper flesh. One of the vats uncovered at Pompeii seems to have been used to create this version of Mithridates' antidote. Galen added still more opium and a skink in his version of the recipe. Of the plants shared across these early forms of mithridate, many seem to be strongly odoriferous or to exhibit antibacterial and anti-inflammatory abilities; it is also noteworthy that bioactive alkaloids and poisons are not widely represented.

Mithridate and theriac continued to be staples of Western and Islamic medicine into the 19th century, consumed by Caesar and emperors, kings, and queens including Marcus Aurelius, Septimius Severus, Alfred the Great, Charlemagne, Henry VIII, and Queen Elizabeth. Some medieval preparations had as many as 184 ingredients. Owing to the idea that disease could be caused by "internal poisons", the antidotes also came to be thought of as panaceas able to cure damage from falls, some illnesses, or even all illnesses. When it failed, the problem was believed to be improper preparation or storage, leading some jurisdictions to legally require its preparation in full view of the public in city squares. Concerns about mithridate's purity and later inefficacy were closely involved with the development of medical and pharmaceutical regulation. Mithridate remains available from some doctors, particularly in the Middle East. As early as Pliny, however, some considered it quackery and its various components and proportions pseudoscientific. Chinese doctors received samples of mithridate from Muslim ambassadors in the Tang dynasty but never popularized or advocated it. The Islamic scientist Averroes, meanwhile, believed it may be helpful in some cases but cautioned against regular consumption by the healthy as it "could actually transform human nature into a kind of poison". It notably failed as a cure to plague and epilepsy, and William Heberden's 1745 Antitheriaca (Ancient Greek: Αντιθηριακα, Antithēriaka) helped fully discredit it in England. By the 19th century, it was only being prescribed for dyspepsia or described as of historical interest only.

=== Polyglot ===
In Pliny the Elder's account of famous polyglots, it is said that Mithridates could speak the languages of all the twenty-two nations he governed. This reputation led to the use of Mithridates' name as title in some later works on comparative linguistics, such as Conrad Gessner's Mithridates de differentiis linguarum (1555), and Adelung and Vater's Mithridates oder allgemeine Sprachenkunde (1806–1817).

=== Family ===
Mithridates VI had a number of wives and mistresses, by whom he had several children. The names he gave his children are a representation of his Iranic and Greek heritage and ancestry.

His first wife was his sister Laodice. They were married from 115/113 BC until about 90 BC. They had several children. Their sons were Mithridates, Arcathius, Machares and Pharnaces II of Pontus. Their daughters were Cleopatra of Pontus (sometimes called Cleopatra the Elder to distinguish her from her sister of the same name) and Drypetina (a diminutive form of "Drypetis"). Drypetina was Mithridates VI's most devoted daughter. Her baby teeth never fell out, so she had a double set of teeth.

His second wife was a Greek Macedonian noblewoman, Monime. They were married from about 89/88 BC until 72/71 BC and had a daughter, Athenais, who married King Ariobarzanes II of Cappadocia. His next two wives were also Greek: he was married to his third wife Berenice of Chios, from 86 to 72/71 BC, and to his fourth wife Stratonice of Pontus, from sometime after 86 to 63 BC. Stratonice bore Mithridates a son Xiphares. His fifth wife is unknown. His sixth wife was Hypsicratea.

One of his mistresses was the Galatian Celtic princess Adobogiona the Elder. By Adobogiona, Mithridates had two children: a son called Mithridates I of the Bosporus and a daughter called Adobogiona the Younger.

His sons born from his concubines were Cyrus, Xerxes, Darius, Ariarathes IX of Cappadocia, Artaphernes, Oxathres, Phoenix (Mithridates' son by a mistress of Syrian descent), and Exipodras, named after kings of the Persian Empire, which he claimed ancestry from. His daughters born from his concubines were Nysa, Eupatra, Cleopatra the Younger, Mithridatis and Orsabaris. Nysa and Mithridatis, were engaged to the Egyptian Greek Pharaohs Ptolemy XII Auletes and his brother Ptolemy of Cyprus.

In 63 BC, when the Kingdom of Pontus was annexed by the Roman general Pompey, the remaining sisters, wives, mistresses and children of Mithridates VI in Pontus were put to death. Plutarch, writing in his Lives, states that Mithridates' sister and five of his children took part in Pompey's triumphal procession on his return to Rome in 61 BC.

The Cappadocian Greek nobleman and high priest of the temple-state of Comana, Cappadocia, Archelaus was descended from Mithridates VI. He claimed to be a son of Mithridates VI; but the chronology suggests that Archelaus may actually have been a maternal grandson of the Pontic king, and the son of Mithridates VI's favourite general, who may have married one of the daughters of Mithridates VI.

== Cultural depictions ==
- The demise of Mithridates VI is detailed in the 1673 play Mithridate written by Jean Racine. This play is the basis for several 18th-century operas including one of Mozart's earliest, known most commonly by its Italian name, Mitridate, re di Ponto (1770).
- Nathanial Lee wrote the play 'Mithridates, King of Pontus' in 1678
- Mithridates is the subject of the opera Mitridate Eupatore (1707) by Alessandro Scarlatti.
- Ralph Waldo Emerson included his "Mithridates" in his 1847 Poems.
- Alexandre Dumas's novel The Count of Monte Cristo refers to the potential of a mithridate as an instrument both of defense and offence.
- William Wordsworth, amidst casting about for poetic themes in The Prelude (Bk i vv 186 ff):

Sometimes, more sternly moved, I would relate

How vanquished Mithridates northward passed,
And, hidden in the cloud of years, became
Odin, the Father of a race by whom

Perished the Roman Empire.

- James Joyce alludes to Mithridates' immunity to poison in his love poem Though I Thy Mithridates Were.
- The poet A. E. Housman alludes to Mithridates' antidote in the final stanza of "Terence, This Is Stupid Stuff" in A Shropshire Lad:

There was a king reigned in the East:

There, when kings will sit to feast,
They get their fill before they think
With poisoned meat and poisoned drink.
He gathered all that springs to birth
From the many-venomed earth;
First a little, thence to more,
He sampled all her killing store;
And easy, smiling, seasoned sound,
Sate the king when healths went round.
They put arsenic in his meat
And stared aghast to watch him eat;
They poured strychnine in his cup
And shook to see him drink it up:
They shook, they stared as white's their shirt:
Them it was their poison hurt.
–I tell the tale that I heard told.

Mithridates, he died old.

- Dorothy L. Sayers' detective novel Strong Poison, from 1929, has the protagonist, Lord Peter Wimsey, solve a case of murder by arsenic poisoning, and quotes the last line from Housman's poem.
- In The Grass Crown, the second in the Masters of Rome series, Colleen McCullough describes in detail the various aspects of his life – the murder of Laodice, and the Roman Consul who, quite alone and surrounded by the Pontic army, ordered Mithridates to leave Cappadocia immediately and go back to Pontus – which he did.
- The Last King is a historical novel by Michael Curtis Ford about the King and his exploits against the Roman Republic.
- Mithridates is a major character in Poul Anderson's novel The Golden Slave.
- In the novel Mithridates is Dead (Spanish: Mitrídates ha muerto), Ignasi Ribó traces parallels between the historical figures of Mithridates and Osama bin Laden. Within a postmodern narrative of the making and unmaking of history, Ribó suggests that the September 11 attacks on the United States closely paralleled the massacre of Roman citizens in 88 BC and prompted similar consequences, namely the imperialist overstretch of the American and Roman republics respectively. Furthermore, he suggests that the ensuing Mithridatic Wars were one of the key factors in the demise of Rome's republican regime, as well as in the spread of the Christian faith in Asia Minor and eventually throughout the whole Roman Empire. The novel implies that the current events in the world might have similar unforeseen consequences.
- In The King's Gambit, the first volume of the SPQR series by John Maddox Roberts, the protagonist, Decius Metellus, becomes aware of a plot between Pompey and Crassus to relieve Lucullus of command and allow Pompey to lead the final campaign against Mithridates. At the time of this novel, Decius reflects that Mithradates has successfully resisted Roman military campaigns for so long that the public has built him up as some kind of superhuman bogeyman.
- Mithridates and his wife Monime are characters in Steven Saylor's 2015 novel Wrath of the Furies.
- The Iron Maiden song "The Parchment" in their album Senjutsu describes the life, rise and fall of Mithridates.

== See also ==
- Epistula Mithridatis
- Bosporan Kingdom
- Mithridatism (Mithridatization)
- Mithridatic Wars
- Roman Crimea

== Sources ==
- McGing, Brian (2004). "Pontus". Encyclopaedia Iranica.
- McGing, Brian (2009). "Mithridates VI". Encyclopaedia Iranica.
- Schmitt, Rüdiger (2005). "Personal names, Iranian iii. Achaemenid Period". Encyclopaedia Iranica.
- Mayor, Adrienne (2009). The Poison King: The Life and Legend of Mithradates, Rome's Deadliest Enemy. Princeton University Press. pp. 1–448. ISBN 9780691150260.

Preceded by Mithridates V	King of Pontus; 120–63 BC	Succeeded by Pharnaces II
