= Xiphares =

Xiphares (Ancient Greek: Ξιφάρης; c. 85 – 65 BC) was, according to Appian, a Pontic prince who was the son of King Mithridates VI of Pontus from his concubine and later wife Stratonice of Pontus.

During the Mithridatic Wars, Stratonice had been put in charge of a castle, where a secret underground treasury containing a great deal of money lay concealed in numerous iron-bound brazen vessels. While Mithridates was making his journey around the Euxine, she delivered the castle and the treasury to Pompey, on the condition that he should spare her son Xiphares if he were captured. Pompey took the money, promised to spare Xiphares, and allowed Stratonice to take her own belongings. When Mithridates learned of this, he killed Xiphares at the Bosporus, while Stratonice looked on from the opposite shore, and cast his body out unburied, thus wreaking his spite on the son in order to grieve the mother who had offended him.
