= List of ancient peoples of Anatolia =

Preclassical Age regions of Anatolia/Asia Minor with main settlements.

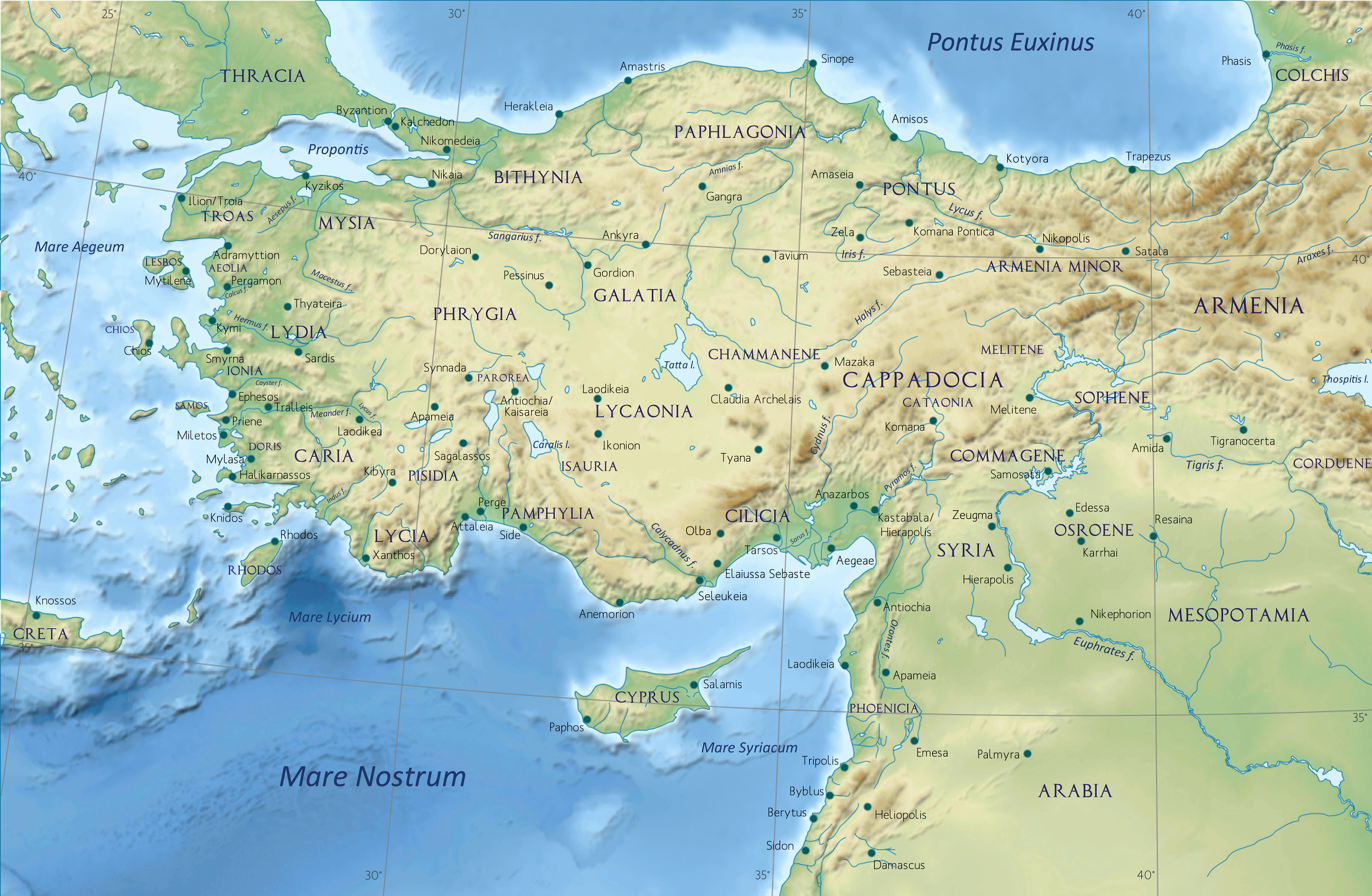
Classical regions of Asia Minor/Anatolia

Regions of Asia Minor/Anatolia, c. 500 BC. Aegean Greek settlements italicised

This is a list of peoples who inhabited Anatolia in antiquity. The essential purpose of the list is to identify prehistoric cultures in the region but many of the peoples continued to inhabit Anatolia into and through classical and late antiquity, so the actual scope of the list encompasses the history of Anatolia from prehistory to the Eastern Roman Empire (4th to 7th centuries AD), during which transition to the early medieval occurred.

Anatolia was inhabited by numerous peoples and its history is characterised by different waves of population movement. The earliest recorded inhabitants of Anatolia were the Hattians and Hurrians, non-Indo-European peoples who lived in Anatolia as early as c. 2300 BC. Indo-European Hittites came to Anatolia and gradually absorbed the Hattians and Hurrians c. 2000 – c. 1700 BC. Besides Hittites, Anatolian peoples included Luwians, Palaic peoples and Lydians. They spoke Anatolian languages. Other incoming people include Armenians, Greeks, Phrygians and Thracians.

== Assyrians ==
Ancient Assyrians spoke multiple languages such as Akkadian, Sumerian and Aramaic.

== Hattians ==
The Hattians occupied the land of Hatti in central Anatolia and are documented at least as early as the empire of Sargon of Akkad (c. 2300 BC). Possibly connected to Northwest Caucasians.

== Hurrians ==
- Mitanni (seem to have been Hurrian with an Indo-Aryan ruling class)
- Isuwans (seem to have been a mixed Anatolian, Hurrian, and Mitanni population)
- Kizzuwatnans
- Urartu

== Indo-European peoples ==
=== Anatolian peoples (Anatolian Indo-European) ===
==== Hittites ====
- Cappadocians? / Leucosyri? (Cappadocians and Leucosyri were the same people; Cappadocians was the Persian name and Leukosyroi the Greek name, Leucosyri is the Latin name based on Greek) (Cappadocians also inhabited the West Pontus that originally was part of Cappadocia)
  - Amiseni? (inhabited Themiscyra district in West Pontus)
  - Kases? / Cases?
- Cataonians?

==== Luwians ====
- Carians
- Cilicians
  - Clitae
- Isaurians
- Leleges?
- Lycaonians
- Lycians
- Philistines? - notably inhabited southern Israel; their inclusion here is tenuous as they may have had an Anatolian origin
- Pisidians / Pamphylians (Pamphylians, on the coast, and Pisidians, in the inland, were the same people and spoke the same language, the difference was that Anatolian Pamphylians were more Greek influenced since Iron Age) (there was an Anatolian Pamphylian dialect, part of the Pisidian language, and a Pamphylian Greek dialect, part of Ancient Greek, depending on the degree of Hellenization)
  - Homanades (Homana or Homona was their main settlement)
- Sidians
- Solymoi / Solymi
  - Milyans / Milyae
- Telchines?

Western Anatolian

- Lydians
  - Kaystrianoi / Caystriani
  - Kilbianoi / Cilbiani
- Trojans

==== Palaic peoples ====
- Paphlagonians?
  - Caucones? / Kaukauni?
  - Heneti?
  - Mariandyni?

Possible Anatolian (Indo-European) peoples

- Mysians? (possibly they were more related to the Phrygians, a non Anatolian Indo-European people, and therefore they were possibly not an Anatolian Indo-European people, Mysia was also known as Phrygia Hellespontica, however they probably had a mixing with an Anatolian people closer to the Lydians that would explain contradictory statements by ancient authors)
  - Milatai? / Milatae?
- Isuwans? (seem to have been a mixed Anatolian, Hurrian, and Mitanni population)

=== Celts ===
==== Galatians ====
- Tectosages
- Tolistobogii / Tolistobogioi
- Trocmi / Trokmoi
- Aigosages, between Troy and Cyzicus
- Daguteni, in modern Marmara region around Orhaneli
- Inovanteni, east of the Trocnades
- Okondiani, between Phrygia and Galatia northeast of modern Akşehir Gölü
- Rigosages, unlocated

=== Greeks ===
- Central-Eastern Greeks
  - Central Greeks
    - Aeolians
  - Eastern Greeks
    - Achaeans (possible inhabitants of a land called Ahhiyawa by the Hittites)
    - Ionians
- Western Greeks
  - Dorians

=== Phrygians ===
- Kaourkoi / Caurci?
- Fontes?

==== Mysians ====
- Mysians (possibly they were more related to the Phrygians, a non Anatolian Indo-European people, and therefore they were possibly not an Anatolian Indo-European people, Mysia was also known as Phrygia Hellespontica, however they probably had a mixing with an Anatolian people closer to the Lydians that would explain contradictory statements by ancient authors)
  - Milatai? / Milatae?

=== Possible Indo-European peoples ===
==== Hayasa-Azzi ====
- Hayasans (Proto-Armenians?)
- Azzians (Proto-Armenians?)

==== Mushki ====
- Mushki
  - Western Mushki (synonymous of the Phrygians? and related Mysians?)
  - Eastern Mushki (Proto-Armenians?)
    - Moschi-Mossynoeci
      - Moschi (possible Mushki, Indo-European?, origin, assimilated by old Kartvelian peoples and named Meskhetians, the inhabitants of Meskheti in far southwestern Georgia - Sakartvelo)
      - Mossynoeci (possible Mushki, Indo-European?, origin, assimilated by old Kartvelian peoples and named Meskhetians, the inhabitants of Meskheti in far southwestern Georgia - Sakartvelo)

==== Urumu ====
- Urumu (Proto-Armenians?), allied with Mushki and Kaskians, possibly Arimi of Greek sources and Arme/Urme/Armini of Urartian sources

==== Tibareni ====
- Tibareni (several Classical Antiquity authors such as Herodotus, Xenophon and Strabo believed that they were of Scythian origin)

==== Diauehi ====
- Mentioned by Assyrians as one of the Nairi tribes inhabiting the Palu or Mush regions, later mentioned by Urartians in the vicinity of Kars Province, probably the Taochoi of Greek sources

== Kartvelian peoples ==
=== Colchians ===
- Byzeres (The name of the historical region Odzrkhe is derived from the name of this tribe - Vidzerukh / Viterukh / Odzr(a)khe / Odzrkhe)
- Drilae / Sanni
  - Drilae (according to Arrian, Drilae and Sanni were the same people) (ancestors of present-day Zans)
  - Sanni (ancestors of present-day Zans)
- Machelones-Macrones
  - Machelones (closely related to the Macrones)
  - Macrones (ancestors of present-day Mingrelians)
- Marres
- Phasians
- Zydretae

=== Possible Kartvelian peoples ===
==== Eastern Mushki ====
- Moschi-Mossynoeci
  - Moschi (possible Mushki, Kartvelian?, origin, and named Meskhetians, the inhabitants of Meskheti in far southwestern Georgia - Sakartvelo)
  - Mossynoeci (possible Mushki, Kartvelian?, origin, and named Meskhetians, the inhabitants of Meskheti in far southwestern Georgia - Sakartvelo)

==== Tibareni ====
- Tibareni (several Classical Antiquity authors such as Herodotus, Xenophon and Strabo believed that they were of Scythian origin)

== Kaskians ==
Possibly connected to Hattians and/or Northwest Caucasians.

== See also ==
- List of ancient peoples of Italy
- Ancient regions of Anatolia
