= List of ancient Colchian tribes =

Kartvelian tribes

The following is a list of ancient Colchian tribes.

== List of ancient Colchian tribes ==
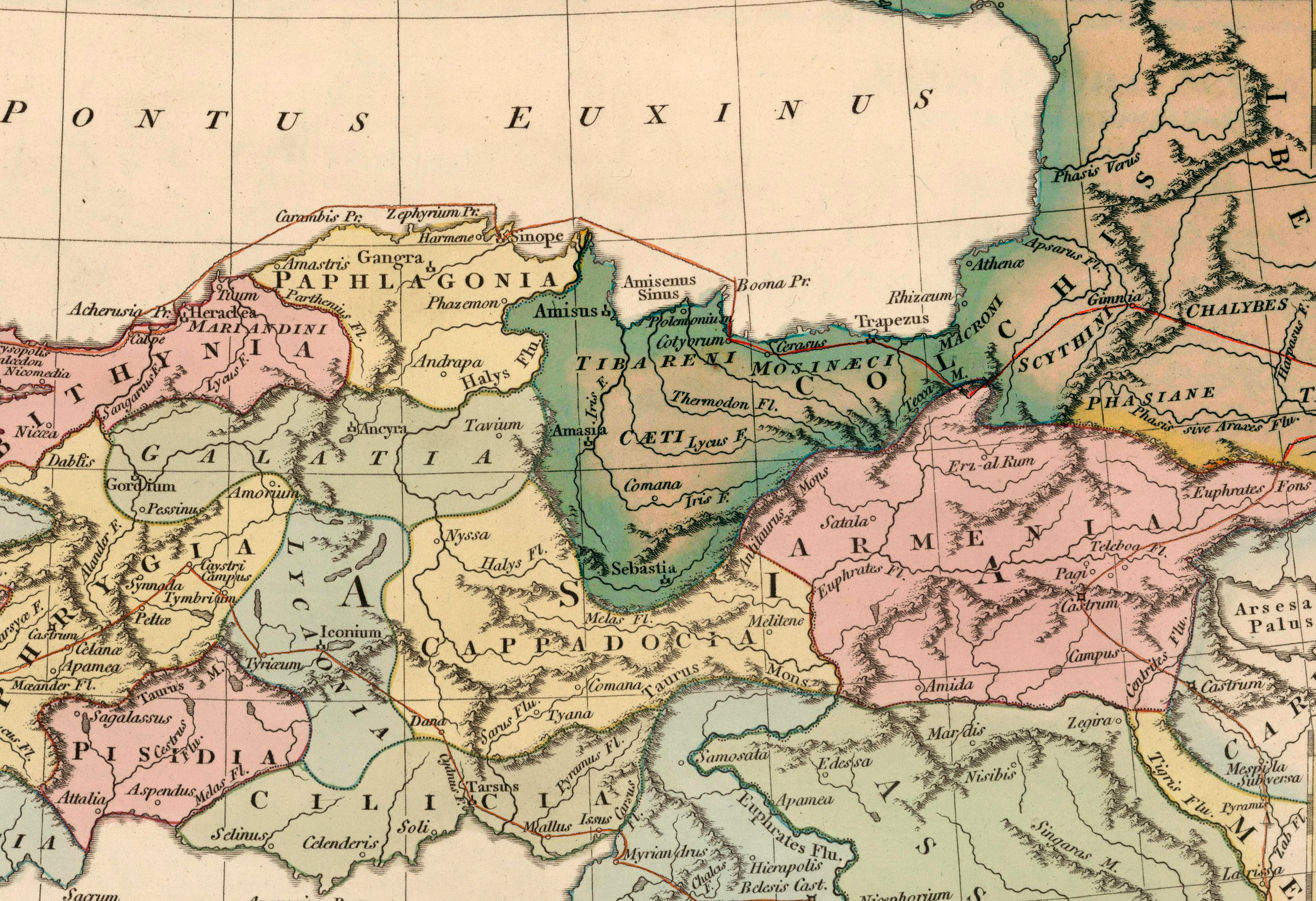
Southern Colchis. From "Reditus Decem Millium Graecorum", 1815

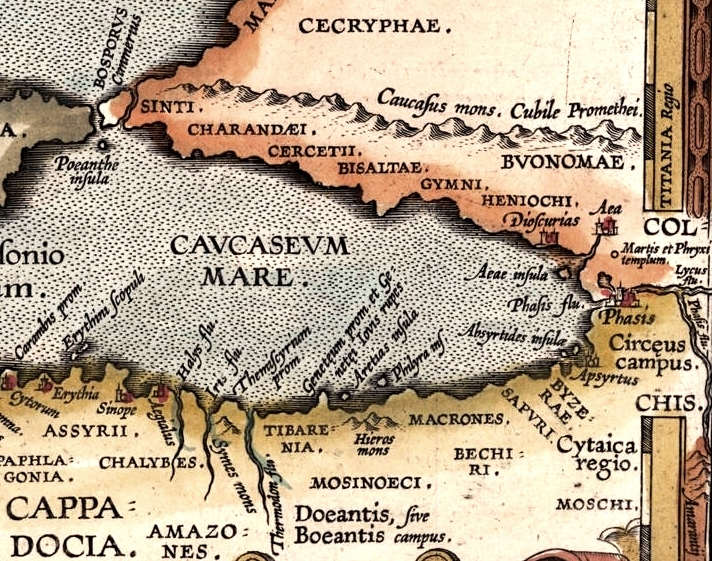
Map of the voyage of the Argonauts by Abraham Ortelius, 1624

Name	Location	Sources
Byzeres	south of the Coruh River and Pontic Mountains.	mentioned in Urartean sources as uiterukhi or uitirukhi.
Drilae	southern shores of the Black Sea.	attested in Xenophon's book Anabasis
Machelones	south of the Rioni river.	Pliny (NH 6.4.11), Lucian, Ptolemy, Arrian.
Macrones	near Moschici Mountains	Herodotus, Xenophon, Strabo (xii.3.18), Stephanus of Byzantium, Pliny, Procopius.
Marres	southeast periphery of the Black Sea	Herodotus
Mossynoeci	west of Trebizond	mentioned in Apollonius of Rhodes's Argonautica, Xenophon's Anabasis (5.4.26-34), Herodotus.
Phasians	eastern part of Pontus	Xenophon, Hippocrates.
Sanni	near Trebizond	Strabo, Pliny, Arrian, Theodoret of Cyrrus.
Tubal/Tibareni	Black Sea coast of Anatolia	Herodotus, Xenophon, Strabo and other classical authors.
Zydretae	southern side of the Coruh river	Arrian.
Heniochi	northwest shores of Colchis	Aristotle, Artemidorus Ephesius, Ovid, Pliny, Arrian, Strabo and others.
Lazi	Phasis river basin	Scylax, Procopius, Agathias, Pliny.
Moschi	Cappadocia	Hecataeus of Miletus, Herodotus, Strabo, Stephanus of Byzantium.
Apsilae	modern Abkhazia	Pliny, Arrian.
Abasgoi	western Abkhazia	Pliny, Strabo, Arrian.
Soanes	Heights of Dioscuria, modern Abkhazia.	Strabo
Coraxi	northwest shores of Colchis	Strabo.
Sanigs	western Abkhazia	Pliny, Arrian, Memnon of Heraclea.
Tzanni	modern day Rize and Artvin provinces	Arrian, Procopius.
Chalybes/Chaldoi	Chaldia	Homer, Strabo, Xenophon.

== See also ==
- Colchis
