= Kolkheti National Park =

National park in Georgia

Kolkheti (mingrelia) National Park
- IUCN category II (national park)
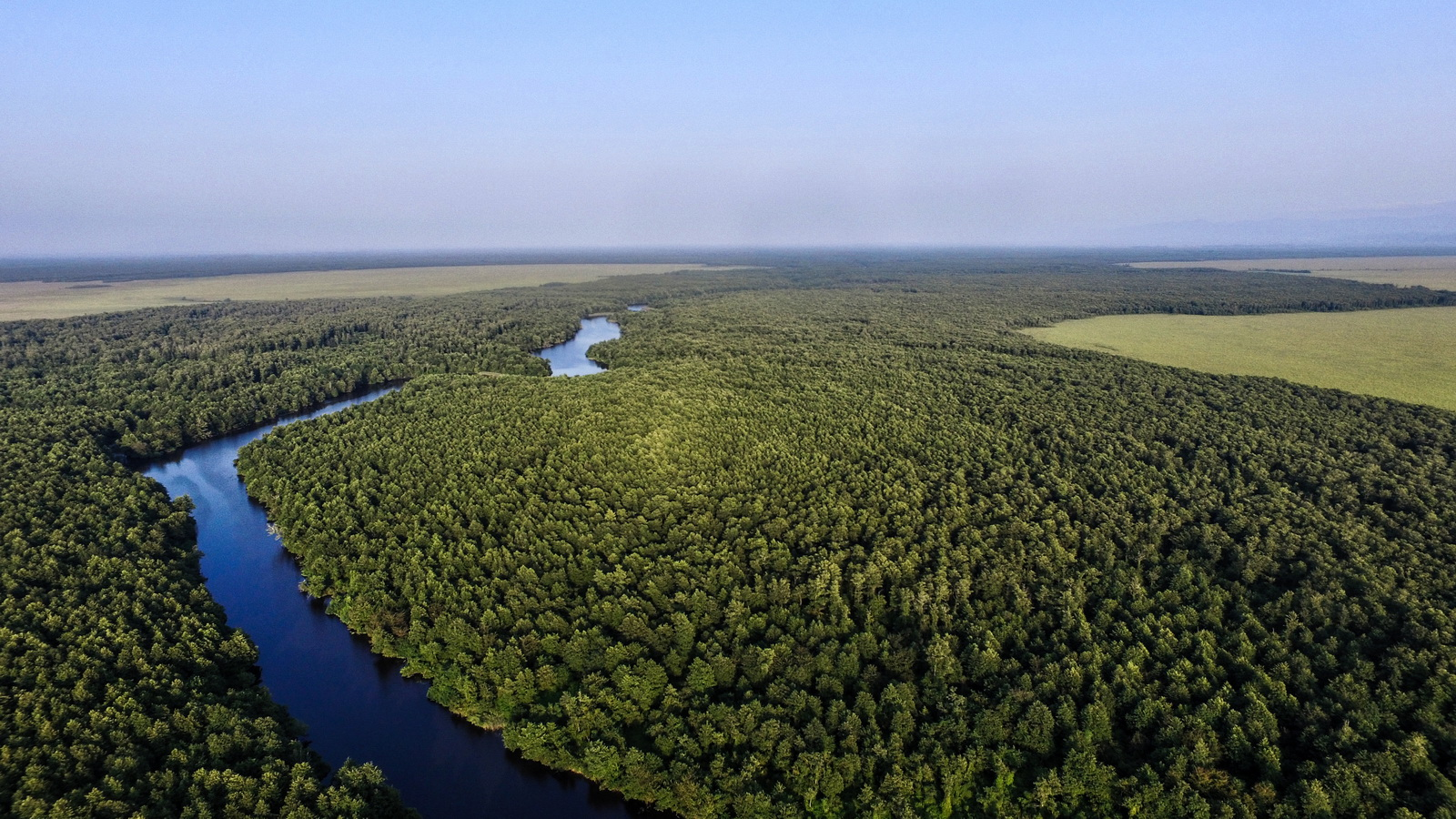
- Pichori river in Kolkheti National Park

- Location within Georgia Location within Samegrelo-Zemo Svaneti
- Location: Georgia
- Coordinates: 42°6′39″N 41°41′46″E
- Area: 807.99 km^{2} (311.97 sq mi)
- Established: 1998–1999
- Visitors: 13,747 (in 2015)
- Governing body: Agency of Protected Areas
- Website: Kolkheti National Park Administration

Ramsar Wetland
- Official name: Wetlands of Central Kolkheti
- Designated: 7 February 1997
- Reference no.: 893

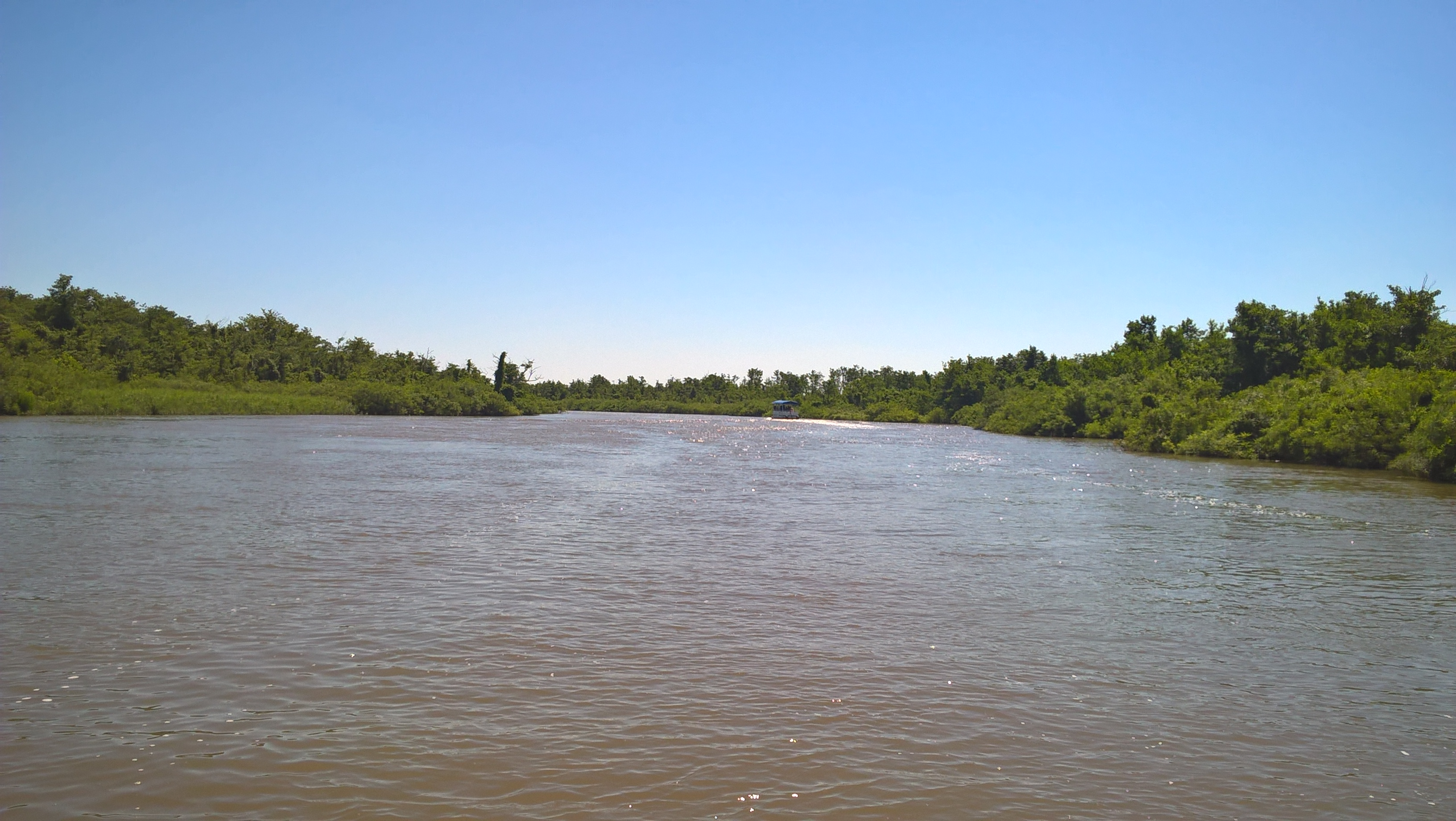
Paliastomi lake in Kolkheti National Park.

Kolkheti National Park (Georgian: კოლხეთის ეროვნული პარკი), is a national park located in Samegrelo-Zemo Svaneti and Guria in the historical region of Colchis in western Georgia. The wetlands of Central Kolkheti are a Wetland of International Importance, a Ramsar Site. It lies on a coastal plain on the Black Sea, between the mouths of the Tikori and Supsa and spanning the districts of Zugdidi, Khobi, Lanchkhuti, Senaki and Abasha. The park was established during 1998 and 1999 as part of Georgia's Integrated Coastal Management Project, which was backed financially by the World Bank (WB) and the Global Environmental Facility (GEF). Kolkheti National Park covers an area of 28,940 hectares and with protected wetlands protected area spans to 33710 hectares, incorporating the land of the former 500-hectare Kolkheti State Nature Reserve, which had been established in 1947, and its surrounding wetlands, including the lake Paliastomi. Because of its unique forests and wetlands, and high numbers of threatened species, the park was inscribed on the UNESCO World Heritage List as part of the Colchic Rainforests and Wetlands site in 2021.

== History ==
=== Ancient history of Kolkheti ===
Kolkheti National Park was once part of the tropical and partly subtropical zone of the Tertiary period that stretched over the continent of Eurasia. Around 2000 BC, the first Georgian state, Kolkheti, better known as "Colchis", was created here and was the place in which the first Georgian coinage, "Kolkhuri Tetri", was minted. Colchis features in Greek mythology as the rim of the world, and has been mentioned in historical chronicles across western Asia and eastern Europe since ancient times. Colchis appears in the myth of Jason and the Argonauts and his pursuit of the Golden Fleece. Colchis was also the land where the mythological Prometheus was punished by being chained to a mountain while an eagle ate at his liver for revealing the secret of fire to humanity. Amazons also were said to be of Scythian origin from Colchis. The main mythical characters from Colchis are Aeëtes, Idyia, Pasiphaë, Circe, Medea, Chalciope and Absyrtus.

The advanced economy and favorable geographical and natural conditions of the area attracted the Milesian Greeks who colonized the Colchian coast, establishing trading posts in the area at Phasis, Gyenos, and Sukhumi in the 6th-5th centuries BC. These sites lay just outside the lands conquered by Alexander the Great in the 4th century BC. After the demise of the Persian Empire, a significant part of Colchis became known locally as Egrisi and was annexed to the recently created Kingdom of Iberia (Kartli) in c. 302 BC. This region retained a degree of independence until conquered in c. 101 BC by Mithridates VI of Pontus.

The region became inhabited by a number of related but distinct tribes whose settlements lay chiefly along the shore of the Black Sea. Numbered amongst these were the Machelones, Heniochi, Zydretae, Apsilae, Lazi, Chalybes, Tabal, Tibareni, Mossynoeci, Macrones, Mushki and Marres.

During the rule of the Roman Empire, the Romans established major fortresses along the sea coast, but they found it increasingly difficult to maintain order. The lowlands and coastal area of what forms the marine area of the park today were frequently raided by the fierce mountainous tribes, with the Soani and Heniochi being the most powerful of them. In 69 AD, the people of Pontus and Colchis under Anicetus staged a major uprising against the Romans, who had grown increasingly weak during this time. By the 130s, the kingdoms of Machelones, Heniochi, Egrisi, Apsilia, Abasgia, and Sanigia had occupied the area from south to north. Goths, dwelling in the Crimea and looking for a new home, raided Colchis in 253, but they were repulsed with the help of the Roman garrison of Pitsunda. By the 3rd-4th centuries, most of the local kingdoms and principalities had been subjugated by the Lazic kings, and thereafter the country was generally referred to as Lazica (Egrisi).

=== Modern history and developments ===
In modern times, large-scale drainage undertaken by the Soviet authorities, especially in the 1920s to develop the economy, had a devastating impact on the wetland ecosystem and in 1947 led to a small 500-hectare reserve being established, called the Kolkheti State Nature Reserve. However, given that the surrounding wetlands contained much rich biogeographical and paleogeographical information of high importance to scientists and to Georgian national heritage, the area was granted Ramsar status in 1996. This led to the Kolkheti National Park being formally established as a national park between 1998 and 1999, financially supported by the World Bank and the Global Environmental Facility.

Local and international NGOs petitioned against the oil terminal and Green Alternative, a Georgian NGO, were particularly active in the protests but without initial success. In the end, the construction of the Kulevi Terminal was abandoned in late 2002, reportedly because of financial reasons, but the marine area of the Kolkheti National Park still clashes with land permitted to oil and gas companies for oil exploitation, conflicting with the official designated protected area.

== Hydrology ==
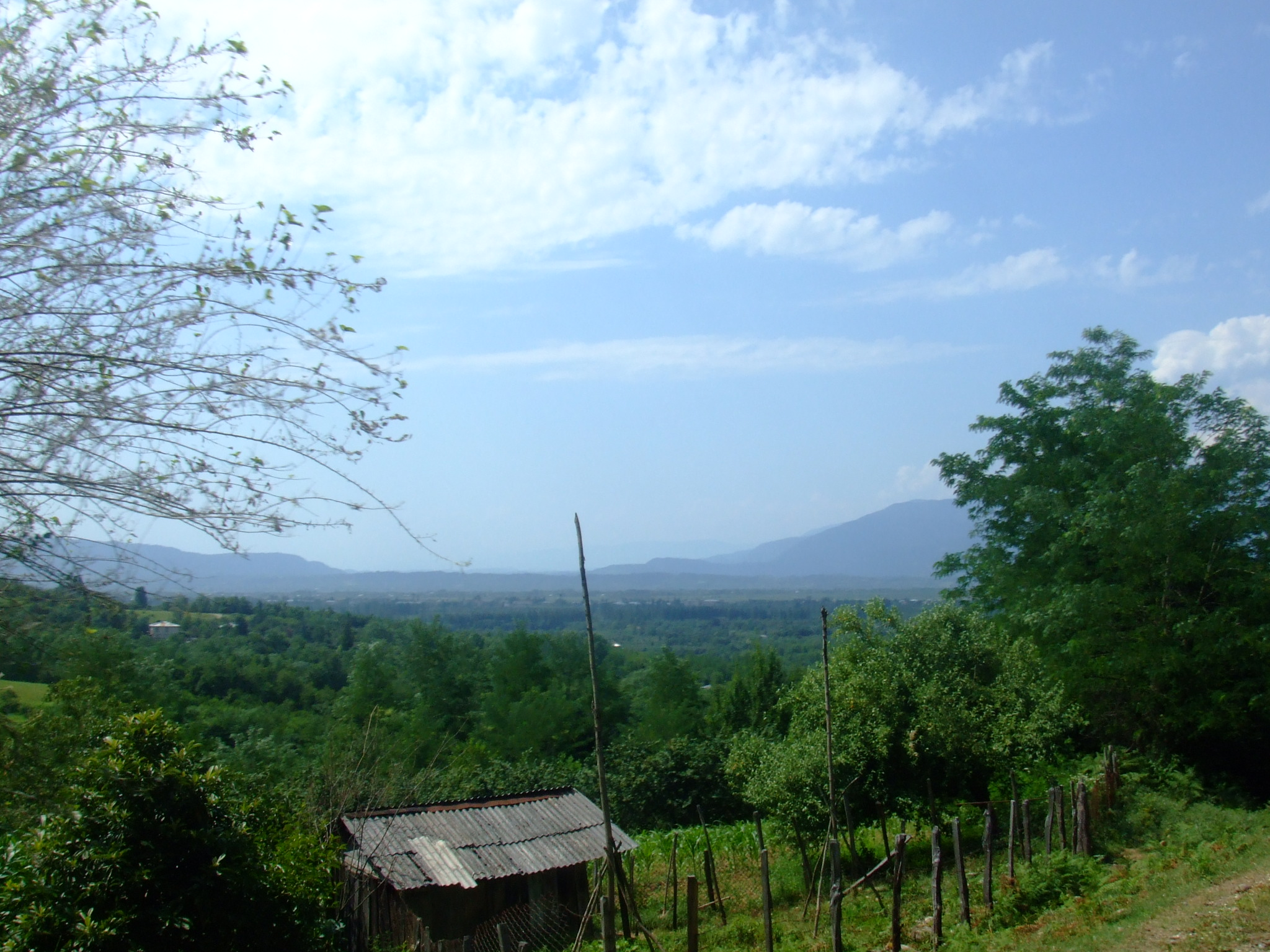
Landscape in Zugdidi District

Over half the park, 15,742 hectares, consists of wetlands. Many small stagnant rivers including the Pichori River, Kukani River, Dedabera River, Tkhorina River, Tsia River, Tsiva River, Churia River, Munchia River, Mukhurjina River and other smaller streams flow through the park mainly through flat coastal plain at an average elevation of 0–10 metres. A narrow dune ridge, some 100-200-meters-wide has developed along the Black Sea shore that rises some 2–3 m above the coastal plain. Much of the land is peat bog and marsh, some of which form several distinct peat bogs, including Anaklia, Churia, Nabada, Imnati, Maltakva, Grigoleti and Pichori which are located on the coastal plain. In places peat layers may exceed 12 meters in thickness, the result of clay, sand, silt and peat deposits over the last 4000 to 6000 years. In some areas the marsh is indunated completely with a number of lakes including Lake Paliastomi, Patara Paliastomi Lake, Imnati Lake and Parto Tskali Lake.

== Climate ==
The climate of Kolkheti National Park is warm and humid climate and annual rainfall ranges from 1500 to 1600 mm, relatively equal through the year. The park is subject to heavy periodical coastal winds and the coldest month, January can reach temperatures as low as 4.5 degrees Celsius. During the summer it is a moderate temperature, reaching 22 degrees Celsius in August on average. However, in August, temperatures have been known to reach as high as 34 degrees Celsius.

== Wildlife ==
=== Flora ===
The climate of the park and abundance of water has resulted in a rich bioversity of flora in the coastal marshes and swamped forests and the deciduous wetland forest, is composed mostly of bearded alder, several species of willows and oaks and common ash.

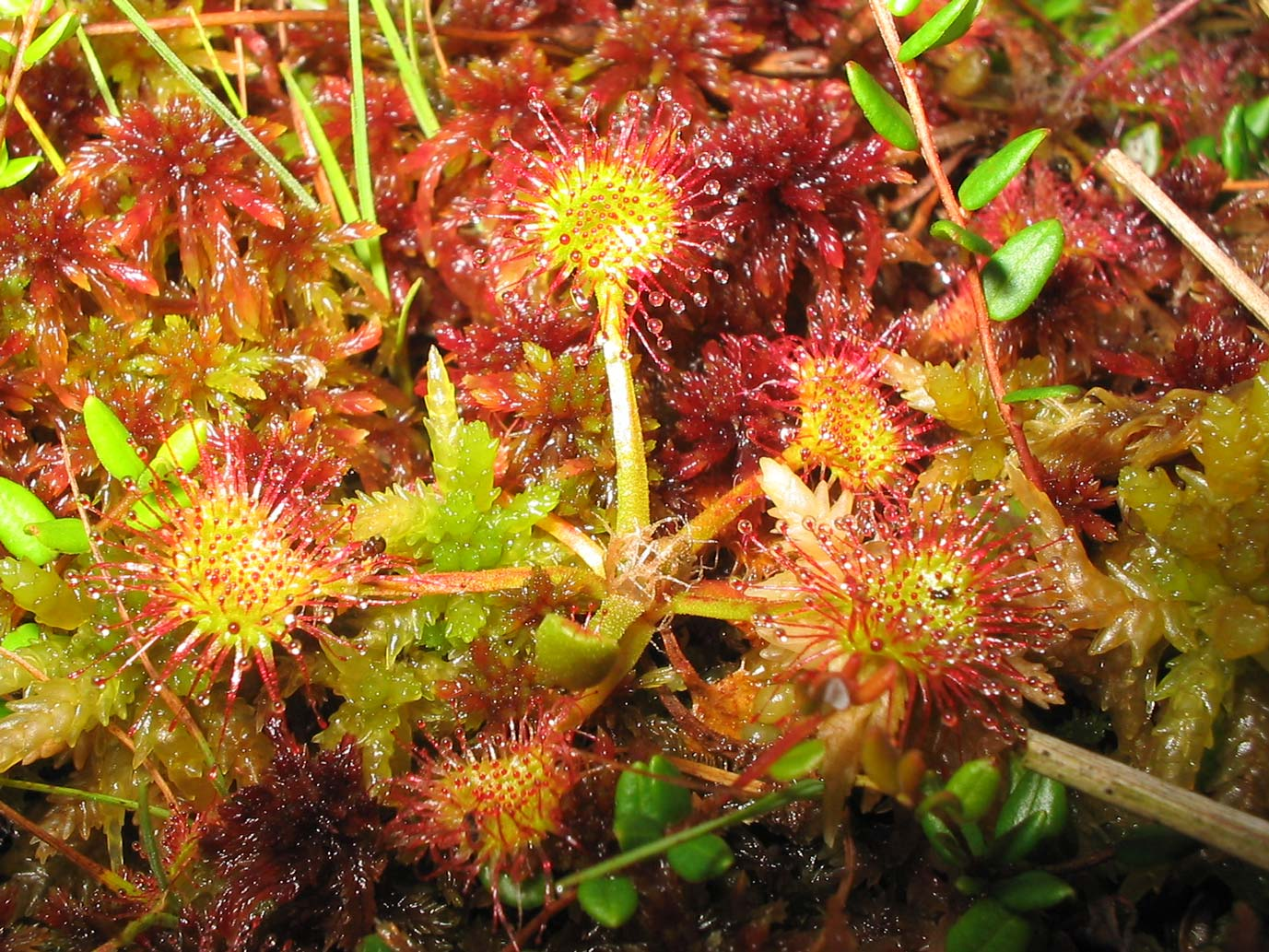
Drosera rotundifolia

The coastal peat bogs are the home to many types of plants including sphagnum mosses, Drosera rotundifolia, Rhynchospora alba, Carex lasiocarpa and Menyanthes trifoliata. In the forests, evergreen undergrowth tends to grow such as Hedera colchica and endemic species such as Quercus imeretina, Quercus dshorochensis and Quercus hartwissiana, and Alnus barbata and Pterocarya pterocarpa are commonly found. Aquatic plants, such as Nymphaea alba are common around much of the hydrological habitats of the park while Rhododendron luteum and Rhododendron ponticum are known to grow away from the coast in the alpine area of Kolkheti National Park.

=== Fauna ===
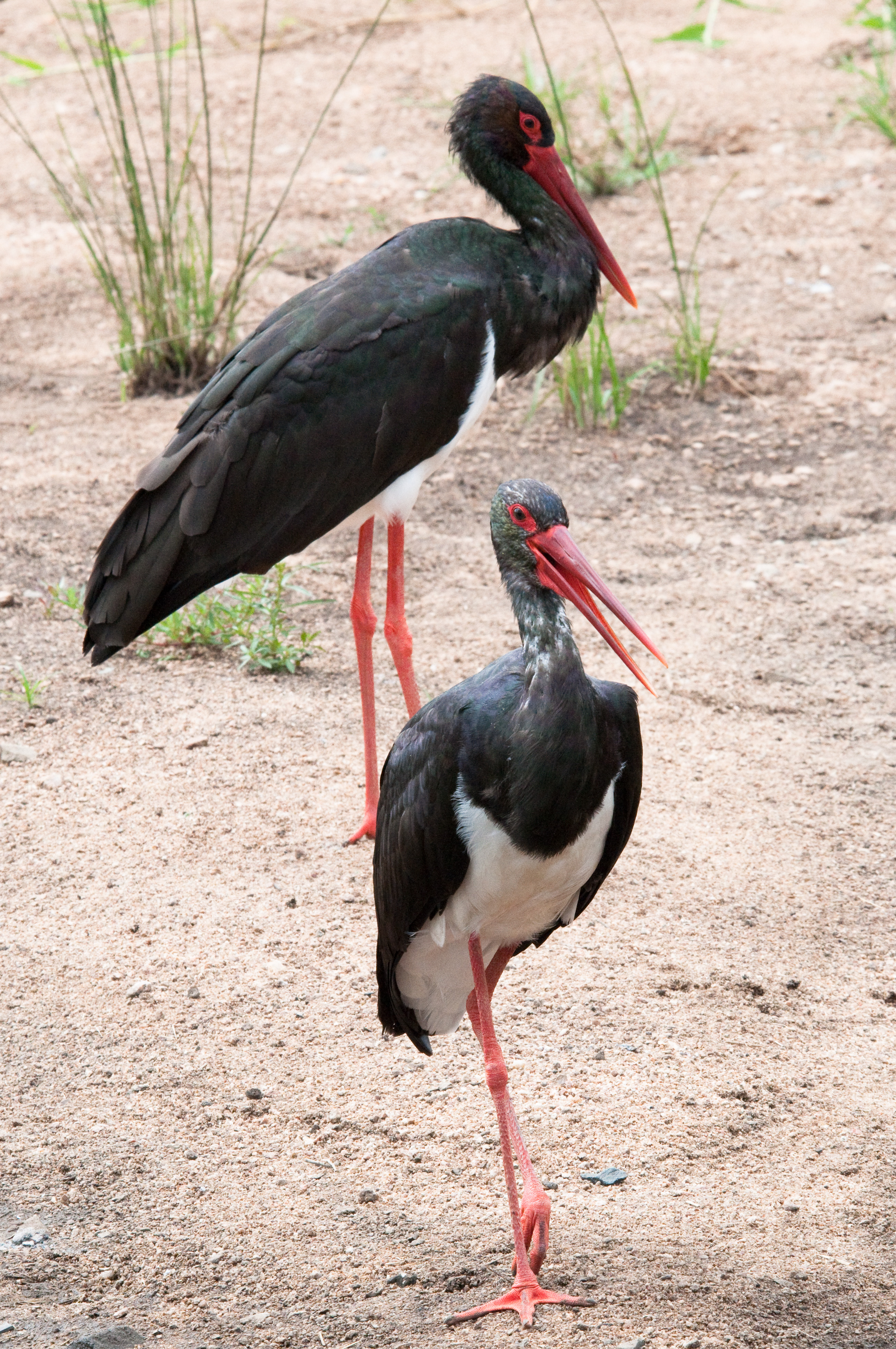
Black storks

The swamps and wetland forests of the park contain a number of endangered species such as roe deer, boar, otter and Triturus vittatus, and more recently a population of coypu has been introduced. It is home to the Caucasian subspecies of common treefrog and marsh frog (Rana ridibunda) and numerous types of snake, including ringed snake, dice snake, slowworm, and more rarely the Aesculapian snake. The European pond turtle (Emys orbicularis), and Artwin wood lizard are also found as are common and Southern crested newt. Several species of dolphins including Delphinus delphis, Tursiops truncatus and Phocoena phocoena inhabit the marine habitat of the park while 194 different bird species are found in the national park, including 21 species who use the area during seasonal migration. Some of the birds endemic to the park are on the IUCN and Georgian Red Book list because they are verging on extinction in the area, including the black stork, crane and great white egret. The great crested grebe, red-necked grebe, black-necked grebe, great cormorant, squacco heron, Eurasian spoonbill, glossy ibis, lesser white-fronted goose, ruddy shelduck, marsh sandpiper, great snipe, and a diversity of ducks, waders, coots, gulls and terns are common to the park during season and a number of white-tailed sea eagles have been recorded in the park, although these are very rare.

== Tourism ==
Despite the protection of the park, the Georgian government has recently found a way to attract tourists whilst maintaining and protecting the natural habitat. The park was opened to tourists in 2007, attracting 1000 people in that year. Boating tours, notably on Lake Paliastomi and on the Pichori River are offered, as are diving, bird watching, hiking and horse riding. There are several boating trails that range from 3 kilometers long to greater than 10 kilometers long.

== See also ==
- Rioni River
- Katsoburi Managed Reserve
- Kobuleti Managed Reserve
