= List of ancient Anatolian peoples =

This is a list of ancient Anatolian peoples who lived in Anatolia, specifically those associated with the Anatolian branch of the Indo-European language family, the Anatolian languages.

== Ancestors ==
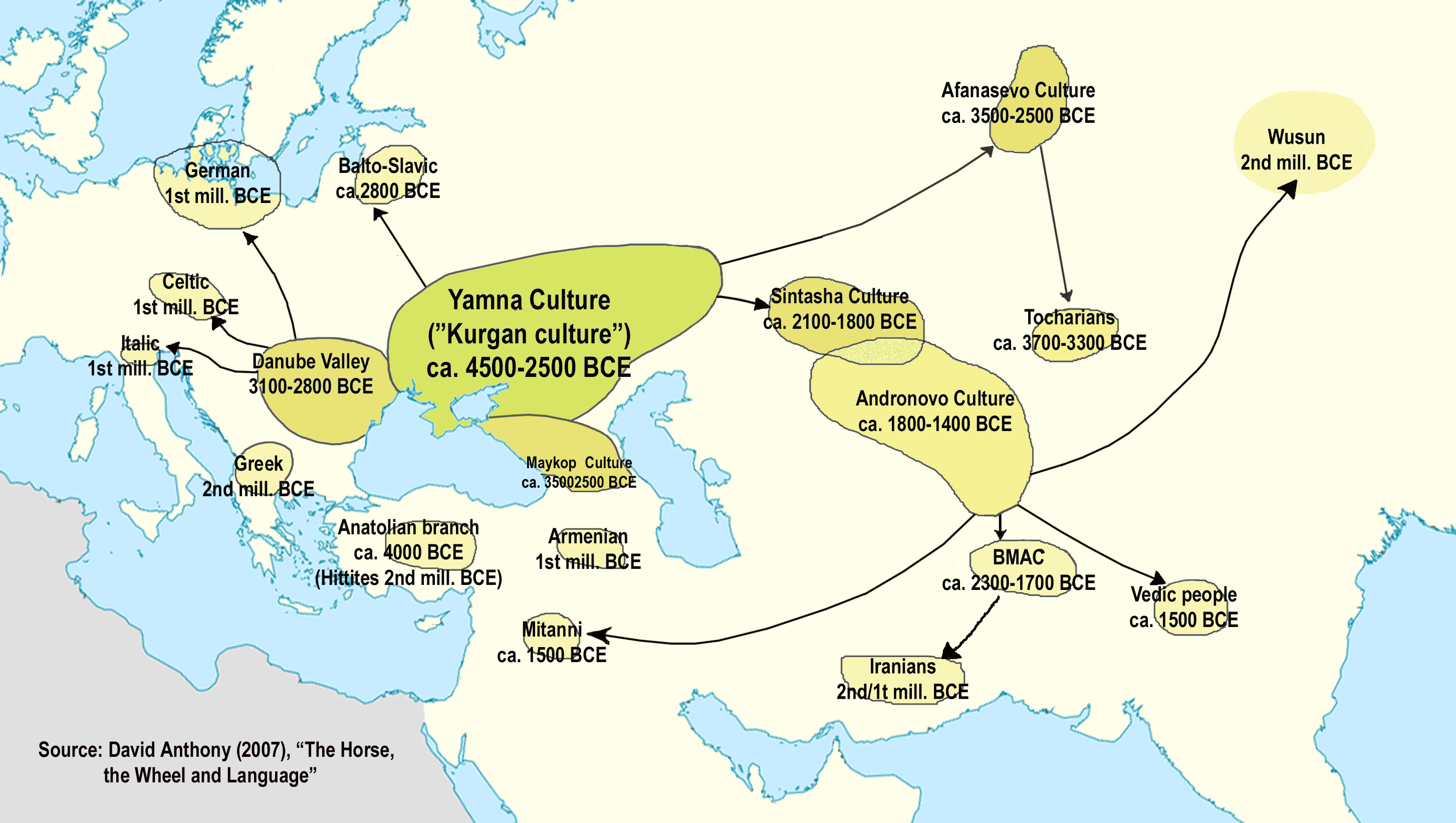
Map 1: Indo-European migrations as described in The Horse, the Wheel, and Language by David W. Anthony.

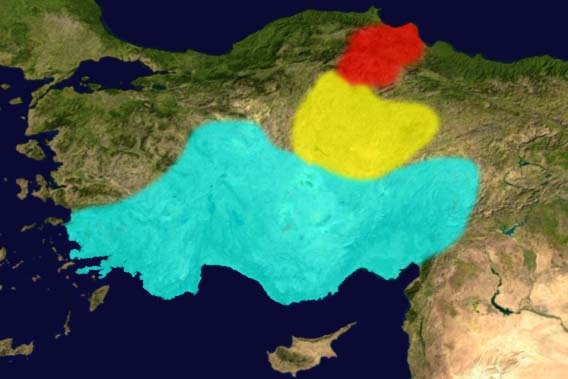
Map 2: Anatolian peoples in 2nd millennium BC Palaics Hittites Luwians

Map 3: Late Bronze Age regions of Anatolia / Asia Minor (circa 1200 BC) with main settlements.

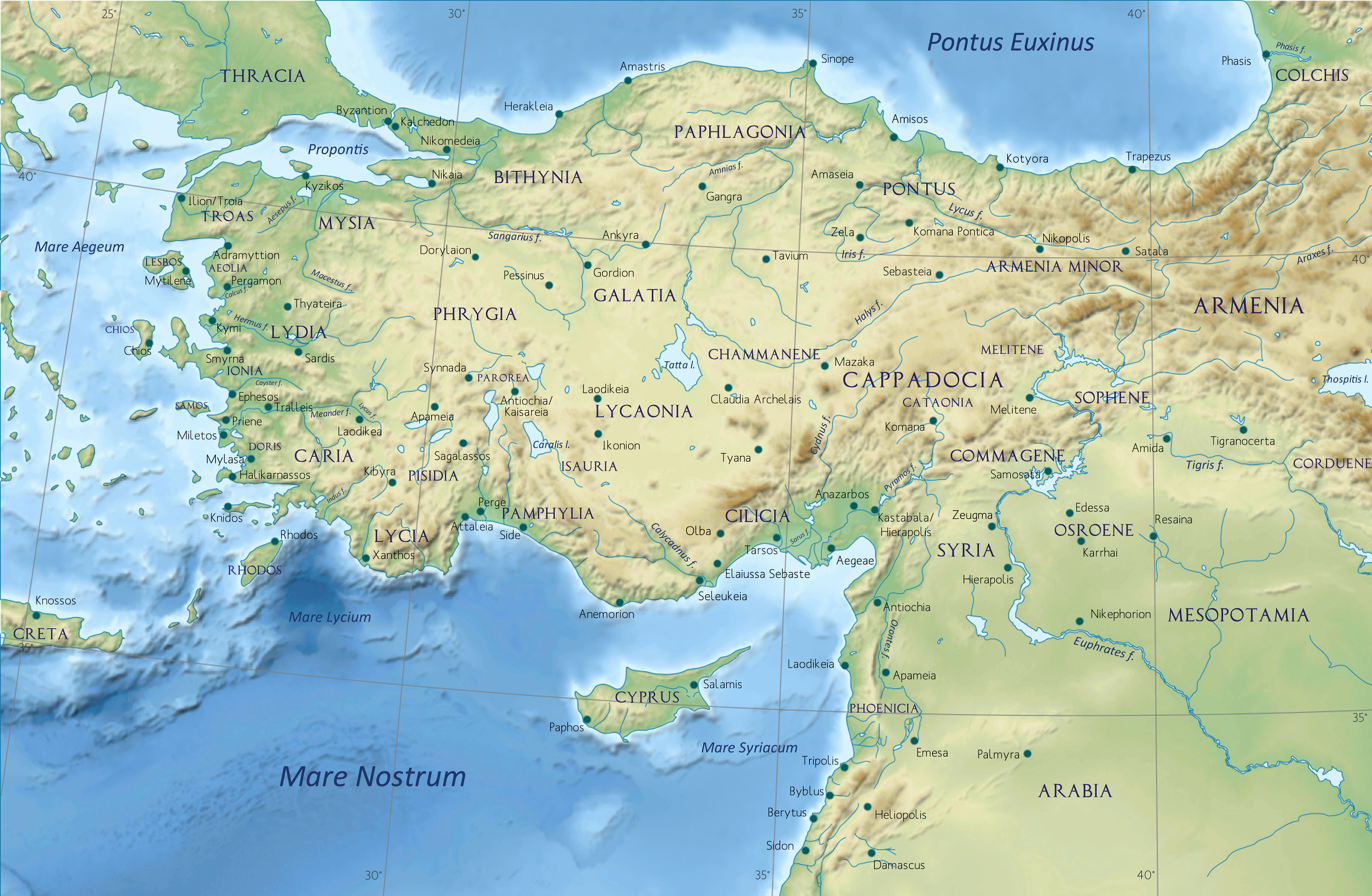
Map 4: Anatolia / Asia Minor in the Greco-Roman period. The classical regions and their main settlements (circa 200 BC).

- Proto-Indo-Europeans – Proto-Indo-European speakers
  - Proto-Anatolians – Indo-European Proto-Anatolian speakers

== Hittites (Nesitic/Central Anatolians) ==
- Hittites / Nesites (𒉈𒅆𒇷 – Nesumines)
  - Cappadocians / Leucosyri? – according to Herodotus, Cappadocians and Leucosyri were the same people. Cappadocians was the Persian name and Leucosyri the Greek name. Cappadocians also inhabited the West Pontus that was originally part of Cappadocia.
    - Amiseni? – inhabited Themiscyra district in West Pontus
    - Cases/Kases?
    - West Pontians?

== Luwics (Southern Anatolians) ==
- Luwians
  - Cataonians – possibly assimilated by the Cappadocians in the Classical Age; in the Bronze Age and early Iron Age, Cataonia was part of the Neo-Hittite kingdoms who spoke Luwian; in classical antiquity, Strabo states that although they were distinct peoples, they spoke the same language as the Cappadocians.
  - Cilicians
    - Danuna – lived in the "Land of the Danuna"; may have been the inhabitants of Adana, Adaniya or Ataniya city and region in Cilicia and also may have been the people called Denyen, one of the Sea Peoples, by the ancient Egyptians
    - Clitae – recorded by Tacitus to have lived in the Taurus Mountains range during the reign of Archelaus of Cappadocia, primarily on two hills named Cadra and Davara
  - Isaurians
  - Lycaonians
  - Philistines? – may have been called the Peleset, one of the Sea Peoples, by the ancient Egyptians
  - Southwest
    - Carians
    - Leleges
    - Pamphylians (Non-Hellenics)
    - Pisidio-Sidians
      - Pisidians / Pamphylians – Pamphylians, on the coast, and Pisidians, in the inland, were the same people and spoke the same language, but Anatolian Pamphylians were more Greek influenced since Iron Age. There was an Anatolian Pamphylian dialect, part of the Pisidian language, and a Pamphylian Greek dialect, part of Ancient Greek, depending on the degree of Hellenization.
        - Homanades – Homana or Homona was their main settlement
      - Sidians – in Side region
    - Solymoi / Solymi – according to Strabo, this was the older name of the Milyans. They may have been the same people as the Lycians.
      - Milyans / Milyae – Lycian B speakers
        - Lycians / Termilae (𐊗𐊕𐊐𐊎𐊆𐊍𐊆 – Trm̃mili = Trəmmili (m̃ = əm))
    - Telchines?
    - Lasonians? (Ancient Greek: Λασονίων, romanized: Lasoníōn) – part of the 2nd Taxation district of the Persian Empire
    - Cabalians? (Ancient Greek: Καβαλέων, romanized: Kabaléōn) – part of the 2nd Taxation district of the Persian Empire
    - Hytennians? (Ancient Greek: Ὑτεννέων, romanized: Hutennéōn) – part of the 2nd Taxation district of the Persian Empire

== Possible Western Anatolians ==
Related to but not part of Luwics:

- Lydians / Maeonians (Maíones, 𐤮𐤱𐤠𐤭𐤣𐤸𐤯𐤦𐤳 – Śfardẽtis)
  - Kaystrianoi / Caystriani
  - Kilbianoi / Cilbiani
- Trojans / Taruisans?

== Palaics (Northern Anatolian) ==
- Palaics – in Pala region, northern Anatolia or Asia Minor
  - Paphlagonians – mainly in Paphlagonia, roughly matching Pala, northern Anatolia or Asia Minor
    - Caucones / Kaukauni?
    - Eneti / Heneti?
    - Mariandyni

== Possible Anatolian (Indo-European) peoples ==
- Mysians? – may have been more related to the Phrygians, a non Anatolian Indo-European people, and therefore may not have been an Anatolian Indo-European people. Mysia was also known as Phrygia Hellespontica, though they probably mixed with an Anatolian people closer to the Lydians, which would explain some statements by ancient authors such as Strabo when he stated that the Mysian language was, in a way, a mixture of the Lydian and Phrygian languages.
  - Milatai / Milatae?

== See also ==
- Anatolians
- List of ancient peoples of Anatolia
- Mitanni
- Kassites
- Purushanda
- Hyksos
- Maryannu
- Kikkuli
- Ancient regions of Anatolia
