= Clitae =

Clitae may refer to:

- Clitae (Bithynia), a town in the north of ancient Anatolia
- Clitae (Macedonia), a town of ancient Macedonia, Greece
- Clitae (tribe), a tribe of ancient Cilicia, in the south of ancient Anatolia
