= Macrones =

Ancient Colchian tribe in Pontus

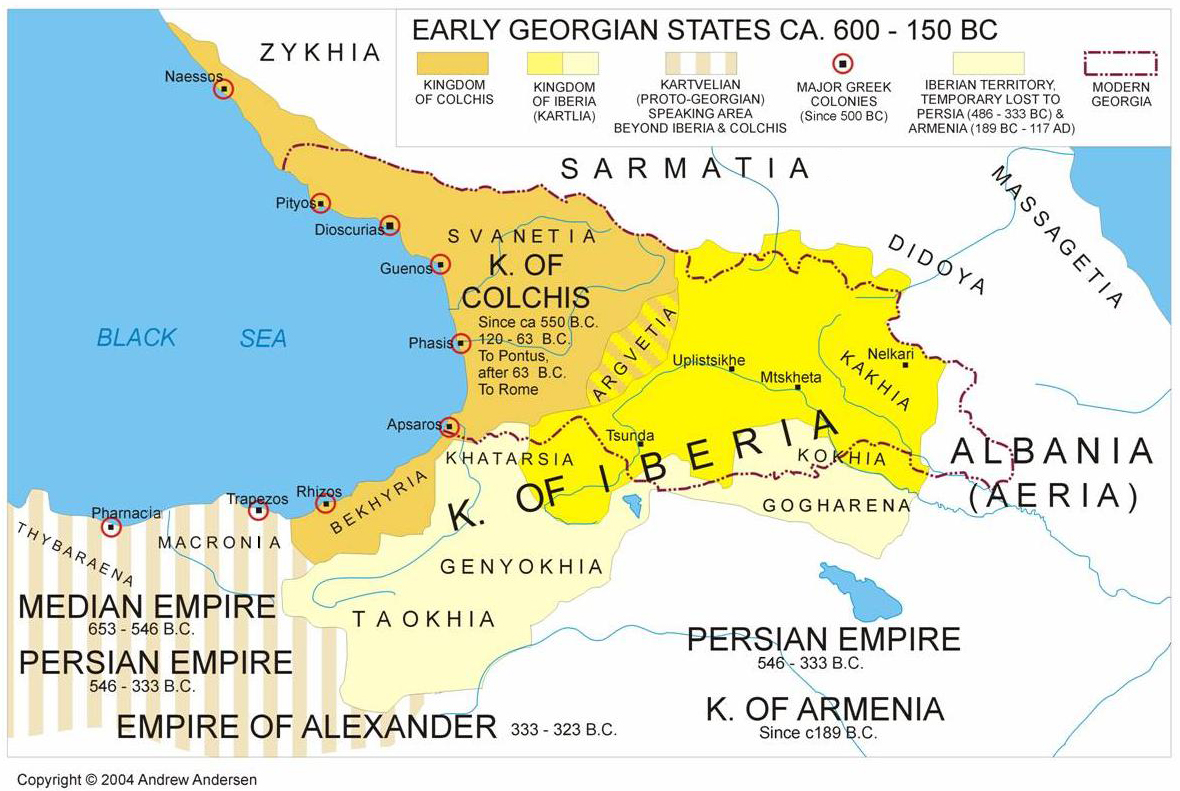
Macrones, occupying area around Trapezos marked as Macronia, next to Tibareni (Thybaraena)

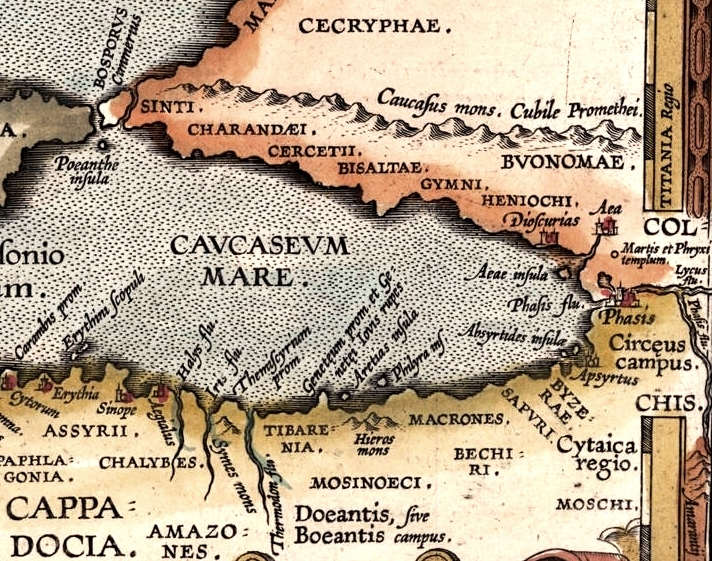
Macrones in a map of the voyage of the Argonauts by Abraham Ortelius, 1624

The Macrones (Georgian: მაკრონები, mak'ronebi; Ancient Greek: Μάκρωνες, Makrōnes) were an ancient Colchian tribe in the east of Pontus, about the Moschian Mountains (mountains approximately south and east of modern Bayburt). The name is allegedly derived from the name of Kromni valley (Κορούμ, located 13 km (8.1 mi) north-east of Gümüşhane) by adding Kartvelian ma- prefix which denotes regional descendant.

== History ==
The Macrones are first mentioned by Herodotus (c. 450 BC), who relates that they, along with Moschi, Tibareni, Mossynoeci, and Marres, formed the nineteenth satrapy within the Achaemenid Persian Empire and fought under Xerxes I. There are many other subsequent references to them in the Classical accounts. Xenophon (430–355 BC) places them east of Trapezus (modern Trabzon, Turkey). They are described as a powerful and wild people wearing garments made of hair, and as using in war wooden helmets, small shields of wicker-work, and short lances with long points. Strabo (xii.3.18) remarks, in passing, that the people formerly called Macrones bore in his day the name of Sanni, a claim supported also by Stephanus of Byzantium, though Pliny speaks of the Sanni and Macrones as two distinct peoples. By the 6th century they were known as the Tzanni (Ancient Greek: Τζάννοι). According to Procopius, the Byzantine emperor Justinian I subdued them in the 520s and converted them to Christianity. They participated in the Lazic War fighting under the Byzantine command.

The Macrones are identified by modern scholars as one of the proto-Georgian tribes whose presence in Northeastern Anatolia might have preceded the Hittite period, and who survived the demise of Urartu. They are frequently regarded as the possible ancestors of the Mingrelians and Laz people (cf. margal, a Mingrelian self-designation).

The Macrones lived along the border with the Machelonoi, another "Sannic" tribe evidently closely related to the Macrones.
