= Machelones =

Ancient Colchian tribe in western Georgia

მახელონები

Regions with significant populations
- Colchis

Related ethnic groups
- Macrones

The Machelones (Georgian: მახელონები) (Machelônes, Machelonoi; Greek: Μαχελῶνες) were a Colchian tribe located to the far south of the Phasis (modern-day Rioni River, western Georgia). There are several references to them in Classical sources. This group may be the Machorones of Pliny (NH 6.4.11) who placed them between the Ophis (modern Of, Turkey) and Prytanis rivers.

The 1st century AD writer Lucian also comments about the Machlyai and their ruler, but the account seems to be entirely fictional. Ptolemy, in the early 2nd century AD, mentions the town of Mechlessos on the border of Colchis, but adds nothing substantive. His contemporary author, Arrian, lists on a west to east orientation the Sannoi, Drilae, Machelonoi, Heniochoi, Zudreitai, and Lazoi (Perip. 1 1.1-2). Writing in the early 3rd century about an event a hundred years earlier (AD 117), Dio Cassius (68.19) relates that the Machelonoi and the neighboring Heniochoi were ruled by a single "king", Anchialos, who submitted to the Roman emperor Trajan. There is a special mention in the anonymous (probably post-4th century) Periplus Ponti Evcines that both the Machelones and Heniochoi were once called Ekcheireis. The country called Machelonia, a client state of the Sassanid Persian Empire, figures in the so-called Res Gestae Divi Saporis (Ka'ba-i Zartosht), the mid-3rd-century AD trilingual inscription concerning the political, military, and religious activities of Shapur I, and appears, in this case, to be synonymous to Colchis.

The Machelones were closely related ethnically to the neighboring Macrones (a tribe believed to be the ancestors of present-day Mingrelians, a subethnic group of the Georgian people), known since at least the 5th century BC.
