= Zydretae =

Ancient people of Colchis

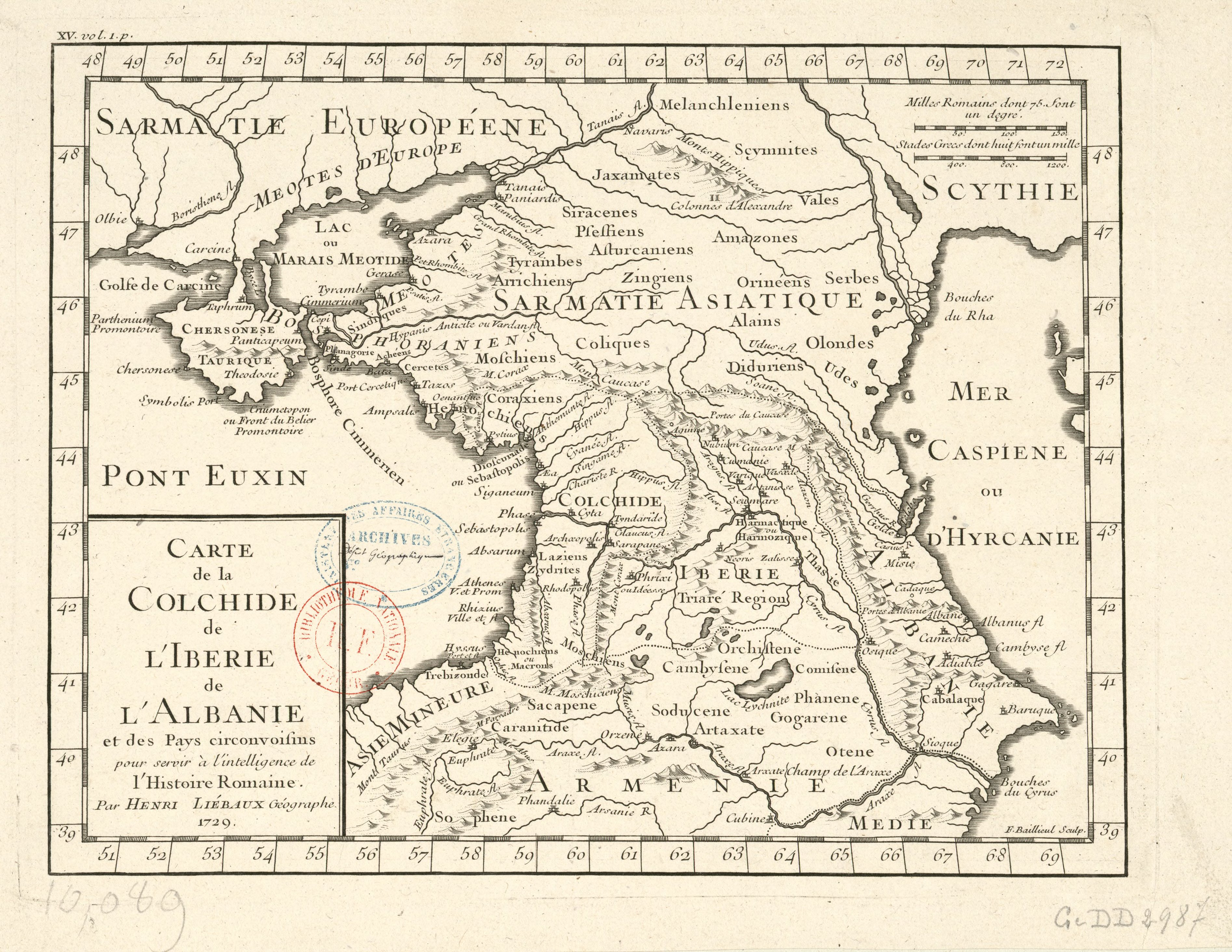
Zydrites in a map of Colchis, Caucasian Iberia and Caucasian Albania by Henri Liébaux, 1729

The Zydretae (Georgian: ზიდრიტები) (Zudrêtai or Zudreitai) were an ancient people of Colchis recorded by the Classical accounts as dwelling on the coast of the Pontus Euxinus (Black Sea), on the southern side of the Apsarus river (modern-day Çoruh/Chorokhi in the borderlands of Turkey and Georgia), and between the Machelonoi and the Lazi tribes. The early 2nd century Roman author Arrian lists several neighboring and probably ethnically related tribes on a west to east orientation: the Sannoi (Sanigs), Drilae, Machelonoi, Heniochoi, Zudreitai, and Lazoi (Perip. 1 1.1-2). The anonymous (probably post-4th century) Periplus Ponti Euxini places them further south between the Akamosis and Archabis rivers. Little is known about the Zydretae's social and political life, but at that time when Arrian described them (c. 130s AD), they seem to have been subjected to the king of Iberia Pharasmanes II in eastern Georgia.
