= Odzrkhe =

- ოძრხე ოძრახე (Georgian)
- Odzrakhe
- Location within Samtskhe-Javakheti Location within Georgia
- 41°45′9″N 42°49′55″E
- Location: Georgia
- Region: Samtskhe-Javakheti

Site notes
- Condition: ruins

Odzrkhe or Odzrakhe (Georgian: ოძრხე or ოძრახე) was a historic fortified town and the surrounding area in what is now Abastumani, Adigeni Municipality in Samtskhe-Javakheti region, southern Georgia.

== History ==
According to medieval Georgian historic tradition, it was founded by the mythic hero Odzrakhos of the Kartlosid line. The ruins of old fortifications are still visible around the site. Odzrkhe or Odzrakhe considered to be the old name of Samtskhe or Meskheti.

== See also ==
- Byzeres
