= Mares (tribe) =

Ancient Colchian tribe

The Mares were an ancient Colchian tribe. They entered ancient history with the writings of Hecataeus of Miletus. He gives a brief description of the tribe and mentions that they lived between closely akin Colchian tribal groups Macrones and Mossynoeci. They inhabited the southeast periphery of the Black Sea, more precisely the mountains of Northeast Anatolia.According to Herodotus, they had the same leader as the Colchians, who were the larger entity created through a process of political consolidation and amalgamation of tribes. After the rapid rise of Achaemenid Empire, they were incorporated into the XIX Satrapy, along with other Colchian tribes Mushki, Tibareni, Macrones and Mossynoeci.

== See also ==
- Mares and Maris
