= Leucosyri =

Historical group

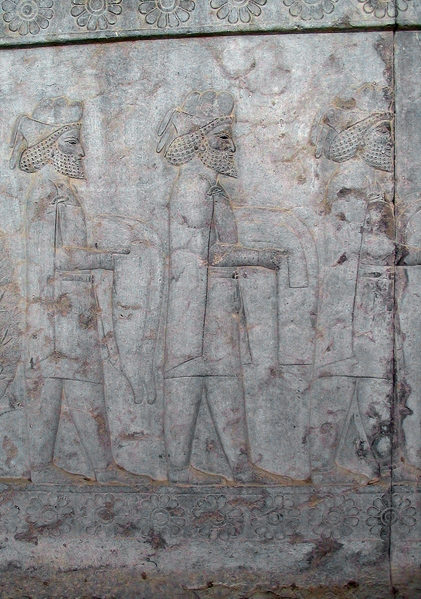
Cappadocian Tributaries East Staircase of Apadana, commissioned by Darius the Great c. 520 BCE–486 BCE.

The Leuco-Syrians or literally White Syrians (Ancient Greek: Λευκόσυροι, romanized: Leucosyri or Ancient Greek: Λευκοσύριοι, romanized: Leucosyroi), also known as Syrians (Ancient Greek: Σύριος, romanized: Syrios or Ancient Greek: Ἀσσυρία, romanized: Assyria), and Cappadocians (Ancient Greek: Καππάδοκας, romanized: Kappadokas) were an ancient people in central Anatolia during the period of Classical Antiquity. Whether the White Syrians were a Semitic or Indo-European people, or neither, is unknown.

== Name ==
Leuco-Syroi translates literally to "White-Syrians". Strabo suggested this distinction was made by the Greeks to distinguish the Syrians of Anatolia from those of Mesopotamia (Assyrians) and the Levant (Syrians).

The etymology of the term Syrian in this context is unknown, but seems unrelated to either the Syrians of the Levant or the Assyrians of Mesopotamia, and is likely derived from a native Anatolian term. The earliest appearance of this term is theorized to have been the Sura mentioned in inscriptions from Carchemish. Although this connection is unconfirmed.

The alternate term Cappadocian is described by Strabo as the Persian word for the White Syrians. Cappadocia (Ancient Greek: Καππαδοκία) is derived from Old Persian: 𐎣𐎫𐎱𐎬𐎢𐎣, romanized: Katpatuka, itself likely from Hittite: 𒅗𒋫𒁉𒁕, romanized: kata-peda, lit. 'place below'.

== Language ==
The White Syrians likely spoke the Ancient Cappadocian language, an Anatolian language related to Luwian and Hittite. It is possible that remnants of this language survive in the vocabulary of the modern Cappadocian Greek dialect.

== Location ==
According to Greek historiographers and geographers, the White Syrians lived in the Pontus region on the eastern side of the Halys River, in between the Paphlagonians and Chalybes. They also lived in the regions of Cappadocia, Cilicia, and other inland regions of Asia Minor between the modern city of Ankara and the Armenian highlands, and between the Black Sea and the Aintab Plateau.

== History ==
After the collapse of the Hittite Empire, the descendants of the Hittites were ruled by various conquering peoples throughout the following centuries. Those south of the Halys River eventually established the various city-states and kingdoms of the Tabal region. For those north of the Halys, their history is mostly unknown until the 5th Century BC.

According to Herodotus, the White Syrians were subjugated by the Medes, and then by the Persians under Cyrus. Under the Persians, the White Syrians were grouped into the 3rd taxation district along with the Phrygians, Bithynians, Paphlagonians and Mariandynians.

During the Mithridatic Wars, the Leucosyrians were recruited as mercenaries into the Pontic army to fight off the Roman army of Sulla and later Pompey.

== See also ==
- Cappadocia
- Anatolia
- Pontus (region)
- Syria (region)
- Names of Syria

== Sources ==
- Roller, Duane W., ed. (2014). The Geography of Strabo: An English Translation, with Introduction and Notes. Cambridge: Cambridge University Press. ISBN 9781139952491.
- Dan, Anca (2012). "Les Leukosyriens: Quelques notes d'ethnographie sinopéenne". Sinope: The Results of Fifteen Years of Research. Leiden-Boston: Brill. pp. 73–102. ISBN 9789004223882.
- Simon, Zsolt (2013a). "Where is the Land of Sura of the Hieroglyphic Luwian Inscription KARKAMIŠ A4b and Why Were Cappadocians Called Syrians by Greeks?". Altorientalische Forschungen [Ancient Near Eastern Research]. 39 (1). Walter de Gruyter: 167–180. doi:10.1524/aofo.2012.0011.
- Weeden, Mark (2017). "Tabal and the Limits of Assyrian Imperialism". In Heffron, Yağmur; Stone, Adam; Worthington, Martin (eds.). At the Dawn of History: Ancient Near Eastern Studies in Honour of J. N. Postgate. Vol. 2. Winona, United States: Eisenbrauns. pp. 721–736. ISBN 978-1-57506-471-0.
