= Clitae (Bithynia) =

Ancient town of Bithynia

Clitae or Kleitai (Ancient Greek: Κλειταί) was a town in the interior of Bithynia (or Paphlagonia), mentioned by Ptolemy. It lay east of the Parthenius River.

The site of Clitae is unknown.
