= Homana =

Town of ancient Pisidia

Coordinates: 37°14′53″N 32°01′40″E

Homana, also known as Homona and Homonanda, was a town of ancient Pisidia and later of Isauria and Lycaonia, inhabited in Hellenistic and Roman times. Pliny the Elder puts the town in Pisidia. It appears in the Synecdemus as part of Lycaonia under the name Umanada or Oumanada (Ancient Greek: Οὐμανάδα). It was the capital of the Homanadeis (Ὁμαναδεῖς), who, besides Homana, are said by Tacitus to have possessed 44 forts, a statement opposed to the remarks of Strabo, according to which the Homanades, the most barbarous of all Pisidian tribes, dwelt on the northern slope of the highest mountains without any towns or villages, living only in caves. In the reign of Augustus, the consul Quirinius compelled this little tribe, by famine, to surrender, and distributed 4000 of them as colonists among the neighbouring towns. It became a bishopric; no longer the seat of a residential bishop, it remains, under the name of Homona, a titular see of the Catholic Church.

Its site is located southwest of Lake Trogitis, Seydişehir, Konya Province, Turkey.

== Relevant literature ==
- Ramsay, W. M. "Studies in the Roman Province Galatia: I. The Homanadeis and the Homanadensian War." The Journal of Roman Studies 7 (1917): 229-283.
