= Kaukauni =

Cauconians or Kaukani or Cauconiatae is the name of an ancient tribe in Anatolia mentioned by Strabo. By his time he writes that they were extinct.
