= Chalybes =

Race of iron-workers in Greek mythology

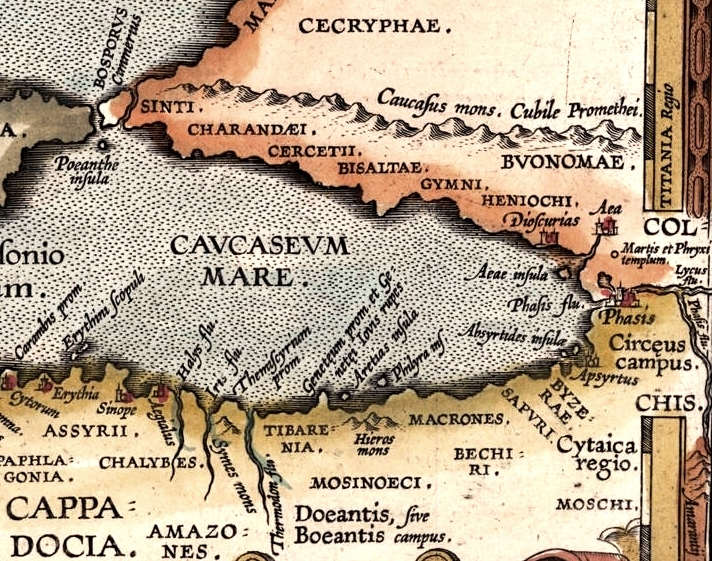
Chalybes in a map of the voyage of the Argonauts by Abraham Ortelius, 1624

The Chalybes (/ˈkælɪbiːz/; Ancient Greek: Χάλυβες/Χάλυβοι; Georgian: ხალიბები) and Chaldoi (Ancient Greek: Χάλδοι; Armenian: Խաղտիք, romanized: Xałtik') were peoples mentioned by classical authors as living in Pontus and Cappadocia in northern Anatolia during Classical Antiquity. Their territory was known as Chaldia, extending from the Halys River to Pharnakeia and Trabzon in the east and as far south as eastern Anatolia. According to Apollonius of Rhodes, the Chalybes were Scythians.

== Background and history ==
The Chaldoi, Chalybes, Mossynoikoi, and Tibareni, are counted among the first ironsmith nations by classical authors. Χάλυψ, the tribe's name in Ancient Greek, means "tempered iron, steel", a term that passed into Latin as chalybs, "steel". Sayce derived the Greek name Chalybe from Hittite Khaly-wa, "land of Halys River". More than an identifiable people or tribe, "Chalybes" was a generic Greek term for "peoples of the Black Sea coast who trade in iron" or "a group of specialised metalworkers".

The main sources for the history of the Chaldoi are accounts from classical authors, including Homer, Strabo, and Xenophon. Xenophon encountered them during the march of the Ten Thousand to the Black Sea and describes them in his Anabasis as "the most valiant of all the peoples [the Ten Thousand] passed through, and would come to hand-to-hand encounter." He reports that they dwelt in strongholds. In Xenophon's Cyropaedia, Cyrus the Great helps the Armenians and Chaldians resolve a dispute over agricultural land.

In Roman times, the Chaldaei (homonymous but unrelated to the Semitic Chaldeans) and Chalybes are mentioned by Plutarch (Lucull. c. 14) as settled in Pontus and Cappadocia, or the Pontus Cappadocicus section of the Roman province of Pontus.

Pliny the Elder mentioned the Armenochalybes, a tribe residing between Trebizond and Armenia.

Despite the ancient Greeks connecting the Chalybes to Scythians, some modern historians argue the Chalybes were a Georgian tribe. Historian Kalistrat Salia claims the Georgian ethnicity of the Chalybes is "indisputable". According to Sallia, the Zans, a Kartvelian ethnic group from present-day Turkey, are their descendants. According to the 7th-century Geography of Armenia, the Chaldians called the Black Sea Kakamar, which may have an Indo-European etymology (the Greek root kak- 'ill' + mar, the Indo-European root for 'sea').

== See also ==
- Halizones

== Bibliography ==
- Kavtaradze, Giorgi Leon (1996). "Probleme der historischen Geographie Anatoliens und Transkaukasiens im ersten Jahrtausend v. Chr". Orbis Terrarum (in German). 2: 191–216.
- Lang, David Marshall (1966). The Georgians. Ancient Peoples and Places. London: Thames and Hudson. pp. 50, 66, 75. ISBN 9780500020494. OCLC 956752.
