= Byzeres =

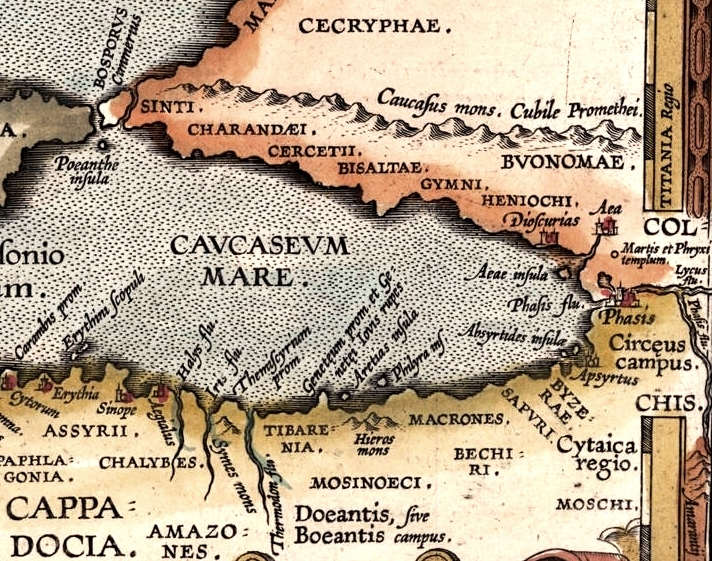
Byzerae in a map of the voyage of the Argonauts by Abraham Ortelius, 1624

The Byzeres (Ancient Greek: Βύζηρες) were a people of the Southern Caucasus mentioned in Urartean sources as Uiterukhi or Uitirukhi. Sardur II conquered their lands, appointed a deputy and made it a province. According to the Ancient Greek sources, Byzeres inhabited near the southeast coast of the Black Sea, south of the Ch'orokhi River and partly the Pontic Mountains as well. The name of the historical region Odzrkhe is derived from the name of this tribe – Vidzerukh/Viterukh/Odzr(a)khe/Odzrkhe.

The Georgian Soviet encyclopedia identifies the Byzeres (Georgian: ბიძერები bidzerebi) as "an ancient Georgian [Kartvelian] tribe"

== See also ==
- Odzrkhe
