= Zans =

Subethnic group of Kartvelian people

The Zans (Georgian: ზანები, romanized: zanebi) or Chans (Georgian: ჭანები, romanized: ch'anebi) are a subethnic group of the Kartvelian people, speaking the Zan languages.

- Kartvelian peoples
  - Karts
  - Zans (Mingrelians and Laz people)
  - Svans

== See also ==
- Kartvelian languages
- Zan languages
