= Clitae (tribe) =

Cilician tribe

The Clitae were a Cilician tribe who are mentioned by Tacitus as subjects of a Cappadocian Archelaus, in the time of Tiberius. This Archelaus appears to have been a king of Cilicia Trachea, certainly not the last king of Cappadocia, Archelaus of Cappadocia, for he was dead before the time to which Tacitus refers in the passage cited above. The Clitae refused to submit to the regulations of the Roman-style census, and to pay taxes, and retired to the heights of the Taurus Mountains. There they successfully resisted the king, until M. Trebellius was sent by Vitellius, the governor of Syria, who blockaded them in their hill forts, Cadra and Davara, and compelled them to surrender. In the reign of Claudius the Clitae again fortified themselves on the mountains, under a leader Trosobores, whence they descended to the coast and the towns, plundering the cultivators, townspeople, shipmasters, and merchants. They besieged the town of Anemurium, a place probably near the promontory, from which and the other circumstances we collect that the Clitae were a nation in Cilicia Trachea. At last Antiochus IV of Commagene, who was king of this coast, by pleasing the common sort and cajoling the leader, succeeded in putting Trosobores and a few of the chiefs to death, and pacified the rest by his mild measures.
