= Drilae =

Drilae (Georgian: დრილები, Drilebi) were an ancient western Georgian tribe, inhabiting mountainous coasts of the southern shores of the Black Sea. In the hinterland of Trapezus dwelt the Drilae (Dri/lai, Dri/llai), a Kartvelian tribe which was chronically at war with the Trapezuntians. In 401 BC their territory were invaded by Greek mercenaries, which is attested in Anabasis - the work of ancient Greek soldier and historian Xenophon. Xenophon records that they were most warlike of the pontic tribes and inhabited mountainous and inaccessible land. He also notes that their capital was so well fortified that even experienced Greek soldiers were unable to take it.

Drillae were mainly pastoralists, but they were skilled in construction as well. The country of the Drilae was “mountainous and difficult to traverse and its inhabitants the most warlike of all that dwell upon the Euxine” (Xenophon, Anabasis, V.ii.2-27). Arrian (2nd century A.D.) claims that Xenophon’s Drilae still existed in his day but were known as “Sanni.” He states that “these too are very warlike, even to this day, and are hostile to the Trapezuntines, live in fortified places, and are a tribe without a king. They were also formerly liable for tribute to the Romans, although, being pirates, they are not anxious to pay their tribute” (Periplus 11.1-2).
