= Mossynoeci =

Tribe of ancient Anatolia

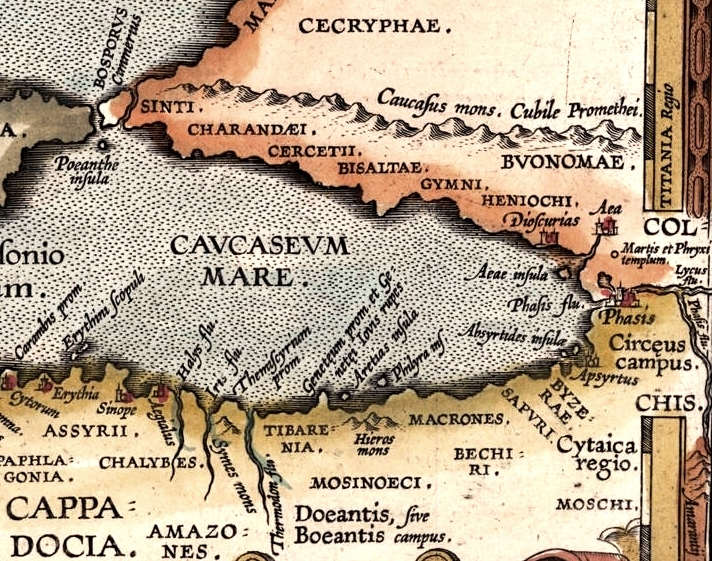
Mosinoeci (lower centre) in a map of the voyage of the Argonauts by Abraham Ortelius, 1624

Mossynoeci (Georgian: მოსინიკები, Ancient Greek: Μοσσύνοικοι, Mossünoikoi, modern Greek Mossyniki, "dwellers in wooden towers") is a name that the Greeks of the Euxine Sea (Black Sea) applied to the peoples of Pontus, the northern Anatolian coast west of Trebizond. The Mossynoeci were believed to be of proto-Georgian origin.

== Herodotus ==
Writing soon after 430 BCE, Herodotus in Book 3 cites the Mossynoeci, along with the Moschoi, Tibareni, the Macrones and Marres as comprising the 19th satrapy established by Darius of Persia. The satrapy as a whole was to yield three hundred talents. The Mossynoeci are also mentioned in Book 7 of the Histories.

== Xenophon ==
In his Anabasis Xenophon describes the Mossynoeci at some length (5.4). According to his account, the Greeks spent eight days (5.5.1) in their territory, probably in the summer of 400, on their way west along the Black Sea coast from Trapezus. The author reports that those who returned home used to say the Mossynoeci 'were the most barbarous people they passed through and the furthest removed from Greek customs' (5.4.27). The Mossynoeci seemed to favour outdoor sex (5.4.34) and may have practised 'whistled speech' (5.4.31), a form of communication still found in the region today together with just a handful of other places in the world.

== Jason and the Argonauts ==
The Mossynoeci are mentioned in Apollonius of Rhodes's (third century BCE in Alexandria) epic poem The Voyage of Argo. In Book 2: Onward to Colchis, he writes, "These people have their own ideas of what is right and proper. What we do as a rule openly in town or market-place they do at home; and what we do in the privacy of our houses they do out of doors in the open street, and nobody thinks the worst of them. Even the sexual act puts no one to blush in this community. On the contrary, like swine in the fields, they lie down on the ground in promiscuous intercourse and are not at all disconcerted by the presence of others. Then again, their king sits in loftiest hut of all to dispense justice to his numerous subjects. But if the poor man happens to make a mistake in his findings, they lock him up and give him nothing to eat for the rest of the day."

== Other ==
It is possible that the town Mossyna was named for them.

== See also ==
- Meskheti
- Moschi
- Meshech
