= Sanni =

The Sanni (Georgian: სანები) are mentioned by Strabo (1st century BC/1st century AD), Pliny the Elder (1st century AD) and Arrian (2nd century AD) as a people settling near Trebizond (in today's Turkish Black Sea Region). In the 1st and 2nd centuries AD, their territory extended to the north-east until the river Ophis, and covered both the littoral and the mountainous hinterland. Pliny grouped together the Sanni who lived in the region of Trebizond and the Heniochi as one single nation. He also mentions other Sanni, living further on the Colchis littoral, past the mouth of the Rioni.

According to Theodoret of Cyrrus (5th century AD), the Sanni and Lazi were two different tribes. In the first centuries AD, Sanni people living in the region of Trebizond were paying tribute to the Roman Empire. However, they tried to avoid heavy direct taxation and later left the coastal areas for the mountains. In the 6th century, Procopius still mentions them as living near the source of the Boasi (today the Chorokhi, or Çoruh River).

There have been various interpretations of the ethnonym in Georgian literature; some scholars, such as Simon Kaukhchishvili, suggest that it is related to the name "chan" or its variants, long present in Greek mythological narratives about Colchis; others, among them Arnold Chikobava, see it as derived from the name still given to Mingrelian people in the Svan language Zan (see also Zan language). In the opinion of S. Dzhanashia, San was indeed an endonym of ancient Colchians, which later evolved into the forms Zan in the north of Colchis (Mingrelia) and Chan in the southern part (which would become Lazistan). The form Τζάνοι (Chani) can be found in Byzantine authors such as Procopius, but Sanni can be found as recently as the 12th century. Today, Chani is still used as an ethnonym for the Laz people.
