= Tibareni =

Ancient ethnic group in modern Turkey

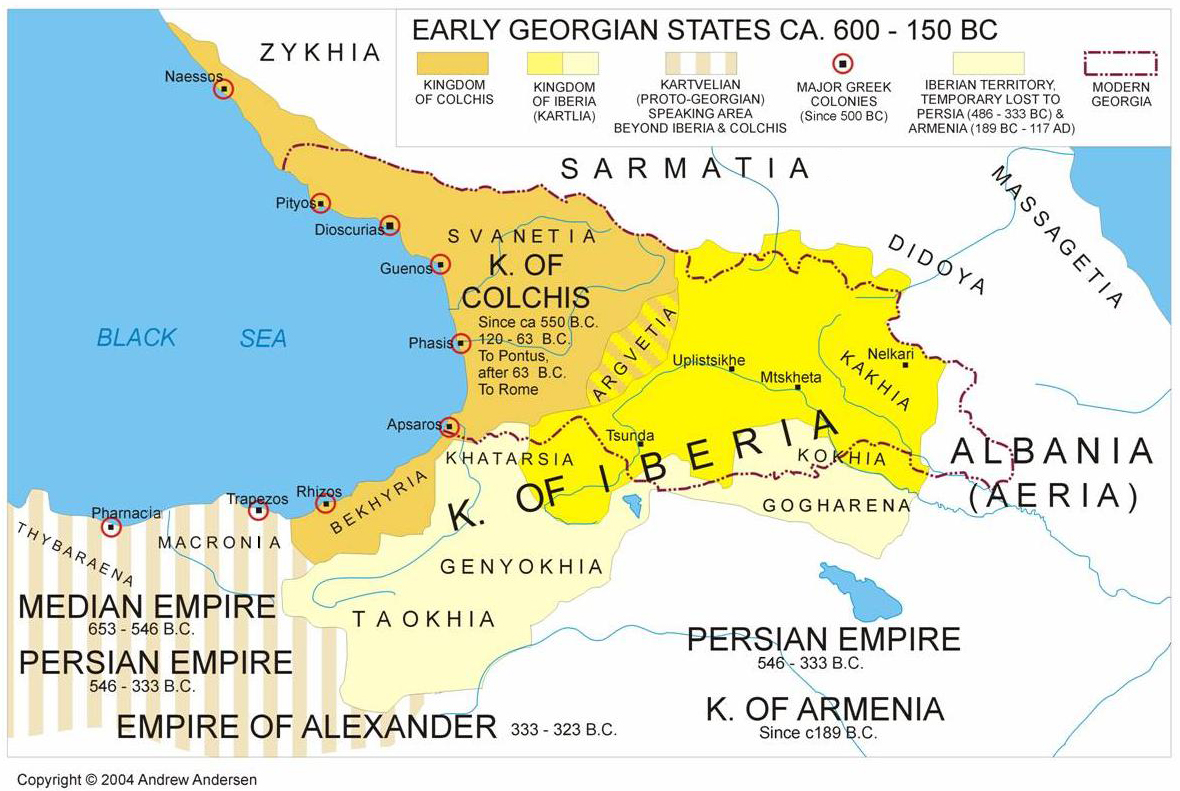
Tibareni occupied the country between the Chalybes and the Mosynoeci, on the east of the river Iris.

The Tibareni (Greek: Τιβαρηνοί, Τιβαρανοί) were a people residing on the coast of ancient Pontus referred to in Herodotus, Xenophon, Strabo and other classical authors. The Tibareni were believed to be of Scythian origin, but modern scholars generally identify them as proto-Kartvelian. Tabalians are often thought to represent the same ethnic group.

== Description ==
Tibareni occupied the country between the Chalybes and the Mosynoeci, on the east of the river Iris, and the country was called Tibarenia (Ancient Greek: Τιβαρηνία). They are mentioned as early as the time of Herodotus. According to the ancient Greeks, the Tibareni were Scythians. Strabo describes them as inhabiting the mountains branching off from the Montes Moschici and Colchici, and mentions Cotyura as their principal town. They appear to have been a harmless and happy people, who performed all their duties in a joyous manner. Their arms consisted of wooden helmets, small shields, and short spears with long points. Xenophon and his Greeks spent three days in travelling through their country.

All three tribes — Tibareni, Chalybes and Mosynoeci — still neighbored each other, along the Black Sea coast of Anatolia (ancient Pontus), as late as in Roman times. Tibareni, along with the neighbouring tribes, were subjugated by the Achaemenid Empire in the 6th-5th centuries BC and were incorporated into the 19th satrapy.

== See also ==
- Chalybes, Mossynoeci, Moschi, Macrones
- Tabalians

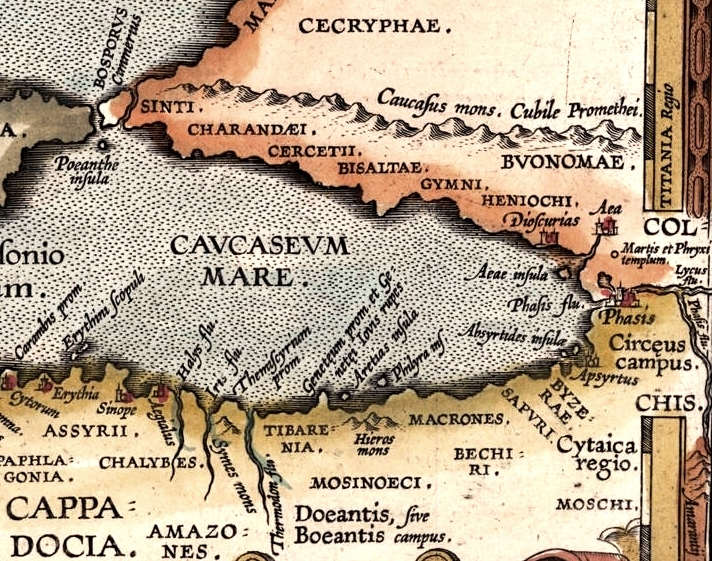
Tibarenia in a map of the voyage of the Argonauts by Abraham Ortelius, 1624
