= Heniochi =

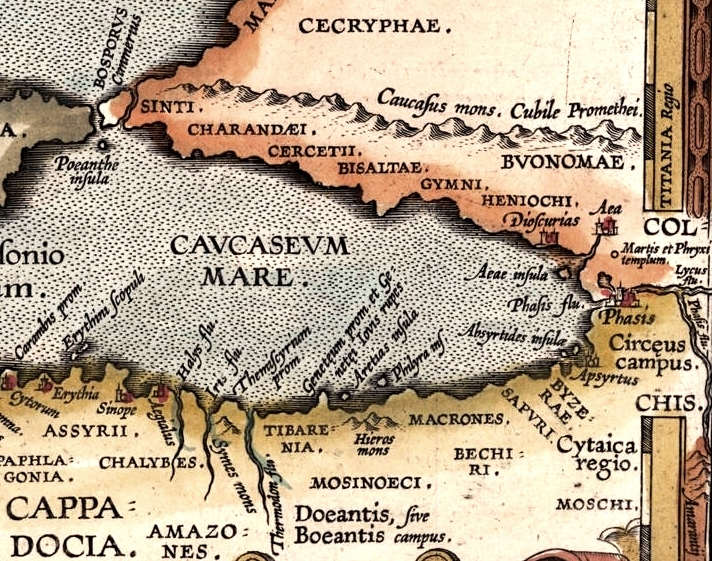
Heniochi in a map of the voyage of the Argonauts by Abraham Ortelius, 1624

The Heniochi (Greek: Ἡνίοχοι, Heníochoi "charioteers") were an ancient tribe inhabiting northwest shores of Colchis (present-day Abkhazia, (Note: The political status of Abkhazia is disputed. Having unilaterally declared independence from Georgia in 1992, Abkhazia is formally recognised as an independent state by 5 UN member states (two other states previously recognised it but then withdrew their recognition), while the remainder of the international community recognizes it as de jure Georgian territory. Georgia continues to claim the area as its own territory, designating it as Russian-occupied territory.) northwestern Georgia) and some say Phasis area. Their country was called Heniocheia (Ancient Greek: Ἡνιοχεία).

They are attested by a number of ancient historians and others alike, namely: Aristotle, Artemidorus Ephesius, Ovid, Pliny the Elder, Arrian, Strabo and others. It is pointed out that they lived in a quite wide area from Dioscurias (Διοσκουριάς), to Trabzon.

Sources from the 5th to 4th century BC till the 1st century AD note the Heniokhs lived from modern Sochi till Pitiunt - Dioskourias. It is difficult to identify with certainty the relationship between the tribes mentioned by classical authors and the contemporary ethnic groups. Various scholars relate the tribe to modern day Georgians (specifically Zans and Svans).

The tribe of Heniochs according to Artemidorus of Ephesus, occupied in the 5th - 1st cc. B.C, the Black Sea littoral that is part of present-day Abkhazia: - from the environs of Pitiunt or Pityus to the river Achaeuntus (the Shakhe river near present-day Tuapse). Aristotle describes the Heniochi (along with the Acaei) as a group of people "ready enough to kill and eat men."
