= Laz people in Germany =

Total population
- 2,000

Languages
- Laz, Turkish, German, Georgian

Religion
- Islam

There are about 1,000 Laz people—a Kartvelian-speaking ethnic group indigenous to the Black Sea coast—in Germany (German: Lasen in Deutschland, Laz: ლაზეფე ჯერმანჲაშე Lazepe Cermanyaşe) refers to coastal regions of Turkey and Georgia.

== History ==
The earliest recorded Laz immigrants had come to Germany from Turkey in the 1970s, as a result of a labour recruitment agreement signed between West Germany and Republic of Turkey. Lazs in Germany are mostly Turkish nationals or naturalized citizens, however within the last decade more and more intellectual Laz people realized that the disappearance of their language would lead to the disappearance of their identity and tried to preserve their inherited culture through political empowerment, linguistic education, and music and poetry.

Lazs in Germany could be said to have pioneered the Laz language movement. The Lazuri Alboni (Laz Alphabet) based on the Latin alphabet was developed by Fahri Lazoğlu and Wolfgang Feurstein in Germany in 1984. Lazebura, which is the name of a magazine and now a website, published this alphabet for Laz people who live in Germany. Currently, the written language has two alphabets: the Mkhedruli (Georgian) alphabet for Laz community who inhabit in Georgia, and the Latin alphabet for Laz community who inhabit Turkey.

In 2013, the Laz Institute was established in Istanbul to support the preservation and development of the Laz language and culture. The institute prepared a Laz-language curriculum that was approved by the Turkish Ministry of National Education in 2013, enabling Laz to be taught as an elective course in secondary schools. It subsequently prepared Laz-language textbooks and organised teacher-training programmes in cooperation with the Ministry.
