= Laz people in Georgia =

Laz people in Georgia ლაზები საქართველოში Lazepe Okorturas ლაზეფე ოქორთურას
- Part of historical Lazeti in modern international borders of Georgia.

Total population
- 2,000

Regions with significant populations
- Adjara, Abkhazia, Mingrelia, Tbilisi

Languages
- Laz, Georgian

Religion
- Islam 99% and Georgian Orthodoxy 1%

The Laz people in Georgia (Georgian: ლაზები საქართველოში, Lazebi Sakartveloshi; Laz: ლაზეფე ოქორთურას, Lazepe Okorturas) refers to an indigenous Kartvelian-speaking ethnic group inhabiting the Black Sea coastal regions of Turkey and Georgia. There are about 2,000 Laz in Georgia, mainly in Sarpi, Kvariati and Gonio villages and Batumi. Laz identity in Georgia has largely merged with a Georgian identity, and the meaning of "Laz" is seen as merely a regional category. Kolkhoba is an annual Laz festival held each year at the end of August or the beginning of September in Sarpi, a village in Georgia. Sopho Khalvashi was a first Georgian musician of Laz heritage who represented her home nation at the Eurovision Song Contest 2007.

== Abkhazia ==
Today, the Laz people in Abkhazia have largely assimilated into Abkhaz society. Today, except for some members of the older generation who still speak Laz and feel Laz, the Laz people in the region are culturally and linguistically separate.

== Mingrelia ==
In Samegrelo and Zemo Svaneti region there are some Laz families in Anaklia village of Zugdidi Municipality and few in Poti city, where they highly assimilated with local Mingrelians.
