= Tsiskaridze =

Tsiskaridze (Georgian: ცისკარიძე) is a Georgian family name from the regions Adjara and Guria in South West Georgia. The Tsiskaridze surname can be found among others in the city of Batumi and the towns Kobuleti, Khelvachauri and Ozurgeti at or near the southern Black Sea coast of Georgia.

== Notable members ==
- Nikolay Tsiskaridze (born 1973), Russian ballet dancer
- Zourab Tsiskaridze (born 1986), Georgian footballer
