= Kolkhoba =

- Observed by: Sarpi, Georgia
- Type: Cultural, historical
- Significance: Celebration of regional history
- Date: Late summers

Kolkhoba (Georgian and Laz: კოლხობა) is an annual festival held each year at the end of August or the beginning of September in the southwestern part of Adjara, an autonomous republic of Georgia. Finding its roots in ancient folklore, the modern celebration of the festival dates back to 1978, at a time when Soviet authorities sought to encourage Laz nationalism.

While the origin of Kolkhoba is directly linked with the ancient Laz traditions linked with the Black Sea, the holiday has now become almost exclusively a commemoration of the myth of the Argonauts. While public festivals are organized by the Adjarian government, critics have pointed out in recent years that the celebration had lost its original focus on Laz folklore.

== Background ==
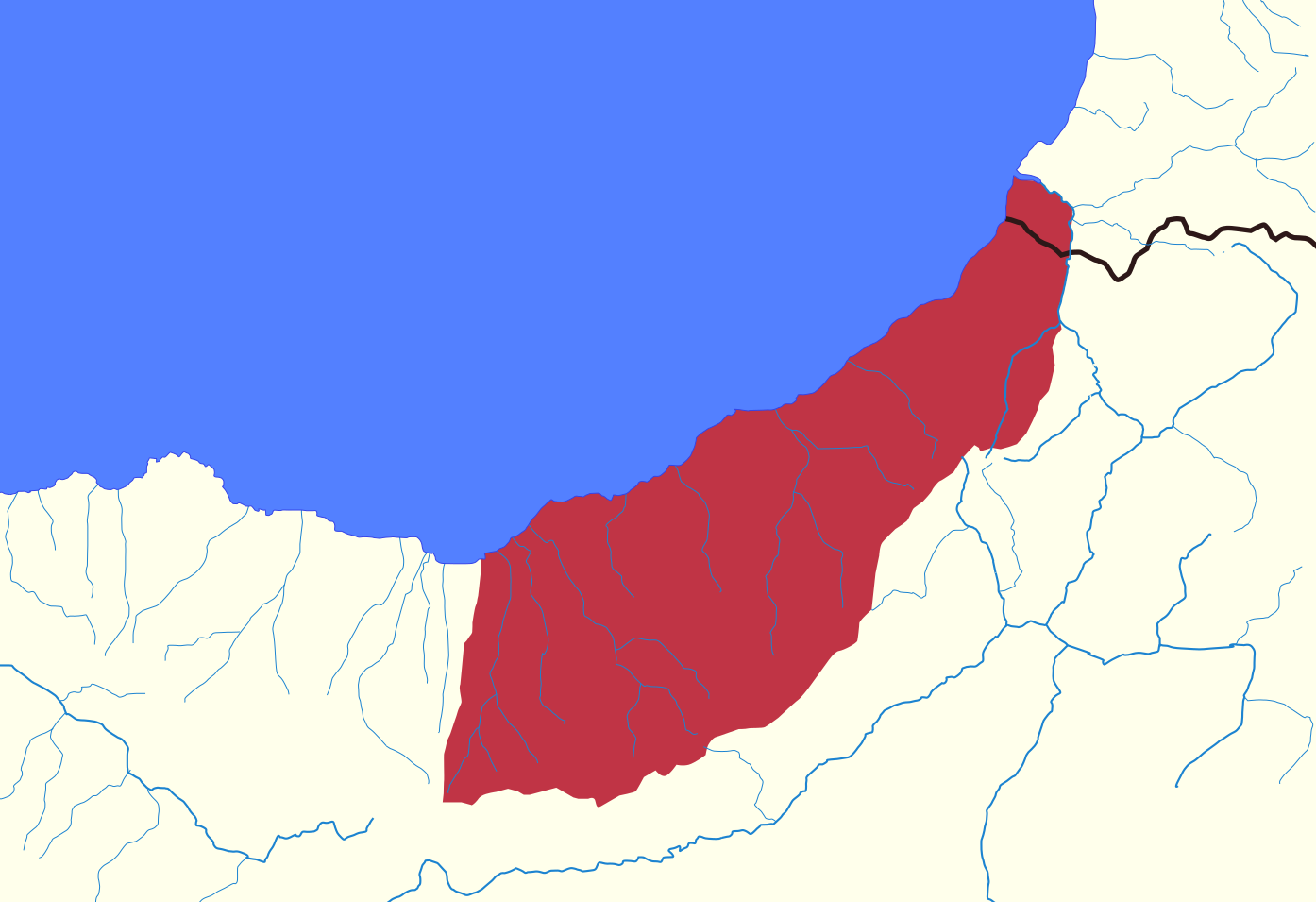
Map of Lazeti, covering both Georgian and Turkish territories.

The Kolkhoba festival finds its roots in a historical celebration held in Lazeti, a region in Western Georgia corresponding to the ancient Kingdom of Colchis. Etymologically, the name Kolkhoba is made from the root kolkh- (კოლხ-) indicating the Georgian name for Colchis ("Kolkheti" კოლხეთი) and the suffix -oba which is a sign of reference (similar to the English "-ness" suffix). The ancient celebration was related to folkloric beliefs related to the sea, namely the "bahuri" (sometimes known as "chereli"), a time in mid-summer traditionally believed to mark the end of the annual swimming season as it was believed that the alleged fresh and salt water meeting during that period made the waters more dangerous. These beliefs have been noted in historically Laz villages along the Black Sea shore, both in Georgia and Turkey.

According to 19th-century ethnologist Niko Mari, the main Kolkhoba celebrations took place since the medieval period on 7 August from the coast of Sarpi (modern-day Georgia) to Hopa (Turkey) and involved locals gathering on the shore and swimming. According to Laz researcher İsmail Bucaklişi, locals in the Turkish village of Fındıklı (mostly populated by ethnic Laz) mark the "bahuri" to this day by swimming on the first day of autumn before the sunrise.

It isn't clear when or why the original Kolkhoba celebrations disappeared, but causes may include the progressive depopulation of the region since the 17th century and the increased influence of Sunni Islam as Lazeti became an Ottoman marchland, in constant warfare with the Christian Kingdom of Imereti.

== Observance ==
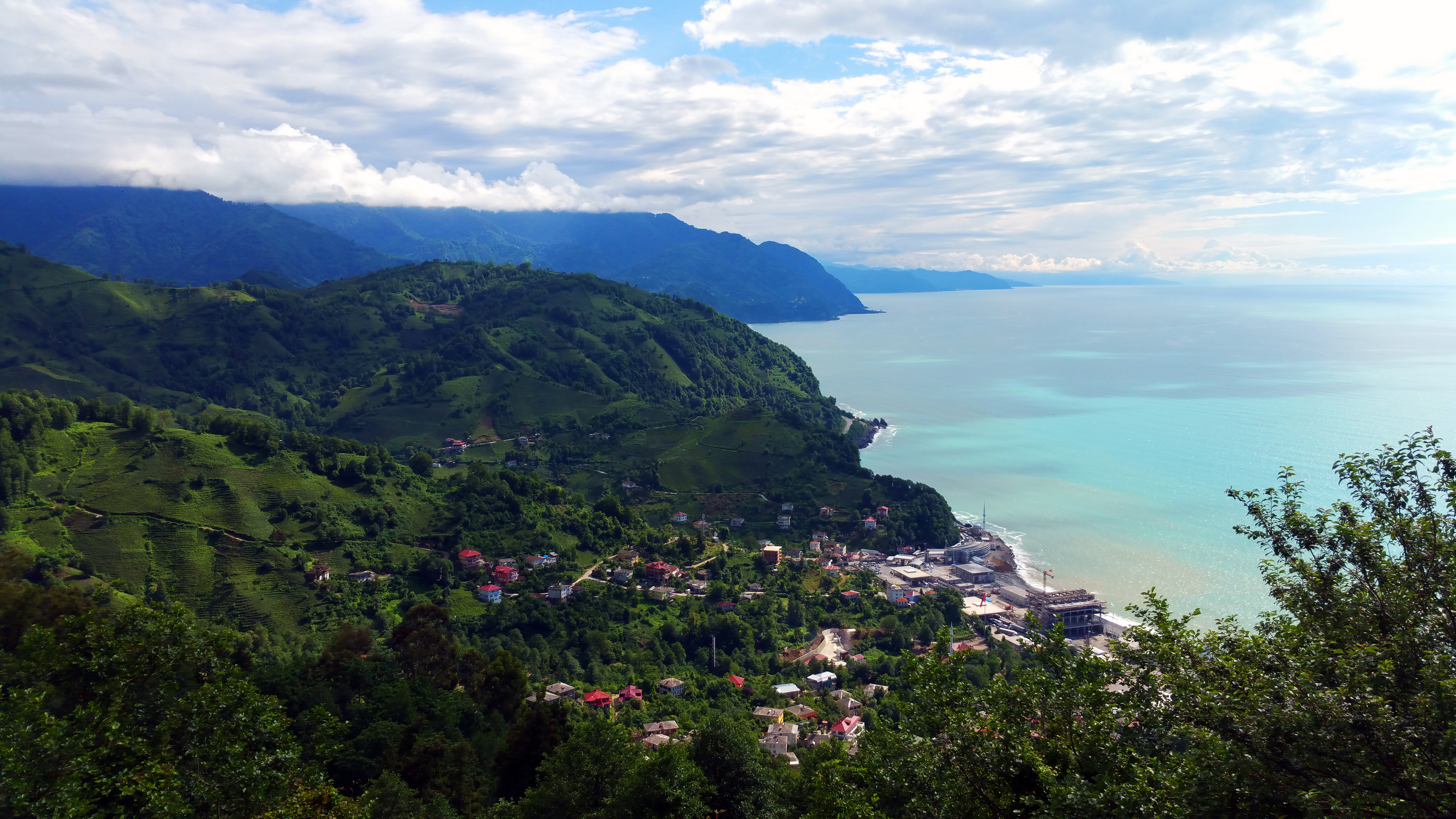
View of Sarpi

The modern celebration of Kolkhoba dates back to 1978, when the Laz community living in Adjara, at the time an autonomous republic of Soviet Georgia, demanded a national holiday. Though the Soviet Union was opposed to the rise of Georgian nationalism, giving a voice to Laz ethnic nationalism was seen as a strategic decision, encouraging potential separatism amongst the Laz communities of Turkey, a NATO country. On 7 August 1978, the first Kolkhoba was held with the financing of the Sarpi Farm Collective, under the Laz name of "Kvaomzakhoba" (ქვაომზახობა), while 19 August was declared the National Day of the Laz People. The 1978 celebration was significantly promoted by Soviet leadership, as is shown in the heavy presence of guests from across the Soviet Union and Warsaw Pact countries and its subsequent press coverage.

In 1979, the holiday was officially named "Kolkhoba". Its establishment has been seen as one of the most significant events in the local history of Sarpi and gathered significant interest from the Georgian intelligentsia. In 1990, poet Iasha Tandilava, himself from Sarpi, dedicated a poem to the celebration:

კოლხობა! კოლხთა ულევ ქველობით,
სარფის ფერდობზე ოქრო იღვრება
თავებს მიწამდე გიხრით, ძველებო,
ამდენ სიხარულს რა გაეძლება.

Kolkhoba! With the goodwill of the infinite Colchians,
Gold runs down the hill of Sarpi
We bow our heads down to the ground, o old ones,
how can we sustain such happiness

Kolkhoba continued to be celebrated every year until the collapse of the Soviet Union in 1991. The holiday was no longer marked during the 1990s as Georgia endured civil strife and a dire economic collapse. However, authorities restored the celebration on 19 August 2000, under the leadership of then-local strongman Aslan Abashidze, who was pursuing an increasingly autonomous course, away from the Georgian central government. Since then, the Ministry of Culture of Adjara and the Khelvachauri Municipality have been the sole organizers of the holiday, although it has gained the attention of nationwide figures at times, including the Catholicos-Patriarch of Georgia Ilia II who attended the celebration in 2011.

While the central location of the festival has been in Sarpi, Adjarian authorities have recently sought to move it to Gonio, where lay the ruins of a Roman-era fortress and though Laz folklore had traditionally the main component of the holiday, Kolkhoba has now become a commemoration of the ancient history of Colchis, with a particular focus on the mythical figure of Aeëtes and the myth of the Argonauts. Folkloric events have also been reported in recent years on the Turkish side of Lazeti. In 2017, the Turkish-based Laz Institute noted:

Kolkhoba, which started as a humble and civil holiday celebration, is now a 'festival' consisting of concerts, completely emptied, deviated from its purpose, turned into a propaganda area, under the control of an official institution.

An official date for the Kolkhoba celebration has not been set by local authorities and celebrations have been held in late August or early September and, in rare occasions, in October. The lack of an official date has been criticized by Laz groups as a way to keep all celebrations under the tight control of the Adjarian government, especially as celebrations are seldom announced more than a week prior.

== Customs ==
The 1978 festival saw events taking place throughout the southwestern part of Adjara, including the unveiling of a five-meter painting symbolizing Laz folklore in Kvariati, parades by young people dressed in ancient Laz military clothing on the road to Sarpi, concerts by Georgian and Laz folk ensembles, and exhibitions organized by youth groups on Laz culture held in several villages. These events, finalized with large feasts featuring Laz toasts, would be repeated throughout the Soviet era.

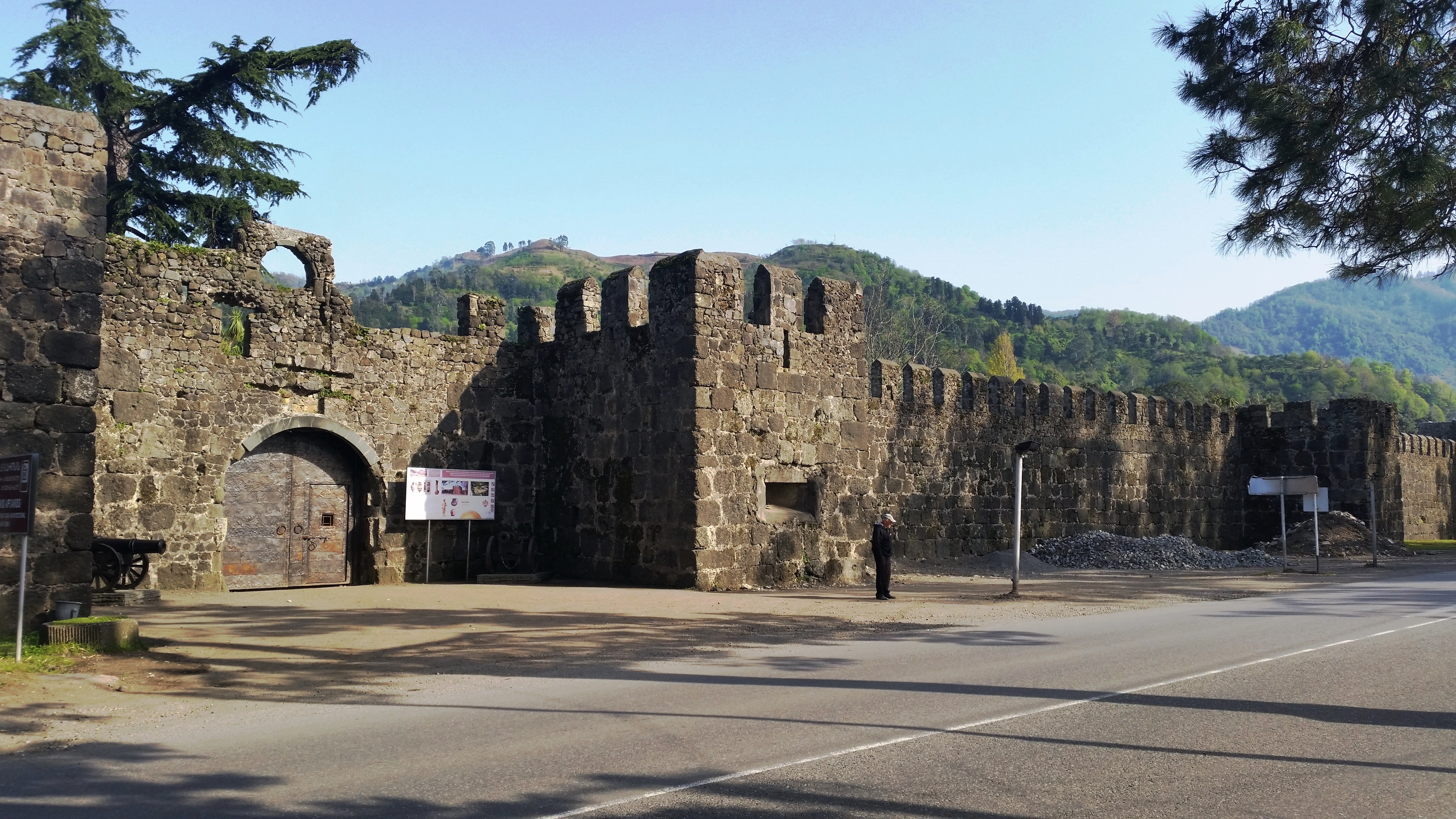
The Gonio Fortress ruins

Progressively, the myth of the Argonauts played an increasingly large role in the Kolkhoba celebration. Already in 1978, a reenactment of the battle between the Argonauts and Colchian troops took place in Sarpi, while theatrical plays of the myth held at the Gonio Fortress have become an annual part of the holiday in recent years. Sometimes, exhibits on the history of Colchis and the regions' relations with ancient Greece and the Roman Empire have been central features of the celebration. While the myth of King Aeëtes is a central part of the history of Colchis, historians associate the figure with the City of Kutaisi more than with Adjara.

In recent years, the Kolkhoba festival has also featured concerts and special events at the Sarpi Ethnographic Museum. Paradoxically, exhibits on the history of the holiday have also become a central aspect of the holiday itself. A 2015 report by Batumi State University noted that "locals feel that the celebration has lost its originality and has become too formal," proposing to decentralize the organization of Kolkhoba and leave it only in the hands of the Town of Sarpi.

== See also ==
- Laz people
- History of Adjara
