= Laz people =

Ethnic group from the South Caucasus

Laz, Lazi (ლაზი, ლაზეფე)
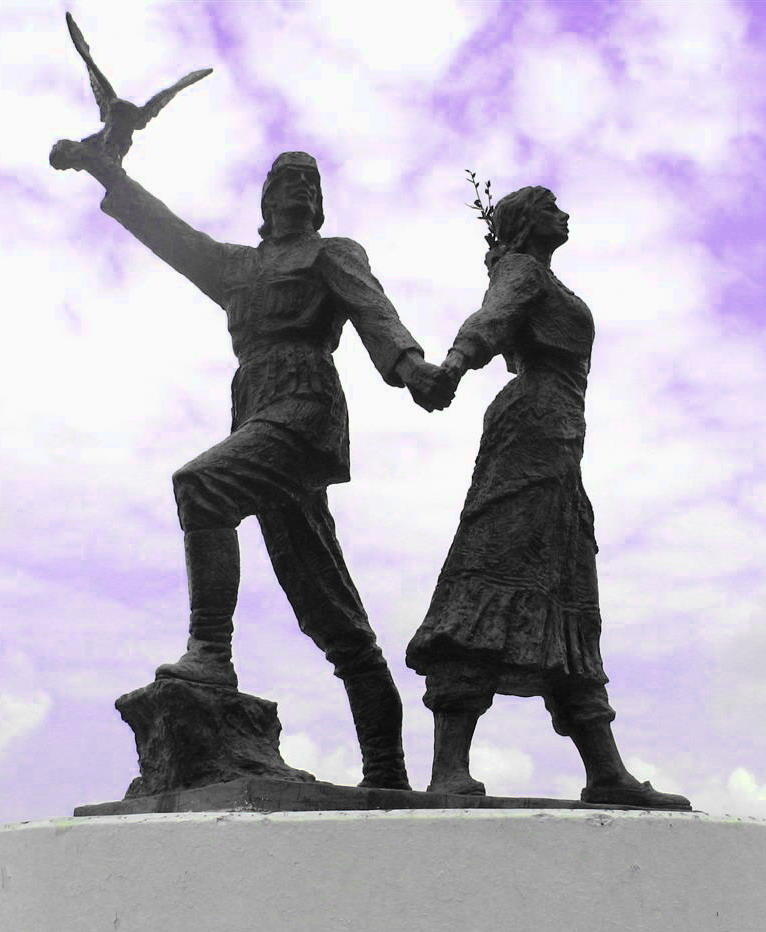
- Statue of a Laz man and woman in Arhavi (Ark'abi), Turkey

Total population
- 140,000

Regions with significant populations
- Turkey: 103,900 (Ethnologue, 2019)
- Georgia: 1,000 (2007)
- Germany: 1,000 (2007)

Languages
- Laz, Georgian, Turkish

Religion
- In Turkey: majority Sunni Islam; In Georgia: majority Georgian Orthodox

Related ethnic groups
- Georgians (especially Mingrelians and Adjarians), Pontic Greeks

The Laz people, or Lazi (Laz: ლაზი Lazi; Georgian: ლაზი, lazi; or ჭანი, ch'ani; Turkish: Laz), are a Kartvelian ethnic group native to the South Caucasus, who mainly live in Black Sea coastal regions of Turkey and Georgia. They traditionally speak the Laz language but have been subjected to a process of deliberate Turkification under the lengthy Turkish rule.

Of the 103,900 ethnic Laz in Turkey, only around 20,000 speak Laz and the language is classified as threatened (6b) in Turkey and shifting (7) in Georgia on the Expanded Graded Intergenerational Disruption Scale.

== Etymology ==
The ancestors of the Laz people are cited by many classical authors from Scylax to Procopius and Agathias, but the word Lazi in Latin language (Greek: Λαζοί, romanized: Lazoí) themselves are firstly cited by Pliny around the 2nd century BC.

== Identity ==
=== Self-Identification ===
Vladimir Minorsky, Russian scholar of Kartvelian Laz studies, observed in 1913 that the Laz living in Turkey and Georgia have developed different understandings of what it means to be Laz. The Laz identity inside Georgia has largely merged with the national Georgian identity, with "Laz" being seen merely as any other regional category of Georgians. Georgian Orthodox believers also commemorate Three Hundred Laz Martyrs, who are credited with sacrificing their lives rather than give up their identity under Ottoman persecution.

=== Identification by non-Laz ===
In a stereotyping manner, non-Laz often use the exonym Laz for groups that are mostly not ethnic Laz:

1. In Turkey, the term Laz is a 'folk' definition and exonym for anyone originating in the eastern Black Sea coast of Turkey. Sometimes, the term is extended to the western portion of the coast as well. Therefore, this term is often used mostly for ethnic Pontic Greeks, Turks in addition to Laz in Turkey.
2. The residents of the northwestern portion of the Gümüşhane are viewed as Laz by other people from Gümüşhane.
3. The residents of Posof are named as Laz by neighboring communities.
4. The Pontic Greek-speakers from the villages of Emek and Dönerdere in Van are called as Laz by the neighboring communities.
5. A small community living in the Caspian coast of Iran is called as Laz.

== History ==
=== Origins ===
The Lazuri-speaking ancestors of the modern Laz originally hailed from the northeast, around Abkhazia and Samegrelo-Zemo Svaneti and settled in the present homeland of the Laz in antiquity.

Modern theories suggest that the Colchian tribes are direct ancestors of the Laz-Mingrelians, they constituted the dominant ethnic and cultural presence in the south-eastern Black Sea region in antiquity, and hence played a significant role in the ethnogenesis of the modern Georgians.

=== Antiquity ===
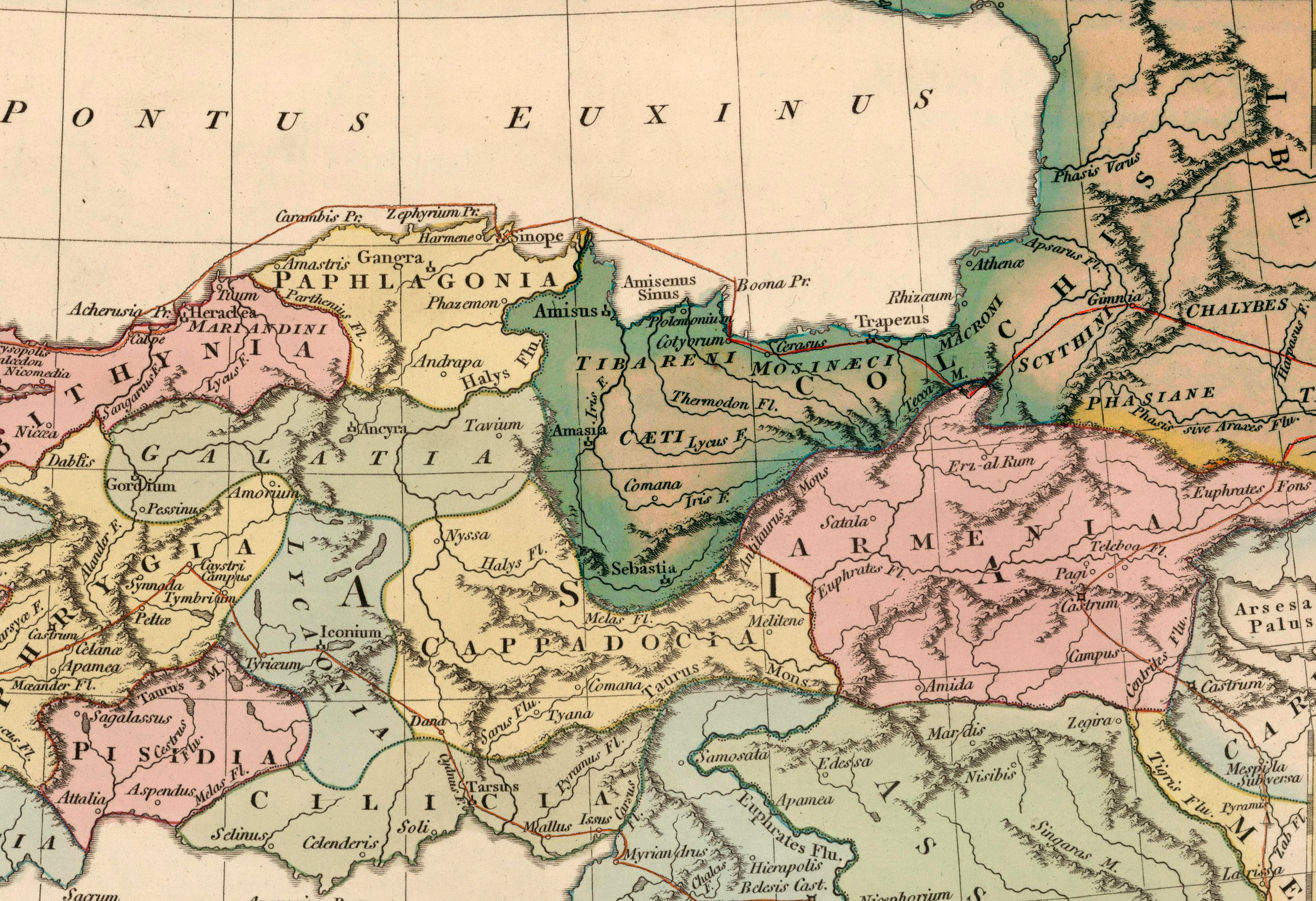
Boundaries of southern part of Colchis, from Reditus Decem Millium Graecorum, 1815

In the thirteenth century BC, the Kingdom of Colchis was formed as a result of the increasing consolidation of the tribes inhabiting the region, which covered modern western Georgia and Turkey's north-eastern provinces of Trabzon, Rize and Artvin. Colchis was an important region in Black Sea trade – rich with gold, wax, hemp, and honey. In the eighth century, several Greek trading colonies were established along the shores of the Black Sea, one of them being Trebizond (Greek: Τραπεζοῦς, romanized: Trapezous) founded by Milesian traders from Sinope in 756 BC. Trebizond's trade partners included the Proto-Laz tribes of Mossynoeci.

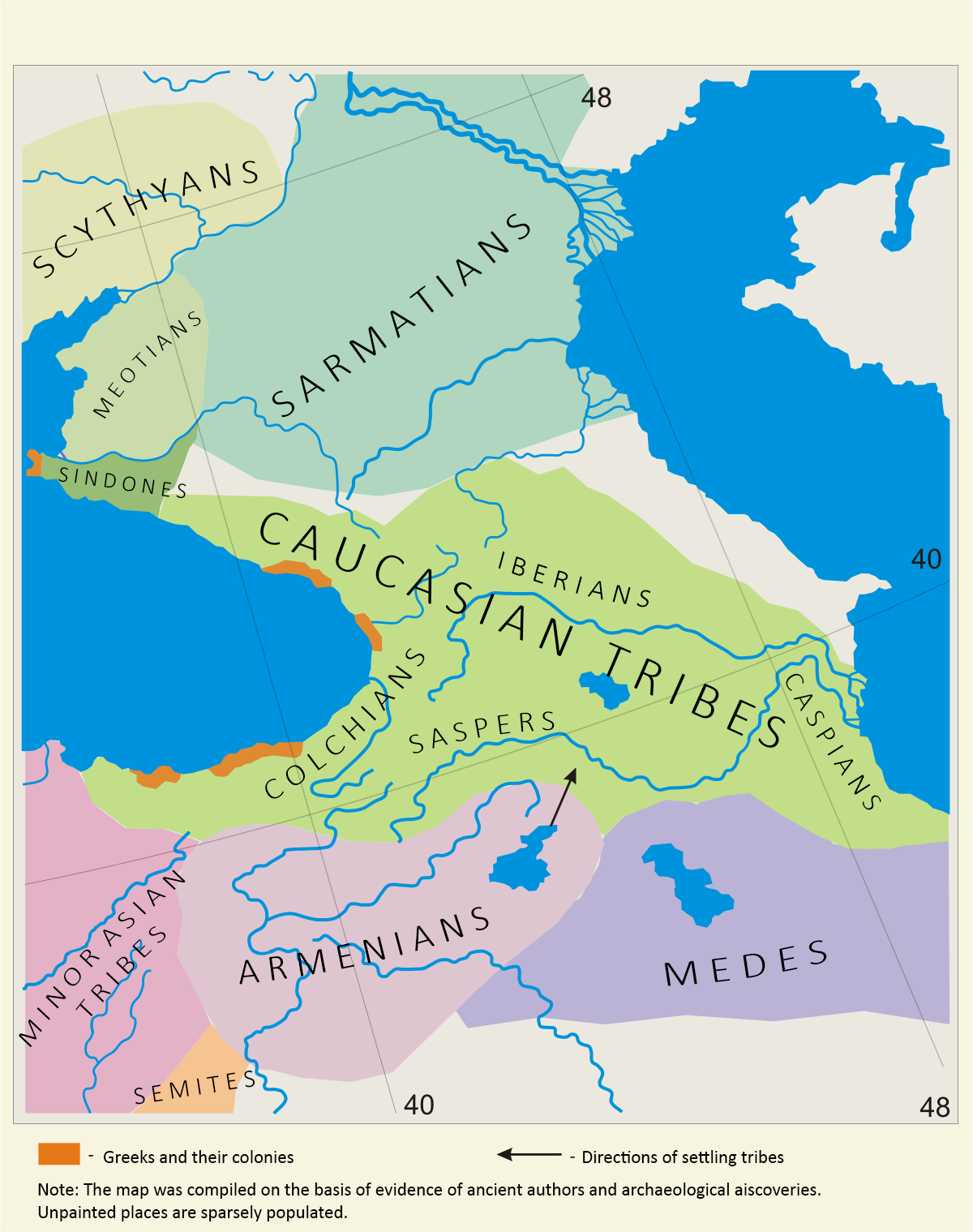
Ethnic map of the Caucasus in the 5th and 4th centuries BC

By the sixth century BC, the tribes living in the southern Colchis (Macrones, Mossynoeci, Marres etc.) were incorporated into the nineteenth satrapy of Persia. The Achaemenid Empire was defeated by Alexander the Great, however following the Alexander's death a number of separate kingdoms were established in Anatolia, including Pontus, in the corner of the southern Black Sea, ruled by the Persian nobleman Mithridates I. Culturally, the kingdom was Hellenized, with Greek as the official language. Mithridates VI conquered the Colchis, and gave it to his son Mithridates of Colchis.

As a result of the Roman campaigns between 88 and 63 BC, led by the generals Pompey and Lucullus, the kingdom of Pontus was completely destroyed by the Romans and all its territory, including Colchis, was incorporated into the Roman Empire. The former southern provinces of Colchis were reorganized into the Roman province of Pontus Polemoniacus, while the northern Cholchis became the Roman province of Lazicum. Roman control remained likewise only nominal over the tribes of the interior.

The first-century historians Memnon and Strabo remark in passing that the people formerly called Macrones bore in his day the name of Sanni, a claim supported also by Stephanus of Byzantium. The second-century historian Arrian notes that Tzanni, same as the Sanni are neighbours of the Colchians, while the latter were now referred to as the Lazi. By the mid-third century, the Lazi tribe came to dominate most of Colchis, establishing the kingdom of Lazica.

=== Middle Ages ===
The kingdom of Lazica in late antiquity

The warlike tribes of the Chaldia, called Tzanni, the ancestors of modern Laz people lived in Tzanica, the area located between the Byzantine and the Lazica. It included several settlements named: Athenae, Archabis and Apsarus; Tzanni were neither subjects of the Romans nor of the king of the Lazica, except that during the reign of the Byzantine emperor Justinian I (r. 527–565) they were subdued, Christianized and brought to central rule. The bishops of Lazica appointed the priests of the Tzanni, given they were now Christians. Tzanni began to have closer contact with the Greeks and acquired various Hellenic cultural traits, including in some cases the language.

From 542 to 562, Lazica was a scene of the protracted rivalry between the Eastern Roman and Sassanid empires, culminating in the Lazic War, where 1,000 Tzanni auxiliaries under Dagisthaeus participated. Emperor Heraclius's offensive in 628 AD brought victory over the Persians and ensured Roman predominance in Lazica until the invasion and conquest of the Caucasus by the Arabs in the second half of the seventh century. As the result of Muslim invasions, the ancient metropolis, Phasis, was lost and Trebizond became the new Metropolitan see of Lazica, since then the name Lazi appears the general Greek name for Tzanni. According to Geography of Anania Shirakatsi of the 7th century, Colchis (Yeger in Armenian sources, synonymous with Lazica) was subdivided into four small districts, one of them being Tzanica, that is Chaldia, and mentions Athinae, Rhizus and Trebizond among its cities. From the second half of the eight century the Trebizond area is referred to in Greek sources (namely of Epiphanius of Constantinople) as Lazica. The 10th-century Arab geographer Abul Feda regarded the city of Trebizond as being largely a Lazian port.

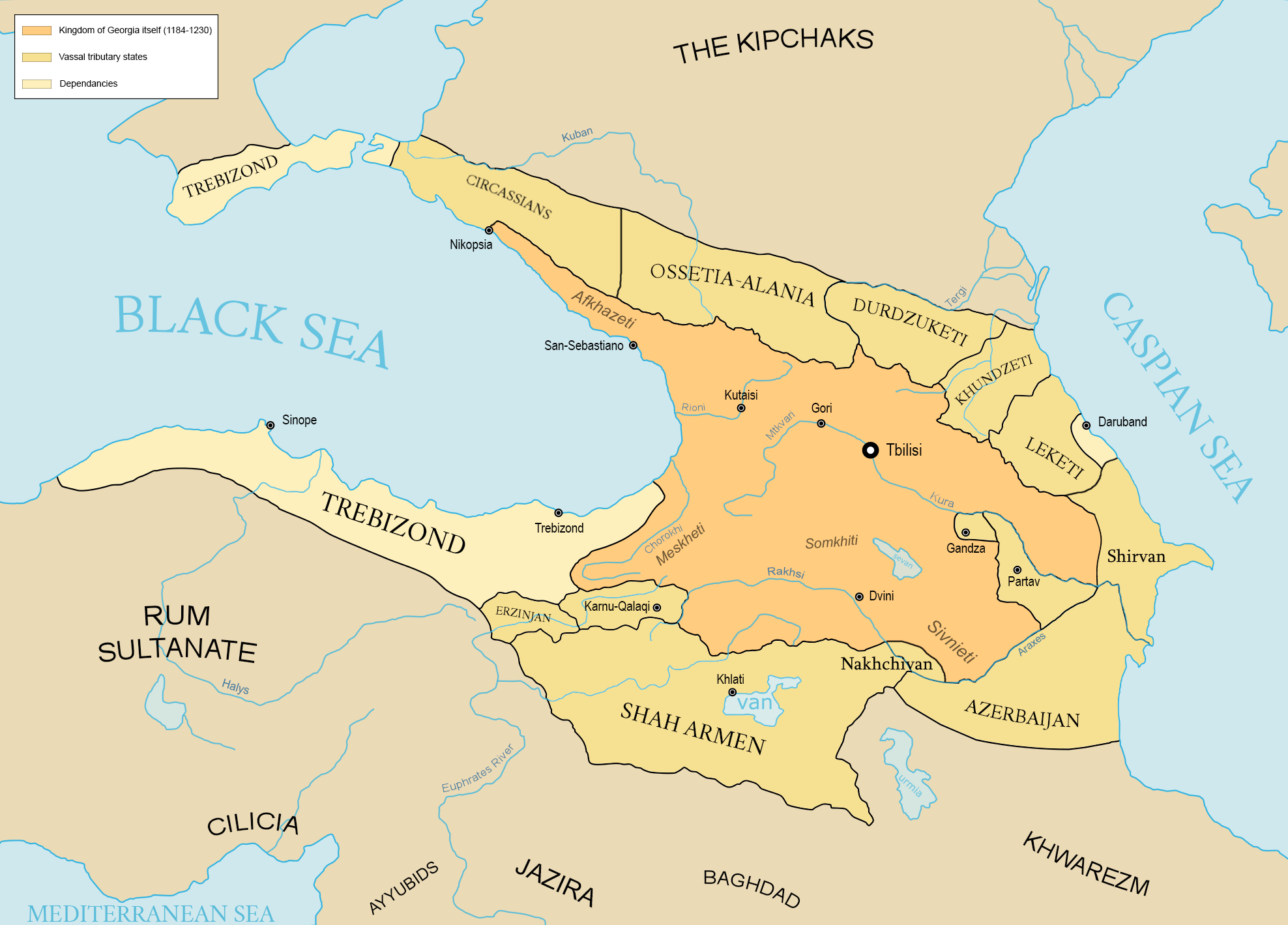
Kingdom of Georgia at the height of its development in the Middle Ages

In 780, the kingdom of Abkhazia incorporated the former territories of Lazica via a dynastic succession, thus ousting the Pontic Lazs (formerly known as Tzanni) from western Georgia; thereafter, the Tzanni lived under nominal Byzantine suzerainty in the theme of Chaldia, with its capital at Trebizond, governed by the native semi-autonomous rulers, like the Gabras family, of possibly "Greco-Laz" or simply Chaldian origin.

With the Georgian intervention in Chaldia and the collapse of the Byzantine Empire in 1204, the Empire of Trebizond was established along the southeastern coast of the Black Sea, populated by a large Kartvelian-speaking population. In the eastern part of the same empire, an autonomous coastal theme of Greater Lazia was established. Byzantine authors, such as Pachymeres, and to some extent Trapezuntines such as Lazaropoulos and Bessarion, regarded the Trapezuntian Empire as being no more than a Lazian border state. Though Greek in higher culture, the rural areas of Trebizond empire appear to have been predominantly Laz in ethnic composition. Laz family names, with Hellenized terminations, are noticeable in the records of the mediaeval empire of Trebizond, and it is perhaps not too venturesome to suggest that the antagonism between the "town-party" and the "country-party," which existed in the politics of "the Empire," was in fact a national antagonism of Laz against Greek.

In 1282, the kingdom of Imereti besieged Trebizond, however after the failed attempt to take the city, the Georgians occupied several provinces, and all the Trebizontine province of Lazia threw off its allegiance to the king of the 'Iberian' and 'Lazian' tribes and united itself with the Georgian Kingdom of Imereti.

=== Early Modern era ===
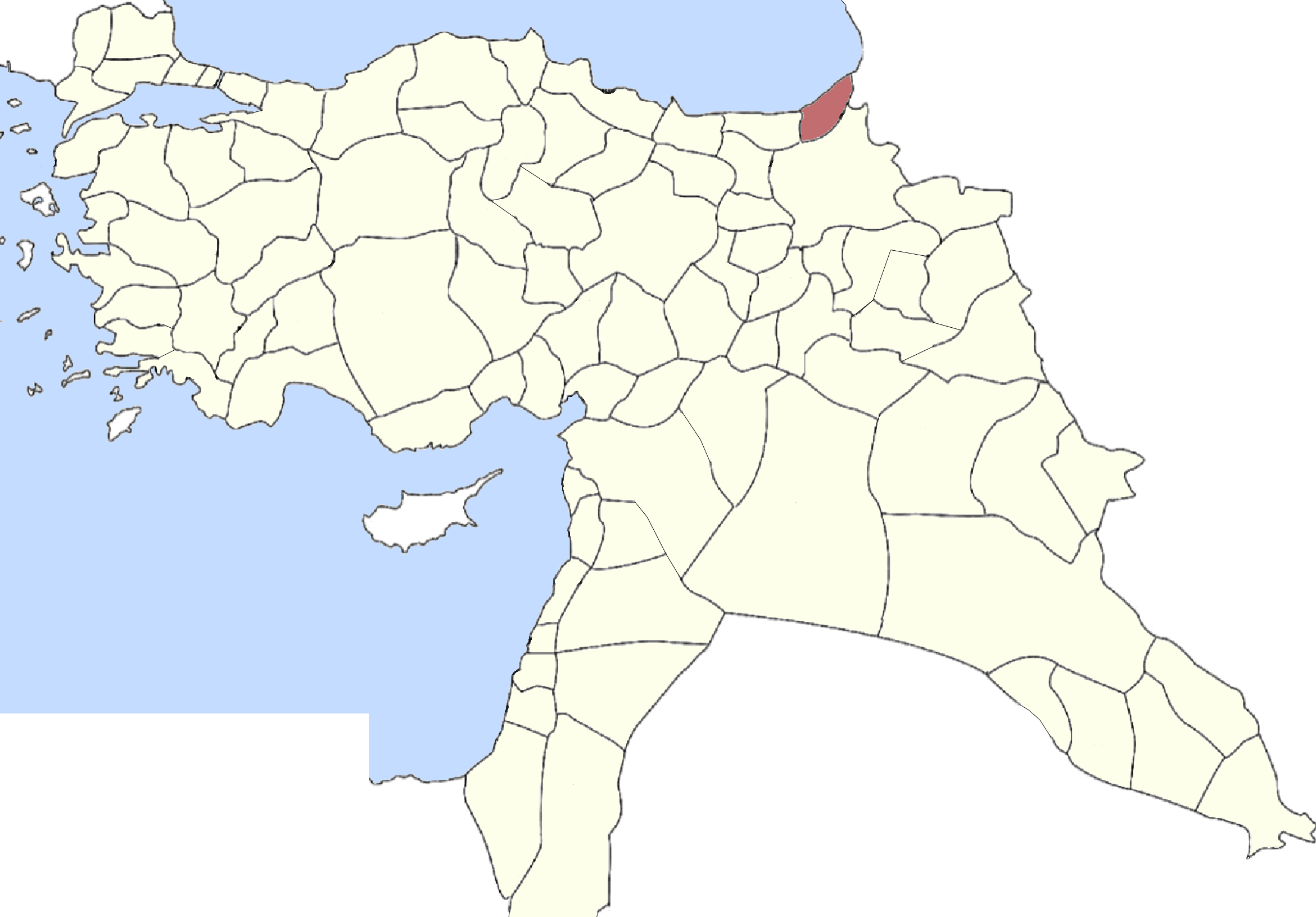
Sanjak of Lazistan, Ottoman Anatolia, 1914

Laz populated area was often contested by different Georgian principalities, however through Battle of Murjakheti in 1535, Principality of Guria ensured control over it, until 1547, when it was finally conquered by resurgent Ottoman forces and reorganized into the Lazistan sanjak as part of eyalet of Trabzon.

The Ottomans fought for three centuries to destroy the Christian-Georgian consciousness of the Laz people. Due to the Ottoman Islamization policy, throughout of seventeenth century Lazs gradually converted to Islam. As the Ottomans consolidated their rule, the Millet system was brought to the newly conquered territories. Local Orthodox inhabitants, once subordinated to the Georgian Orthodox Church, had to obey Patriarchate of Constantinople, thus gradually becoming Greeks, the process known as Hellenization of Laz people. Lazs who were under the control of Constantinople, soon lost their language and self-identity as they became Greeks and learned Greek, especially Pontic dialect of Greek language, although native language was preserved by Lazs who had become Muslims.

Not only the Pashas (governors) of Trabzon until the 19th century, but real authority in many of the cazas (districts) of each sanjak by the mid-17th century lay in the hands of relatively independent native Laz derebeys ("valley-lords"), or feudal chiefs who exercised absolute authority in their own districts, carried on petty warfare with each other, did not owe allegiance to a superior and never paid contributions to the sultan. In the period following the war of 1828–1829, Sultan Mahmud II attempted to break the power of the great independent derebeys of Lazistan. In the event, the Laz derebeys, led by Tahir Ağa Tuzcuoğlu of Rize, did rise in revolt in 1832. The revolt was initially successful: at its height in January 1833, but by the spring of 1834, the rising had been put down. The suppression of the rising had finally broken the power of the Laz derebeys. This state of insubordination was not really broken until the assertion of Ottoman authority during the reforms of the Osman Pasha in the 1850s.

In 1547, Ottomans built coastal fortress of Gonia, an important Ottoman outpost in southwestern Georgia, which served as capital of Lazistan; then Batum until it was acquired according to the Congress of Berlin by the Russians in 1878, throughout the Russo-Turkish War, thereafter, Rize became the capital of the sanjak. The Muslim Lazs living in newly established Batumi Oblast were subjected to ethnic cleansing; by 1882, approximately 40,000 Lazs had settled in the Ottoman Empire, especially to provinces in Western Anatolia such as Bursa, Yalova, Karamursel, Izmit, Adapazarı and Sapanca. With the spread of Young Turk movement in Lazistan, the short-lived autonomist national movement headed by Faik Efendişi was established. However, it was soon eliminated as the result of Abdul Hamid's intervention. During the First World War (1914–1918) Russians invaded the provinces of Rize and Trabzon. However, following the Bolshevik Revolution in 1917, the Russian forces had to withdraw from the region and finally left the area to the Ottoman-Turkish forces in March 1918. From 1918 to 1920, the national movement swept rapidly all around Lazistan, committees and an interim government was created. It was oriented towards Soviet Russia. But as soon as, the Soviet-Turkish treaty of friendship was concluded, it helped the Turks, to integrate Lazistan. The autonomous Lazistan sanjak existed until 1923, while the designation of the term of Lazistan was officially banned in 1926, by the Kemalists. Lazistan was divided between Rize and Artvin provinces.

During the beginning of the Stalinist era, the Lazs living under Soviet domination had a certain cultural autonomy in the Soviet Union but after breakout of the Second World War, Soviet authorities designed a strategy to ethnically cleanse the border regions of populations it deemed unreliable. The Laz population was sent to exile in Siberia and Central Asia. After the death Stalin in 1953, the political climate had changed that between 1953 and 1957 the surviving Lazs were allowed to return to their homeland.

=== Modern ===
Most Laz people today live in Turkey, but the Laz minority group has no official status in Turkey. The number of the Laz speakers is decreasing, and is now limited chiefly to some areas in Rize and Artvin.

== Population and geographical distribution ==
The total population of the Laz today is only estimated, with numbers ranging widely. The majority of Laz live in Turkey, where the national census does not record ethnic data on minor populations.

=== Settlements ===
Country / region	Official data	Estimate	Concentration	Article
Turkey	—	103,900	Rize: Pazar, Ardeşen, Fındıklı, Çamlıhemşin and Ikizdere districts. Artvin: Arhavi and Hopa. minorities in: Borçka district. Trabzon : Of; Anatolia: Karamürsel in Kocaeli, Akçakoca in Düzce, Sakarya, Zonguldak, Bartın, Istanbul and Ankara	Laz people in Turkey
Georgia	—	1,000	Tbilisi; Adjara: Sarpi, Kvariati, Gonio, Makho, Batumi and Kobuleti. Samegrelo-Zemo Svaneti: Zugdidi and Anaklia.	Laz people in Georgia
Germany	—	1,000	—	Laz people in Germany
Russia	160	—	—	—

=== Area ===
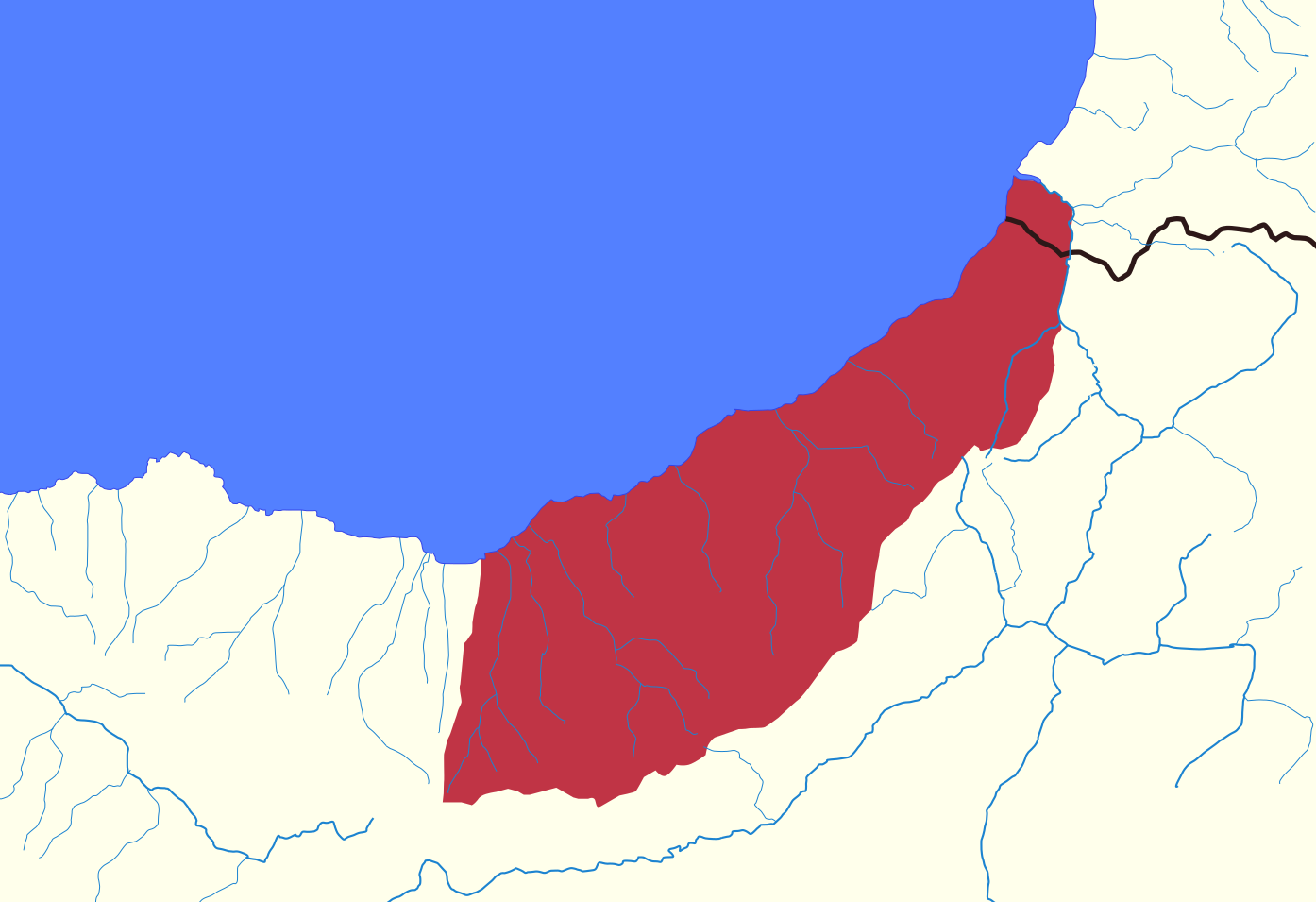
Map of Lazistan

The majority of the Laz today live in an area they call Laziǩa, Lazistan, Lazeti or Lazona name of the cultural region traditionally inhabited by the Laz people in modern northeast Turkey and southwest Georgia. Geographically, Lazistan consists of a series of narrow, rugged valleys extending northward from the crest of the Pontic Alps (Turkish: Anadolu Dağları), which separate it from the Çoruh Valley, and stretches east–west along the southern shore of the Black Sea. Lazistan is a virtually a forbidden term in Turkey. (Note: "Article 8 of the Anti-Terror Law (Law No. 3713 amended by Law No. 4126) reads, "No one may engage in written and oral propaganda aimed at disrupting the indivisible integrity of the State of the Turkish Republic, country, and nation. [… ] Those who engage in such deeds will be sentenced to from one to three years in prison and given a heavy fine […]". This article means that those who orally or in print make use of words such as Lazistan or Kurdistan risk prosecution.") the name was considered to be an 'unpatriotic' invention of ancien regime.

Laz ancestral lands are not a well-defined and there is no official geographic definition for the boundaries of Lazistan. However, parts of the following provinces are usually included:

- Adjara region in Georgia
- Artvin province in Turkey
- Rize province in Turkey
- Trabzon province in Turkey

=== Economy ===
Historically, Lazistan was known for producing hazelnuts. Lazistan also produced zinc, producing over 1,700 tons in 1901. The traditional Laz economy was based on agriculture—carried out with some difficulty in the steep mountain regions and also on the breeding of sheep, goats, and cattle. Orchards were tended and bees were kept, and the food supply was augmented by hunting. The Laz are good sailors and also practise agriculture rice, maize, tobacco and fruit-trees. The only industries were smelting, celebrated since ancient times, and the cutting of timber used for shipbuilding.

== Culture ==
Over the past 20 years, there has been an upsurge of cultural activities aiming at revitalizing the Laz language, education and tradition. Kâzım Koyuncu, who in 1998 became the first Laz musician to gain mainstream success, contributed significantly to the identity of the Laz people, especially among their youth.

The Laz Cultural Institute was founded in 1993 and the Laz Culture Association in 2008, and a Laz cultural festival was established in Gemlik. The Laz community successfully lobbied Turkey's Education Ministry to offer Laz-language instruction in schools around the Black Sea region. In 2013, the Education Ministry added Laz as a four-year elective course for secondary students, beginning in the fifth grade.

=== Language ===
Distribution of the South Caucasian languages

Lazuri is a complex and morphologically rich tongue belonging to the South Caucasian language family whose other members are Mingrelian, Svan and Georgian. N. Marr regarded Laz and Megrelian, two dialects of "linguistically one" language, as two languages. The Laz language does not have a written history, thus Turkish and Georgian serve as the main literary languages for the Laz people. Their folk literature has been transmitted orally and has not been systematically recorded. The first attempts at establishing a distinct Laz cultural identity and creating a literary language based on the Arabic alphabet was made by Faik Efendisi in the 1870s, but he was soon imprisoned by the Ottoman authorities, while most of his works were destroyed. During a relative cultural autonomy granted to the minorities in the 1930s, the written Laz literature—based on the Laz script—emerged in Soviet Georgia, strongly dominated by Soviet ideology. The poet Mustafa Baniṣi spearheaded this short-lived movement, but an official standard form of the tongue was never established. Since then, several attempts have been made to render the pieces of native literature in the Turkish and Georgian alphabets. A few native poets in Turkey including Raşid Hilmi Pehlivanoğlu, a well- known figure in Rize district, have appeared later in the 20th century.

=== Religion ===
Andrew the Apostle after traveling from Trebizond into Lazica in the first century AD, built a church here. The significance of the apostle's activities was that he introduced the principle of Christian faith and thereby paved the way for later missionary activities. The Lazes were converted to Christianity in the 5th century by the first Christian king, Gubazes I of Lazica, who declared Christianity as a state religion of Lazica. After the introduction of Christianity, Phasis was the see of a Greek diocese, one of whose bishops, Cyrus, became a Patriarch of Alexandria between AD 630 and 641. Trebizond became the metropolitan see of Lazica when the ancient metropolis, Phasis, was lost by the Byzantine Empire. Trebizond, which was the only diocese established far in the past, Cerasous and Rizaion, both formed as upgraded bishoprics. All three dioceses survived the Ottoman conquest (1461) and generally operated until the 17th century, when the dioceses of Cerasous and Rizaion were abolished. The diocese of Rizaion and the bishopric of Of were abolished at the time due to the Islamisation of the Lazs. Most of them subsequently converted to Sunni Islam. There are several ruined churches in present-day Rize and Artvin districts, such as; Jibistasi in Ardeşen, Makriali (Noghedi) in Hopa, Pironity in Arhavi etc.

There are also a few Christian Laz in the Adjara region of Georgia who have reconverted to Christianity.

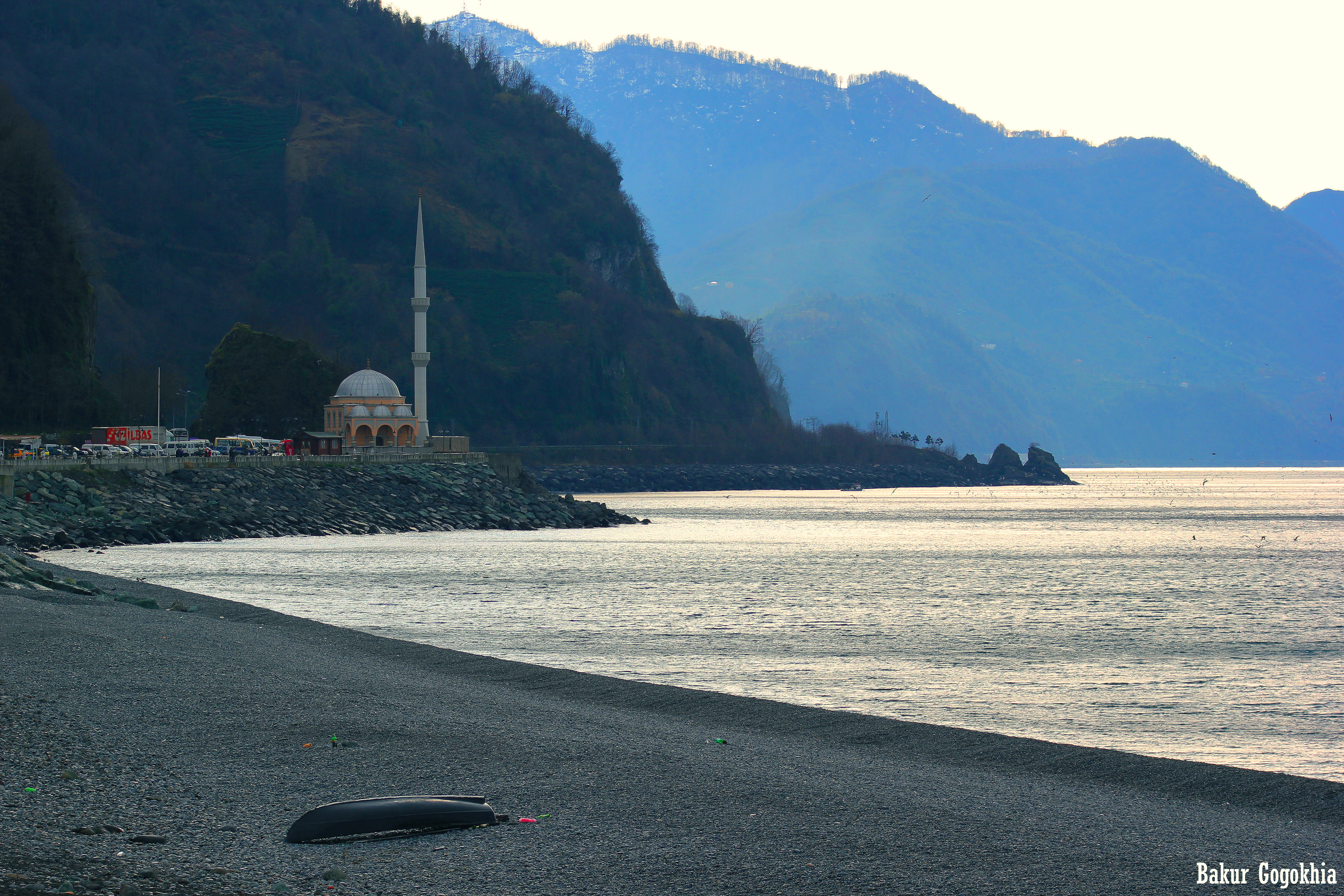
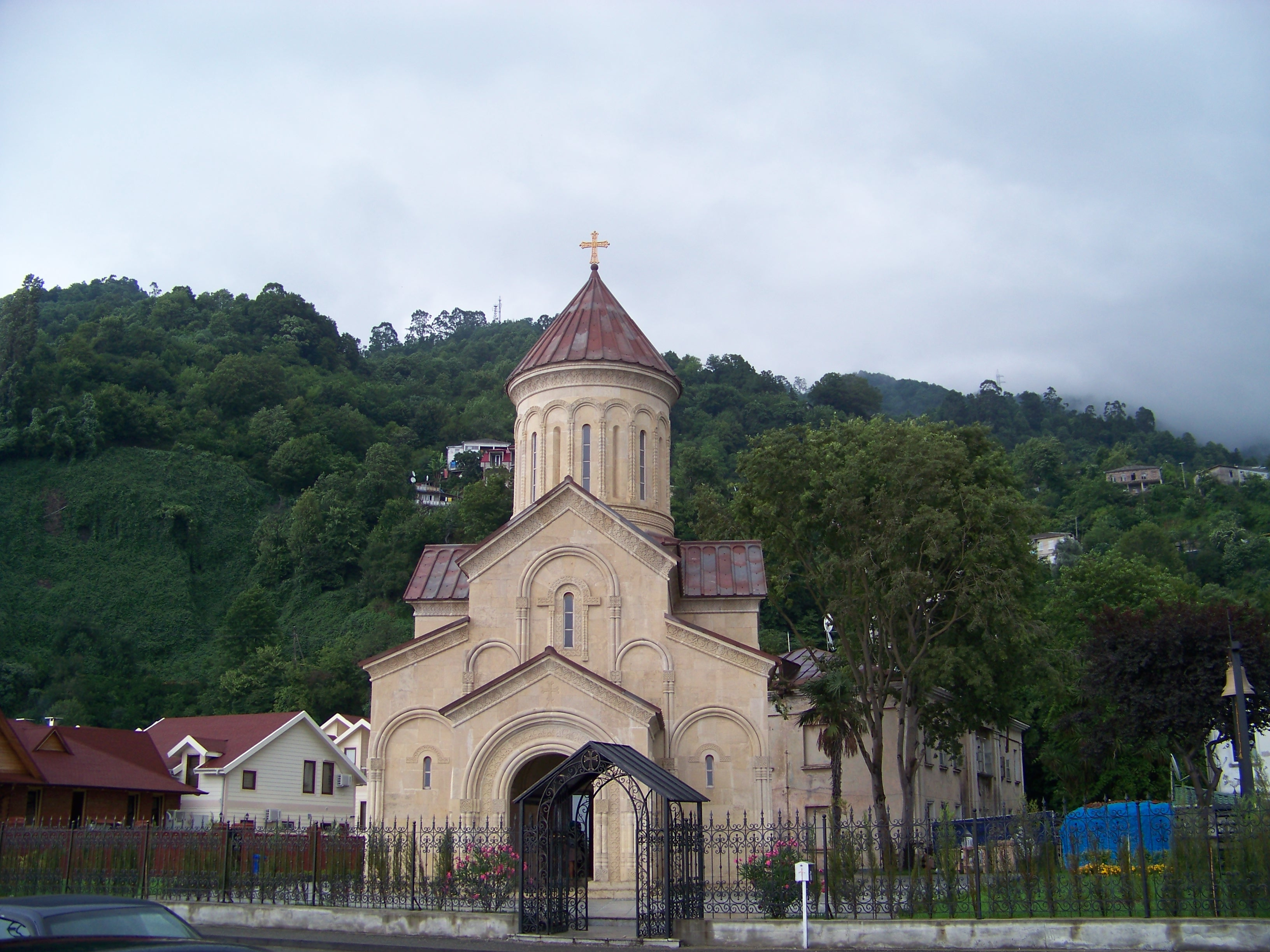
Mosque and Orthodox church in Sarpi, border village on the coast of the Black Sea, on the border between Turkey and Georgia.

=== Mythology ===
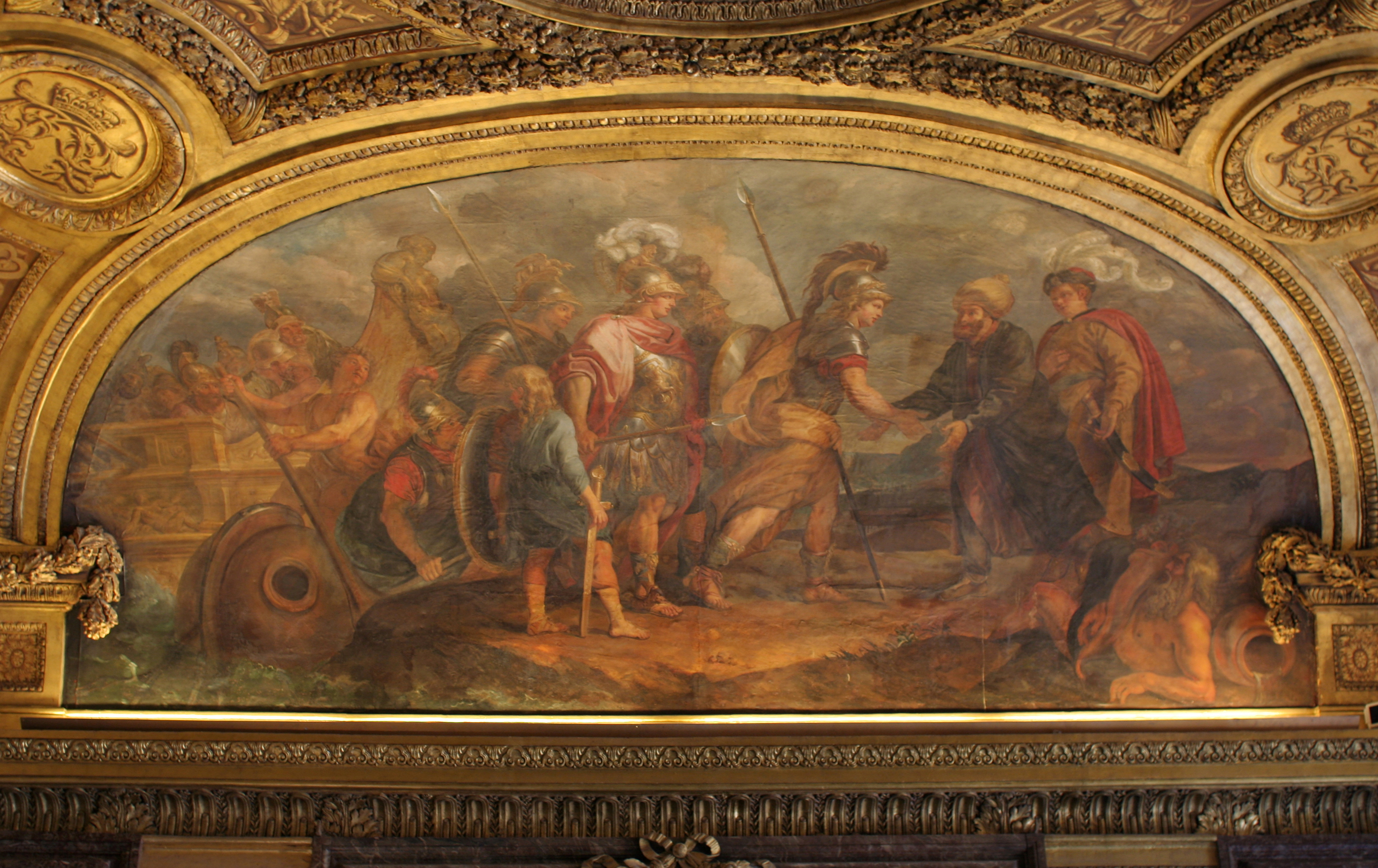
Jason and the Argonauts arriving at Colchis. The epic poem Argonautica (3rd century BC) tells the myth of their voyage to retrieve the Golden Fleece. This painting is located in the Palace of Versailles.

Famous for its saga and myths and bounded by the Black Sea and the Caucasian Mountains, the ancient region of Colchis spreads out from West Georgia to Northeast Turkey. The famous tale in Greek mythology of the Golden Fleece in which Jason and the Argonauts stole the Golden Fleece from King Aeetes, with the help of his daughter Medea, has brought Colchis into the history books.

=== Festival ===
Kolkhoba is an ancient Laz festival. It is held at the end of August or at the beginning of September in Sarpi village, Khelvachauri District. Festival has revived the former lifestyle of Lazeti residents and moments of human relations typical to the times of ancient Greece and Colchis related to the Argonauts journey to Colchis. During the celebration of Kolkhoba theater performances are followed by a variety of activities and it is considered one of the main public festivals.

=== Music ===
The national instruments include guda (bagpipe), kemenche (spike fiddle), zurna (oboe), and doli (drum). In the 1990s and 2000s, the folk-rock musician Kâzım Koyuncu attained to significant popularity in Turkey and toured Georgia. Koyuncu, who died of cancer in 2005, was also an activist for the Laz people and has become a cultural hero.

=== Dance ===
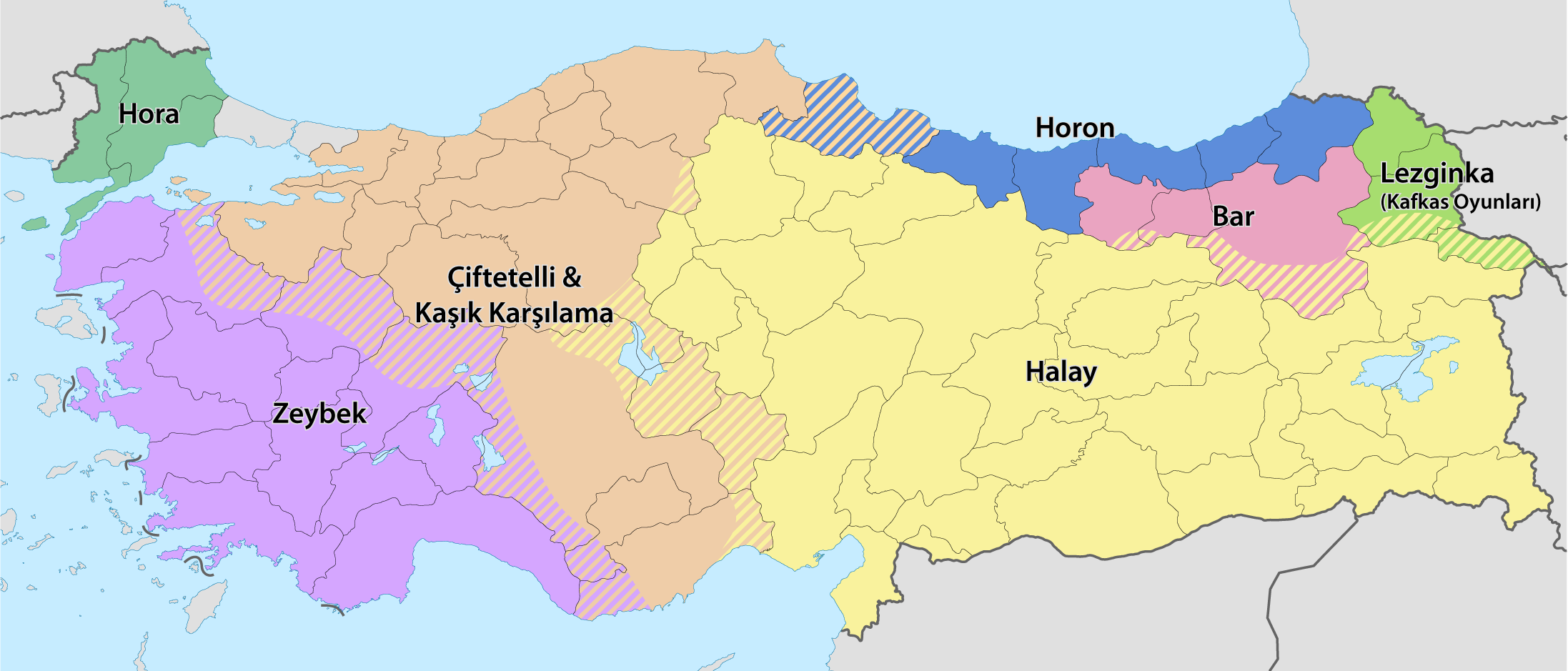
Extension and distribution of folk dances in Turkey

The Laz are noted for their folk dances, called the Horon dance of the Black Sea, originally of pagan worship which was to become a sacred ritual dance. There are many different types of this dance in different regions. Horon is related to those performed by the Ajarians known as Khorumi. These may be solemn and precise, performed by lines of men, with carefully executed footwork, or extremely vigorous with the men dancing erect with hands linked, making short rapid movements with their feet, punctuated by dropping to a crouch. The women's dances are graceful but more swift in movement than those encountered in Georgia. In Greece such dances are still associated with the Pontic Greeks who emigrated from this region after 1922.

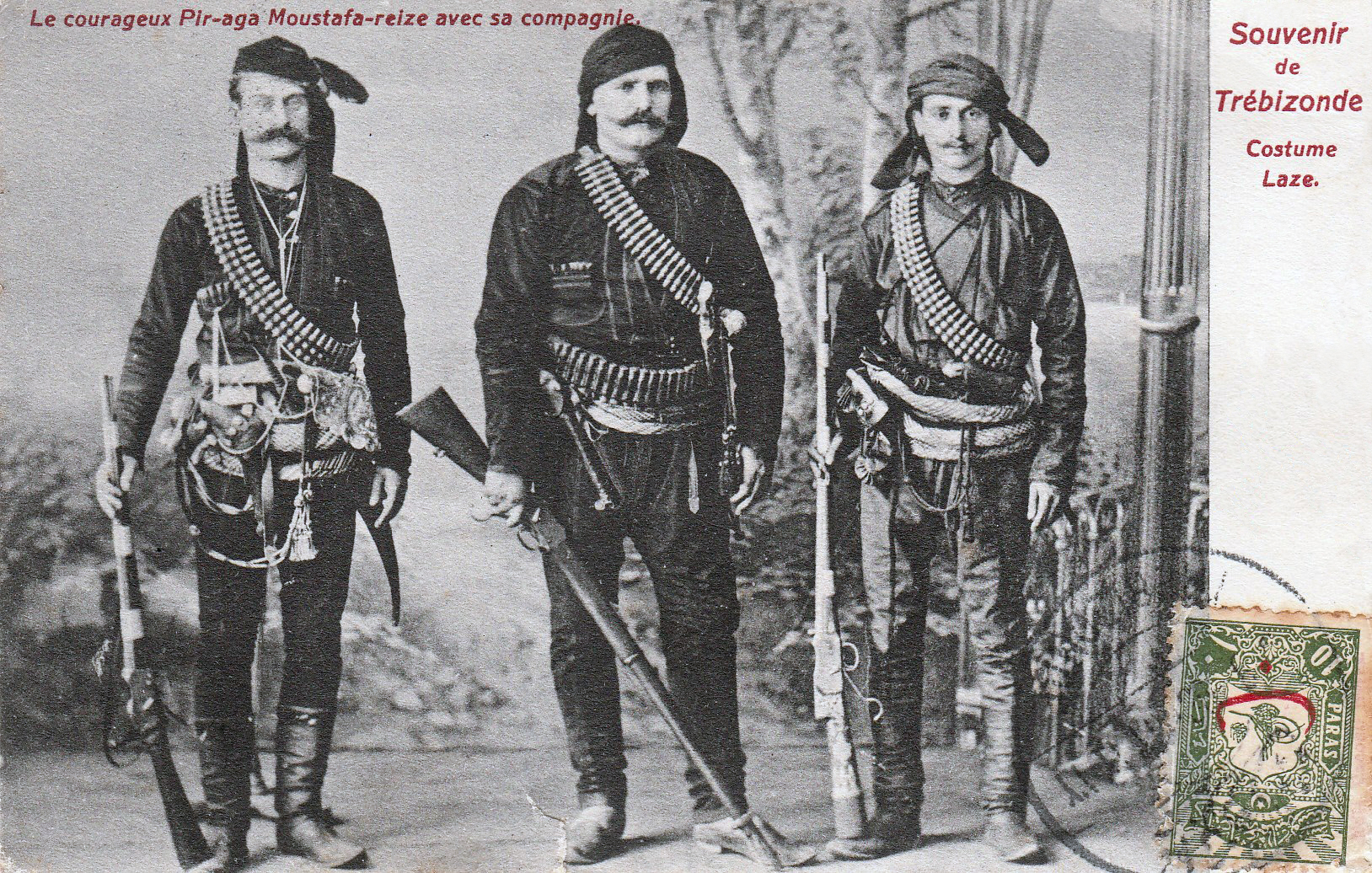
Postcard of Laz soldiers dressed in national clothes (Trabzon, Turkey).

=== Traditional clothing ===
The traditional Laz men's costume consists of a peculiar bandanalike kerchief covering the entire head above the eyes, knotted on the side and hanging down to the shoulder and the upper back; a snug-fitting jacket of coarse brown homespun with loose sleeves; and baggy dark brown woolen trousers tucked into slim, knee-high leather boots. The women's costume was similar to the wide-skirted princess gown found throughout Georgia but worn with a similar kerchief to that of the men and with a rich scarf tied around the hips. Laz men crafted excellent homemade rifles and even while at the plow were usually seen bristling with arms: rifle, pistol, powder horn, cartridge belts across the chest, a dagger at the hip, and a coil of rope for trussing captives.

=== Discrimination ===
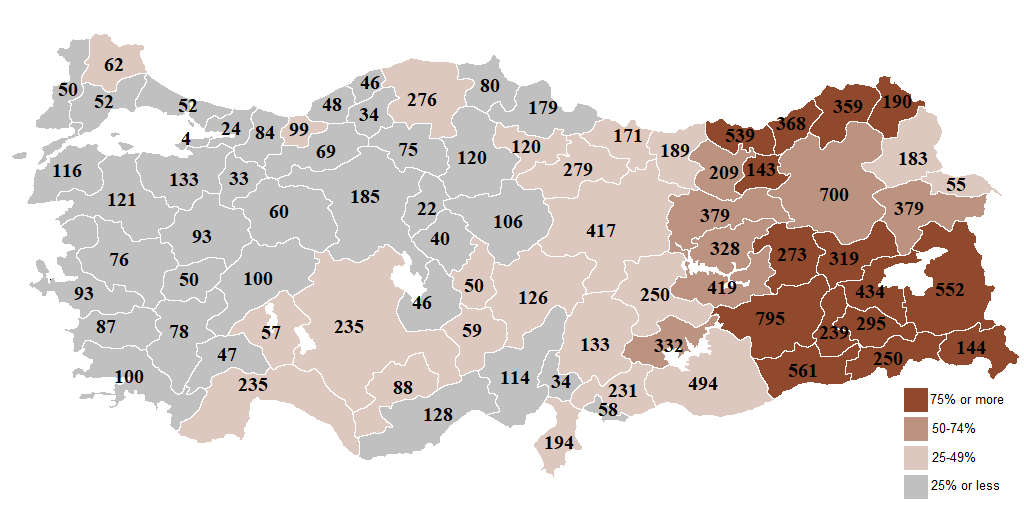
Percentage of geographical name changes in Turkey from 1916 onwards

Mustafa Kemal Atatürk, the leader of the early decades of the Republic, aimed to create a nation state (Turkish: Ulus) from the Turkish remnants of the Ottoman Empire. During the first three decades of the Republic, efforts to Turkify geographical names were a recurring theme. Imported maps containing references to historical regions such as Armenia, Kurdistan, or Lazistan (the official name of the province of Rize until 1921) were prohibited (as was the case with Der Grosse Weltatlas, a map published in Leipzig).

Cultural assimilation into the Turkish culture has been high, and Laz identity was oppressed during the days of Ottoman and Soviet Rule. One of the pivotal moments was in 1992, when the book Laz History (Lazların tarihi) was published. The authors had failed to have it published in 1964.

== Genetics ==
A 2021 study investigating the genetic structure of present-day Caucasian populations also analyzed the genetic profile of the Laz people from Arhavi. The study, which examined 13 samples from Arhavi and a total of 77 samples from across the Caucasus, found that the Arhavi Laz can be modeled as approximately 57.4% Caucasus Hunter-Gatherer (ca. 3700–1700 BCE), 41% Anatolian Neolithic (ca. 2000–1500 BCE), 0.6% Western Steppe Herder (ca. 3300–2600 BCE), and 1.2% Zagros-related ancestry (ca. 1200–830 BCE). According to the study, the populations genetically closest to the Arhavi Laz, in order from closest to most distant, are the Georgian Laz, Hemshin people, Meskhetian Turks, Kakhetian Georgians, Adjarian Georgians, Pontic Greeks, Kartlian Georgians, Turks from Trabzon, Imeretian Georgians, Mingrelians, and Udis.

== See also ==
- Adjarians
- Megrelians
- Pontic Greeks
- Chveneburi
- Chepni people
- Hemshin peoples
- Germakochi
- Didamangisa
- Laz nationalism

== Bibliography ==
- Andrews, Peter (ed.). 1989. Ethnic Groups in the Republic of Turkey. Wiesbaden: Dr. Ludwig Reichert Verlag, pp. 497–501.
- Benninghaus, Rüdiger. 1989. "The Laz: an example of multiple identification". In: Ethnic Groups in the Republic of Turkey, edited by P. Andrews.
- Bryer, Anthony. 1969. "The last Laz risings and the downfall of the Pontic Derebeys, 1812–1840". In: Bedi Kartlisa 26, pp. 191–210.
- Evans, James Allan Stewart (2000). The Age of Justinian: The Circumstances of Imperial Power. London and New York: Routledge. ISBN 978-0-415-23726-0.
- Hewsen, Robert H. (1994). "Laz". In Friedrich, Paul; Diamond, Norma (eds.). Encyclopedia of World Cultures. Vol. 6. New York City: G.K. Hall & Company. pp. 238–241. ISBN 0-8161-1810-8.
- Negele, Jolyon. Turkey: Laz Minority Passive In Face Of Assimilation. Radio Free Europe/Radio Liberty, 25 June 1998.
- Talbert, Richard J. A. (2000). Barrington Atlas of the Greek and Roman World: Map-by-Map Directory. Princeton, New Jersey: Princeton University Press. ISBN 978-0-691-04945-8.
