= Didamangisa =

Figure in Laz mythology

Didamangisa (English: Old witch), is a witch who appears in the mythology of the Laz people. In Laz mythology, there are similar figures considered similar to Didamangisa like Emxuna or Aneneri. Writer Murat Murğulişi has a book called "Didamangisa".

== Description ==
She was usually described as an old witch who kidnaps little children. The Didamangisa was said to reside in cucumber fields which are close to residential area. She attacks children who go to cucumber fields without their parents.
