= Germakochi =

Figure in Laz mythology

Germakochi is a forest man who appears in the mythology of the Laz people. Ochokochi of Georgian mythology is considered equivalent to Germakochi. In ancient times, Laz people would leave their villages if they felt that the Germakochi was in the village.

== Description ==
Germakochi is a tall and hairy figure who lives in the forests. It looks like something between a monkey and a human. Germakochi is a curious character and likes to interact with humans. The way to escape from Germakochi is to make a fire. Germakochi takes the fire and burns instantly. Then, he would run to the Black Sea and jump into it. The Figure is also similar to Kallikantzaros of Anatolian folklore.

== Etymology ==
In the Laz language, germa means "mountain" and kochi means "man". Therefore, the meaning of Germakochi is "man of the mountain".
