= Laz Institute =

- Founded at: Halitağa Caddesi No:32, Kadıköy, Istanbul
- Purpose: Preserving, developing and regenerating Laz culture
- Official language: Laz language and Turkish
- President: İsmail Avcı Bucaklişi
- Website: lazenstitu.com

Laz Institute, is an institute established on May 17, 2013 with the aim of preserving, developing and reproducing the language, culture and history of Laz people. In 2013, with the protocol signed between the Ministry of National Education of the Republic of Turkey and the Laz Institute, training courses were started to be given to Laz language educators. As a result, Laz language was added to the elective courses in the secondary school curriculum of the Ministry of National Education. As a result of the institute's efforts, elective Laz language courses have been given at Boğaziçi University since 2014. Istanbul Bilgi University is another university where elective Laz courses are offered.
