= Kâzım Koyuncu =

Turkish musical artist (1971–2005)

- Also known as: Şair Ceketli Çocuk
- Born: November 7, 1971; Hopa, Artvin, Turkey
- Died: June 25, 2005 (aged 33) Şişli, Istanbul, Turkey
- Genres: Rock, folk rock, Rock and roll
- Occupations: Singer-songwriter, activist
- Years active: 1992–2005
- Formerly of: Zuğaşi Berepe
- Website: www.kazimkoyuncu.net

Kâzım Koyuncu (November 7, 1971 – June 25, 2005) was a Turkish singer-songwriter and activist of Laz origin.

He was born in a village called Yeşilköy, Hopa/Artvin. Koyuncu recorded songs in a number of languages spoken along the northeastern Black Sea coast of Turkey, as well as the language of Laz. He was the founder and singer of Zuğaşi Berepe ("The Children of the Sea"), a folk rock group founded in 1993. Following the group's break-up in 2000, Koyuncu went on to record two solo albums, Viya! in 2001 and Hayde in 2004, which proved to be popular across Turkey and also in Georgia.

He died during treatment for testicular cancer in 2005. Although strongly denied by Health Minister Recep Akdağ, it is popularly thought that the Chernobyl disaster was the cause of Koyuncu's cancer, a sentiment shared by many locals on Turkey's Black Sea coast.

He primarily sang in Laz language and his most famous songs were also in Laz. His albums also contain several songs in Turkish, Georgian and Megrelian.

He fought for nature and was against the construction of a nuclear reactor at Sinop on the northern Black Sea coast of Turkey. He was a well-known activist in environmental and cultural issues. The anniversary of his death is commemorated. According to a review in Daily Sabah in 2015, "Koyuncu's audience is an interesting combination of leftists and environmentalists, rock music seekers and people of Black Sea origin."

== Discography ==
=== with Zuğaşi Berepe ===
- 1995: Va Mişkunan ("We Don't Know" in Laz)
- 1998: İgzas ("You Are Leaving" in Laz)
- 1998: Bruxel Live

=== with Grup Dinmeyen ===
- 1996: Sisler Bulvarı (Boulevard of Mists)

=== Solo albums ===
- 2001: Viya!
- 2004: Hayde
- 2006: Dünyada Bir Yerdeyim (released posthumously)
