= Laz people in Turkey =

Ethnic group in the Republic of Turkey

Laz people in Turkey Türkiye Lazları ლაზეფე თურქონაშე (Lazepe Turkonaşe)
Total population
- 250,000

Regions with significant populations
- native in parts of Artvin and Rize, internal immigrants in Marmara region

Languages
- Laz, Turkish

Religion
- Sunni Islam

The Laz people in Turkey (Turkish: Türkiye Lazları, Laz: ლაზეფე თურქონაშე Lazepe Turkonaşe) are Turkish citizens of Laz descent, an ethnic group native to the eastern Black Sea coast of Turkey and southwestern Georgia.

== Terminology ==
The Turkish public sometimes uses the name "Laz" generally to refer to all inhabitants of Turkey's Black Sea provinces east of Samsun, and the word is often associated with certain social stereotypes. However, the Laz themselves are increasingly keen to differentiate themselves from other inhabitants of these regions. Also, the non-Laz does not want to be called "Laz", preferring to be called Karadenizli ("from the Black Sea region"). The Laz language (Lazca in Turkish) is a Kartvelian language, unrelated to the Black Sea dialect of Turkish language.
