= Sarpi, Georgia =

Sarpi სარფი
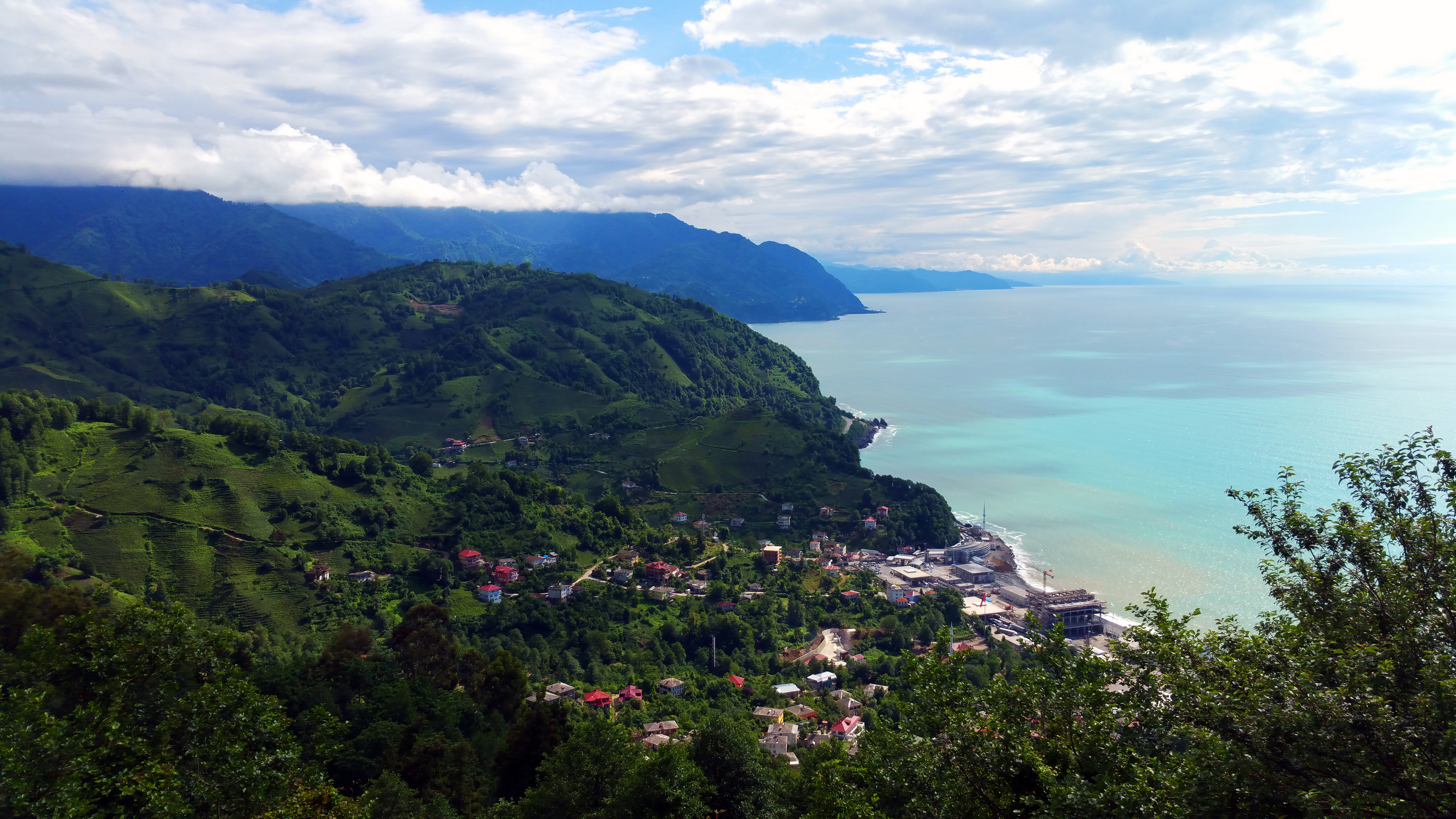

- Location within Georgia
- Coordinates: 41°31′17″N 41°33′07″E
- Country: Georgia
- Region: Adjara
- District: Khelvachauri Municipality

Population (2014)
  - Total: 826
- Time zone: UTC+4

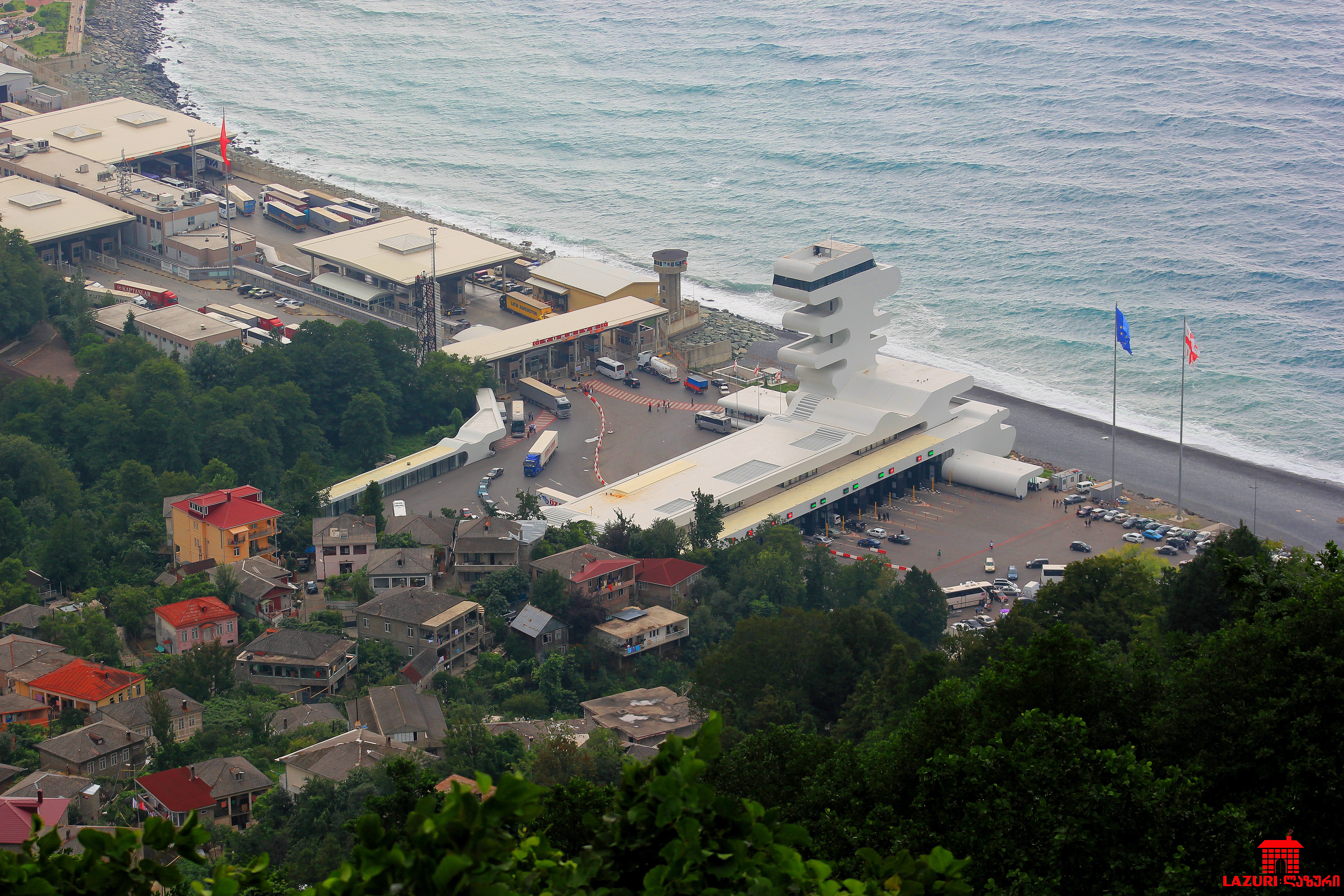
Georgian-Turkish border

Sarpi (Georgian: სარფი; Turkish: Sarp) is a village on the coast of the Black Sea of Georgia, on the border with Turkey. It is inhabited by the Laz.

== Geography ==
Sarpi is the main land border crossing between the two countries and a major conduit for business travel, especially for Turkish companies doing business in Batumi. Sarpi is located about 12 km south of Batumi and about 20 km northeast of Hopa, Turkey.

== Culture ==
An ancient Laz festival called Kolkhoba is held here each year at the end of August or the beginning of September. The myth of Argonauts is performed on stage during the festival.

== See also ==
- Adjara
