= Khelvachauri Municipality =

Coordinates: 41°35′08″N 41°40′08″E

Khelvachauri Municipality ხელვაჩაურის მუნიციპალიტეტი
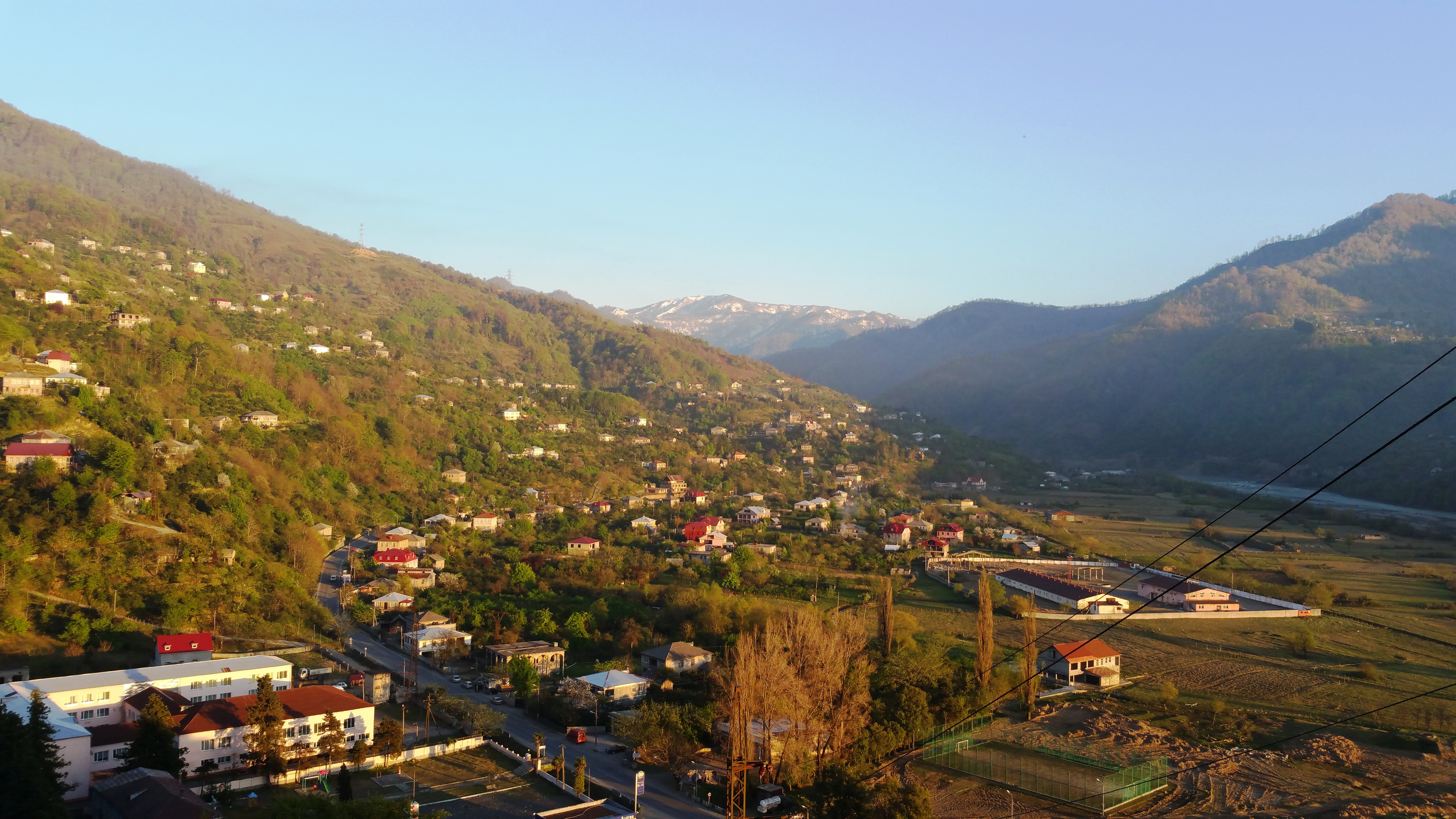
- Khelvachauri Municipality

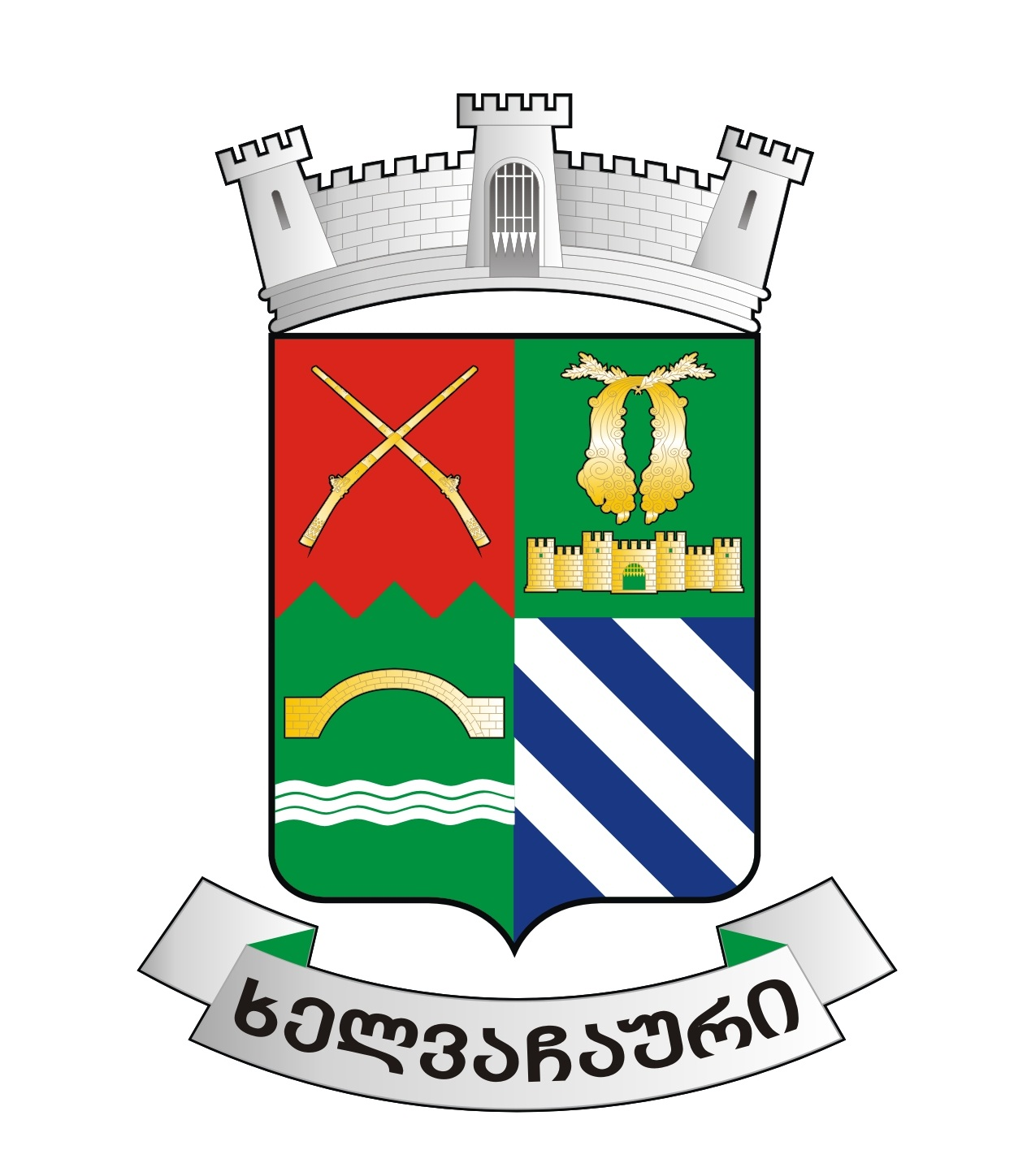
- Flag Seal

- Country: Georgia
- Autonomous Republic: Adjara
- Administrative centre: Khelvachauri

Government
  - Mayor: Zaza Diasamidze (GD)

Area
  - Total: 356.4 km^{2} (137.6 sq mi)

Population (2021)
  - Total: 52,737
  - Density: 148.0/km^{2} (383.2/sq mi)
- Time zone: UTC+4 (Georgian Time)
- Website: khelvachauri.gov.ge

Khelvachauri (Georgian: ხელვაჩაურის მუნიციპალიტეტი, Khelvachauris Municiṕaliťeťi) is a municipality in Georgia's southwestern autonomous republic of Adjara with a population of 52,737 people (2021). The administrative center is the town of Khelvachauri, which is located for the most part within the Batumi municipal boundaries since 2012. The municipality covers an area of 356.4 km^{2} (138 sq mi) and has 64 villages spread over 11 administrative units in the relatively densely populated hills around the city of Batumi.

== Geography ==
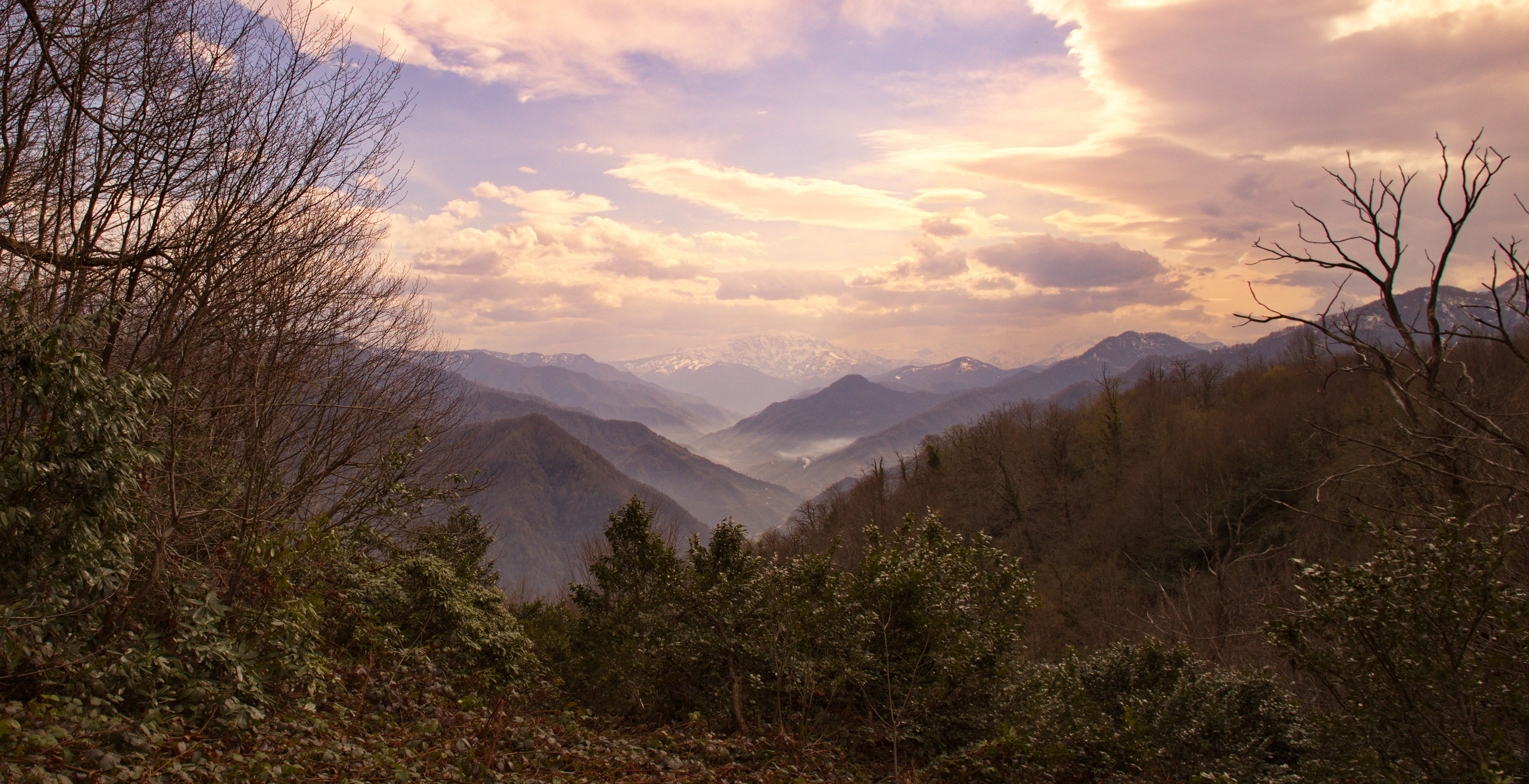
Mountainous interior of Khelvachauri

Khelvachauri is the most southwestern municipality of Georgia and the area has been of great importance due to its strategic location with a rich historical past and a lot of cultural heritage. The modern municipality has 3 kilometers of coastline with the Black Sea in the extreme southwest and borders Turkey in the south. The border crossing at the village of Sarpi on the Black Sea coast is the most important of three Georgian-Turkish border crossings, with 1.36 million incoming foreign travellers in 2019. Furthermore, Khelvachauri borders the municipalities of Keda in the east, Kobuleti in the north, while most of the west side borders Batumi.

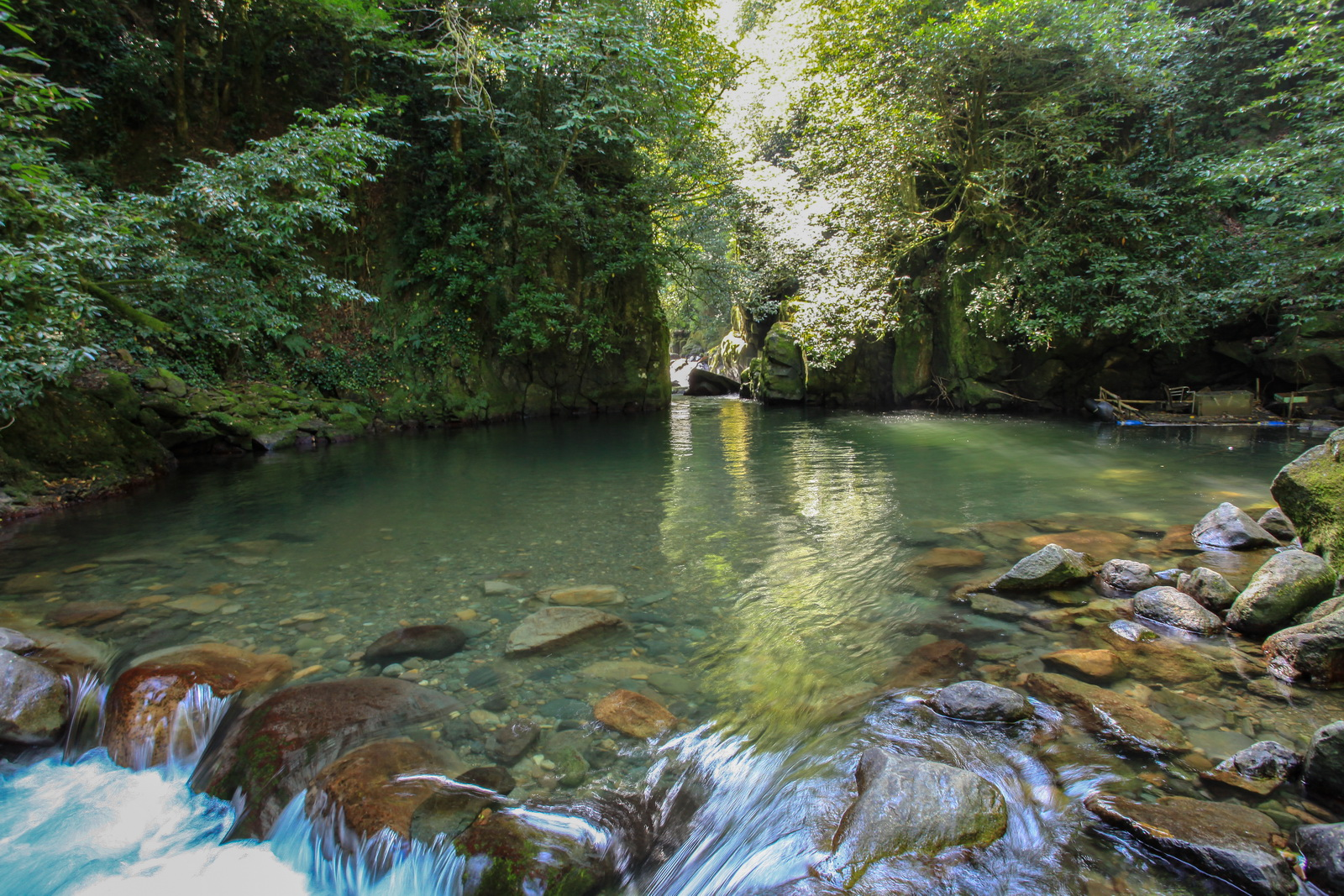
Mtirala National Park

The landscape of the municipality is typical of Adjara: green, humid subtropical hills and mountains. The southern side of the municipality is bisected by the Acharistsqali (literally "river of Adjara") and Machakhlistskali, both of which merge at Khelvachauri with the Chorokhi River from Turkey before reaching the Black Sea. In the north of the municipality lies the western extension of the Meskheti Range and in the borderland with Turkey the Shavsheti Range, both sub-ranges of the Lesser Caucasus.

The highest mountains of the municipality are in the Shavsheti Range, reaching over 2,000 metres (6,600 ft) above sea level, while the Meskheti Range in the northeastern corner of the municipality reaches heights around 1,300 metres (4,300 ft) meters above sea level. This is where the Mtirala National Park is located, whose name is derived from the large amount of rain that falls in the area. It is the wettest area in Georgia. Due to its location directly around Batumi and the natural beauty present in all directions, the municipality also benefits from tourism to the city, and the area is relatively popular among day trippers.

Closer to Batumi, the hills are only a few hundred meters high, where many villages are located. Through this hilly area the Batumi Bypass is under construction, part of the important S2 highway (E70) between Poti and Turkey, to relieve the city of Batumi. Despite the relatively small difference in height near Batumi, the hilly area crammed with villages means that this bypass will consist almost entirely of bridges and tunnels.

== History ==
In the second half of the 19th century, Abkhazian Muhajirs arrived in villages in the current municipality of Khelvachauri, then under Ottoman rule, when the Russian Empire brutally placed the associated principality of Abkhazia under military rule and deported the insurgent population to the Ottoman Empire. Descendants of these still live in the villages of Silabauri, Peria and Mnatobi in the periphery of Batumi.

After the Russian takeover of Adjara in 1878, the territory of the present-day Municipality of Khelvachauri was incorporated into the Batum Oblast until 1917. With the Sovietization of Georgia from 1921, the area was administratively separated in 1924 and it fell successively under Chorokhi Uyezd, Batumi Uyezd (1929), Batumi Raion (1930-1968), Khelvachauri District (1968-2006) and finally from 2006 the Municipality of Khelvachauri.

During the Russo-Georgian War in 2008, several targets in the municipality were bombed by the Russian air force, including a military base that had been handed over by the Russian army a year earlier as part of the agreed departure from Georgia. Until the end of 2007, the Russian 12th Military Base was located in Batumi and Khelvachauri.

Due to border changes in 2009 and 2011, the municipality lost a total of more than 50 km² of territory to Batumi, both to the north, east and south of the city, including an important part of the coastline. This area also included the dabas Makhinjauri and Khelvachauri (the administrative center of the municipality), a dozen villages, but also the famous Batumi Botanical Garden at the Green Cape (Mtsvane Kontskhi) and the historic Fort Gonio and Black Sea beaches at Kvariati.

== Administrative divisions ==
Acharistsqali at the village Acharistsqali

Khelvachauri Municipality is administratively divided into 11 communities (თემი, temi) with 64 villages (სოფელი, sopeli). Since 2012, when Khelvachauri and Makhinjauri were (mostly) absorbed into Batumi city, there are no urban-type settlements (დაბა, daba) in the municipality.

Villages in the municipality include Makho and Sarpi.

== Population ==
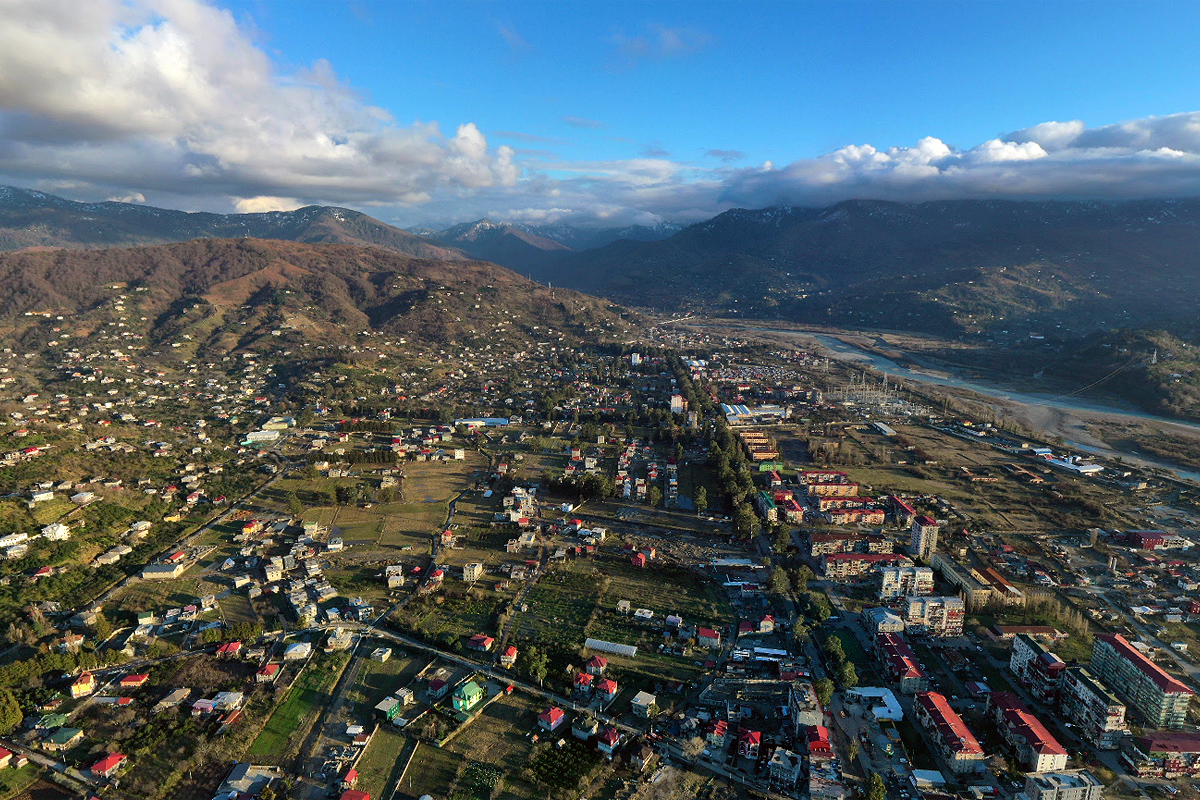
The administrative centre Khelvachauri

The population of Khelvachauri Municipality is 52,737 according to the 2021 estimate, which is a 3% increase compared to the last census of 2014. The municipality lost more than 33,000 residents to the city of Batumi in the period 2009-2011 due to border changes in the relatively densely populated area around Batumi. (Note: See chapter "8. Urbanization", Page 39, footnote 27.) The administrative center Khelvachauri was absorbed for the most part, while Makhinjauri was completely absorbed into Batumi. The population density of the municipality is 148 people per square kilometer.

According to the 2014 census, the population of Khelvachauri consisted of Muslim Georgians at 56.3%, followed by Georgians belonging to the Georgian Orthodox Church (36.4%). Apart from a few dozen followers of the Armenian Apostolic Church, Catholics and a few Jews, no other religious minorities are represented. At 99.2%, the municipality consists almost exclusively of ethnic Georgians. There are small communities of roughly 100 Russians and Armenians and some 50 Abkhazians.

Population Khelvachauri Municipality
	1923	1939	1959	1970	1979	1989	2002	2014	2021
Khelvachauri Municipality (Note: Until 1968 called Batumi District)	-	36,752	42,870	▲61,905	▲71,887	▲83,562	▲90,843	▼51,189	▲52,737
Khelvachauri (Note: Merged with Batumi in 2011)	310	-	-	2,874	▲3,238	▲5,104	▲6,143	-	-
Makhinjauri	979	-	5,931	▼4,421	▼2,768	▲3,702	▼3,401	-	-
Data: Population statistics Georgia 1897 to present. Note: (Note: The 2014 census found an inexplicable gap with the data from the national statistical office Geostat. UN-assisted research has found the 2002 census was inflated by about 8-9 percent. See, "1. Introduction", Page 1.)

== Politics ==
Khelvachauri Municipal Assembly (Georgian: ხელვაჩაურის საკრებულო) is a representative body in Khelvachauri Municipality, consisting of 24 members which are elected every four years. The last election was held in October 2021. Zaza Diasamidze of Georgian Dream was elected mayor.

Party	2017	2021	Current Municipal Assembly
Georgian Dream	17	14	
United National Movement	6	7	
For Georgia		3	
Alliance of Patriots	2		
European Georgia	1		
Total	26	24	

== Transport ==
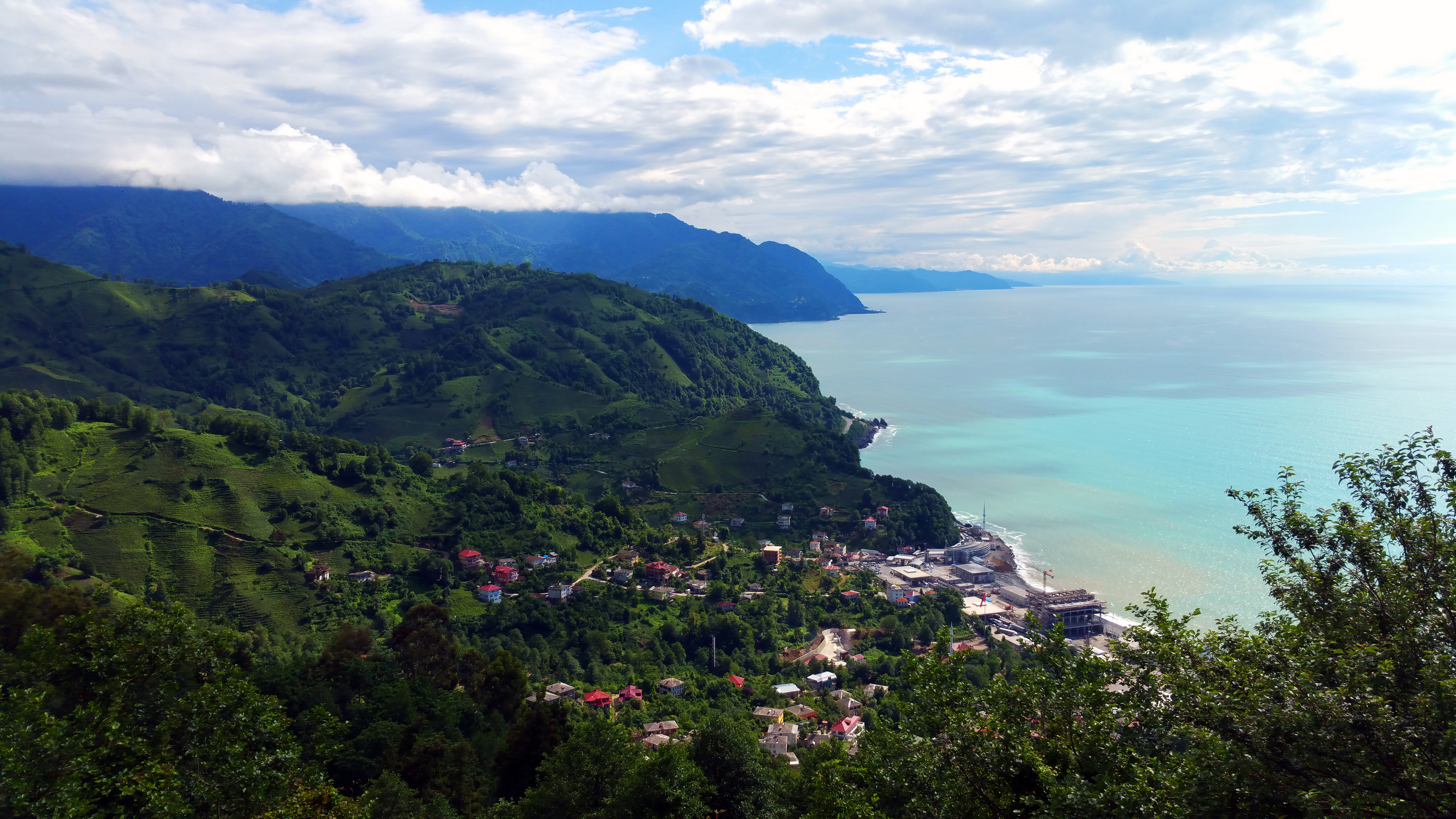
Border town Sarpi crammed at the sea

The Batumi Bypass, part of the important S2 highway (E70) between Poti and Turkey, is under construction in Khelvachauri Municipality to relieve the city of Batumi of through traffic. The S2 terminates in Khelvachauri Municipality at the Georgian-Turkish at the village of Sarpi on the Black Sea coast. This is the most important of three border crossings with Turkey, with 1.36 million incoming foreign travelers in 2019, and the 2nd most popular point of entry into Georgia after Tbilisi airport.

Another important national route passes through Khelvachauri, the Sh1 Batumi - Akhaltsikhe which connects Adjara and Samtskhe-Javakheti across the Goderdzi Pass. Since Makhinjauri is not part of Khelvachauri anymore, the municipality is left without train station. Batumi Central station north of the city is served by long-distance trains to Tbilisi.

Batumi International Airport is the nearest airport, located south of Batumi on the north bank of the Chorokhi river.

== See also ==
- List of municipalities in Georgia (country)
