= Makho =

Makho მახო
- Village
- Location in Georgia
- Coordinates: 41°33′13″N 41°40′14″E
- Country: Georgia
- Region: Adjara
- District: Khelvachauri Municipality
- Elevation: 84 m (276 ft)

Population (2014)
  - Total: 2,479
- Time zone: UTC+04:00 (GET)

Bridge over the river Chorokhi

Makho (Georgian: მახო) is a village in Georgia, situated on the Makho river. It is part of Khelvachauri Municipality. The village is known for it medieval arched bridge.

According to census held in 2014, the population of village was 2 479.

== See also ==
- Adjara
