= Khelvachauri =

Khelvachauri ხელვაჩაური
- Neighborhood of Batumi
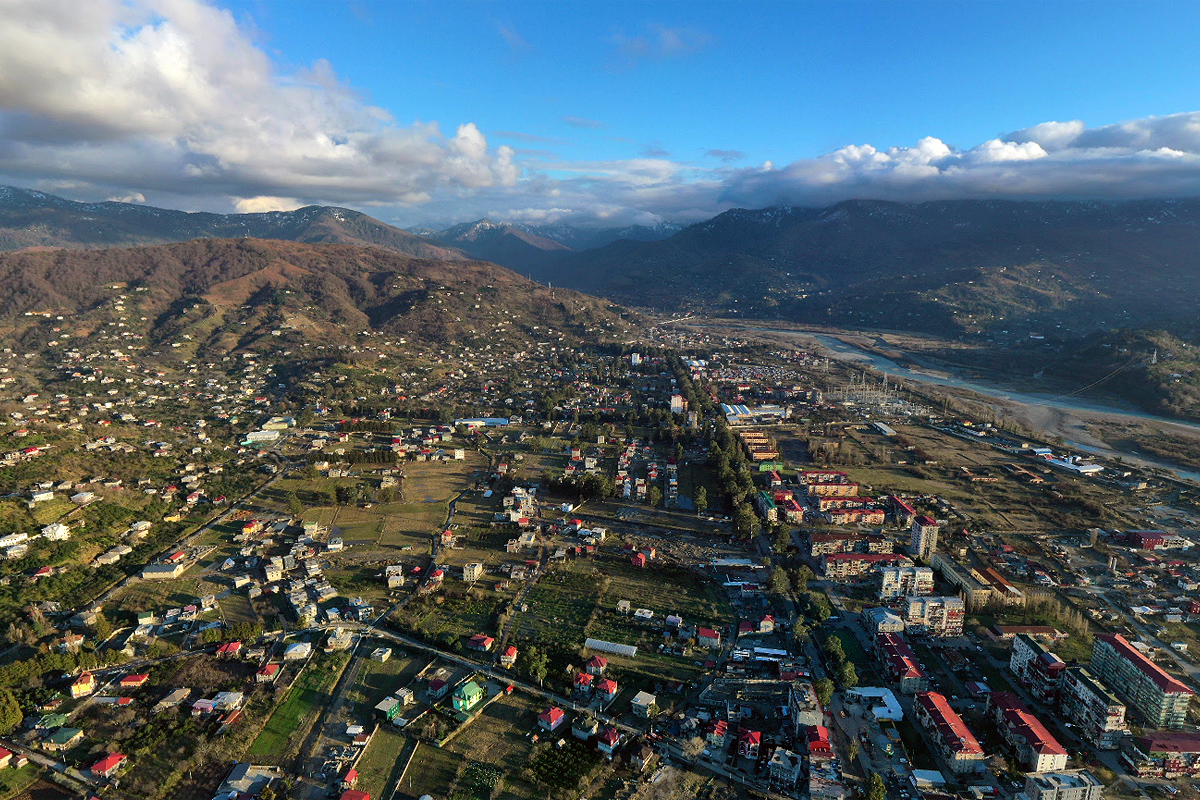

- Location within Georgia Location within Adjara
- Coordinates: 41°35′08″N 41°40′08″E
- Country: Georgia
- Autonomous Republic: Adjara
- Municipality: Batumi
- Elevation: 80 m (260 ft)

Population (2014)
  - Total: 1,085
- Time zone: UTC+4 (Georgian Time)
- Website: khelvachauri.gov.ge

Khelvachauri (Georgian: ხელვაჩაური [χelʷatʃʰauɾi]) is a neighborhood of Batumi in the Autonomous Republic of Adjara in the southwest of Georgia, 8 kilometres (5.0 mi) southeast of the regional capital Batumi and situated on the right bank of the Chorokhi River. Between 1968 and 2011 it was a daba (urban-type settlement), but due to municipal border changes by far most of the town was absorbed into the city municipality of Batumi and Khelvachauri was downgraded to a village.

The territorial transfer also included the locations of the administrative centers of the Municipality of Khelvachauri. This means that Khelvachauri municipality is governed since 2011 from the territory of another municipality, Batumi. The remaining part of Khelvachauri that was left within the Khelvachauri Municipality falls administratively under the Sharabidze community (თემი, temi) of the municipality. Since then, roughly 1,100 people live in the village, which name is derived from the Khelvachadze family. The part annexed by Batumi has a center function for the surrounding villages with administrative, educational and health institutions, and businesses and remains the governing center for Khelvachauri Municipality.

During the Russo-Georgian War in 2008, several targets near Khelvachauri were bombed by the Russian air force, including a military base that had been handed over by the Russian army a year earlier as part of the agreed departure from Georgia. Until the end of 2007, the Russian 12th Military Base was located in Batumi and Khelvachauri.

== Population ==
The 2014 census counted 1,085 residents in the remainder of Khelvachauri. Due to the demotion of the town, it is no longer included in the annually published population statistics of the National Statistical Bureau, Geostat. The population consists almost entirely of Georgians.

	1923	1939	1959	1970	1979	1989	2002	2014
Khelvachauri < 2012	310	-	-	▲2,874	▲3,238	▲5,104	▲6,143	-
Khelvachauri > 2012	-	-	-	-	-	-	1,142	▼1,085
Data: Population statistics Georgia 1897 to present. Note: (Note: The 2014 census found an inexplicable gap with the data from the national statistical office Geostat. UN-assisted research has found the 2002 census was inflated by about 8-9 percent. See, "1. Introduction", Page 1.)

== See also ==
- Adjara
- Batumi
