= Kvariati =

Coordinates: 41°32′43″N 41°33′49″E

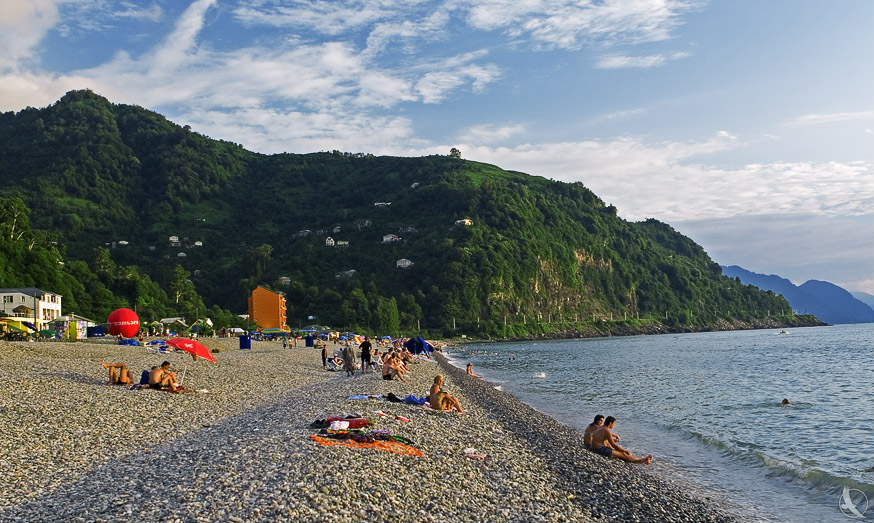
Kvariati beach.

Kvariati (Georgian: კვარიათი) is a village in Georgia, situated on the eastern coast of the Black Sea. It is part of the municipal area of Batumi since 2011 and a seaside resort, visited annually by Georgians and many former Soviet Union residents. It is inhabited by the Laz subgroup of Georgians.

According to census held in 2002, the population of the village was 98.

== See also ==
- Adjara
