= Mehr =

Mehr or Mihr may refer to:

== Persian names ==
- Mehr, an alternative name for Mithra, a Zoroastrian divinity
- Mehr (month), the seventh month of the year and the sixteenth day of the month of the Iranian and Zoroastrian calendars
- Mehr's day, or Mehregan, the Zoroastrian/Iranian festival celebrated in honor of Mehr/Mithra

== People ==
- Mehr (name)
- Mihr (name)
- House of Mihran, a Parthian clan and an Armenian king

== Places ==
- Mehr, alternate spelling of Mohr, Fars, a city in Iran
- Kabud Mehr, a village in Iran
- Mehr, Ilam, a village in Ilam Province, Iran
- Mehr-e Olya, a village in Markazi Province, Iran
- Mehr-e Sofla, a village in Markazi Province, Iran
- Mehr, Razavi Khorasan, a village in Razavi Khorasan Province, Iran
- Mehrabad International Airport in Tehran
- Darb-e Mehr, Mithra's court, an alternate name for a Zoroastrian fire temple
- Mihrimah Mosque, an Ottoman mosque located just inside the Edirnekapı District on the Walls of Istanbul, Turkey
- Mihrimah Sultan Mosque (Üsküdar), an Ottoman mosque in the historic center of the Üsküdar municipality, Istanbul, Turkey
- Mihr, an Iranian village said to have once been the site of Adur Burzen-Mihr, one of the legendary Great Fires of Zoroastrianism
- Mihr's foot, another name for the Pamir Mountains
- Mehr, a district of Rees, Germany

== Other ==
- Mehr News Agency (MNA), an Iranian news service established in 2003

== See also ==
- Aryamehr, a secondary title of the former shah
- Mah (disambiguation)
- Mahr, a gift given by the husband to the wife in Muslim marriages
- Mehra, an Indian surname
- Meher (disambiguation)
- Mehar (disambiguation)
- Mehran (disambiguation)
- Mihira (disambiguation)
- Mer (disambiguation)
- Mehrdad, a Persian name
- Myrrh (disambiguation)
