= Mahar (disambiguation) =

Mahar is an Indian caste group.

Mahar may also refer to:

- Mahar (Pellucidar), a fictional species of reptile in Edgar Rice Burroughs' Pellucidar
- Mahar (surname), a Kumaoni-Khastriya Rajput surname used in Uttrakhand, Himachal Pradesh and West Nepal
- Mahar (tribe), a Sindhi tribe in Pakistan
- Mahar, an anglicization of the Irish surname Ó Meachair
- Mahar, the original name of the Israeli political party Democratic Choice
- Mahr, a gift given from a groom to a bride in an Islamic wedding ceremony
- MAHAR, an acronym for Malaysian Humanitarian Aid and Relief

== See also ==
- Meher (disambiguation)
- Mahara (disambiguation)
