= Mithras (disambiguation) =

Mithras is the god central to the Greco-Roman mystery religion of Mithraism.

Mithras may also refer to:

- Mithras (butterfly), a genus of butterfly in the family Lycaenidae
- Mithras (name)
- Mithra (actor), Indian film actor

== See also ==
- Mythras (disambiguation)
- Mitra (disambiguation)
- Mithridates (disambiguation)
- Mehran (disambiguation)
- Mihira (disambiguation)
- Mithra, a Zoroastrian deity, the origin of the Greco-Roman Mithras
- Mythra (Xenoblade Chronicles 2)
