= Pasdaran (district) =

Neighbourhood in Tehran, Iran

Coordinates: 35°45′56″N 51°27′12″E

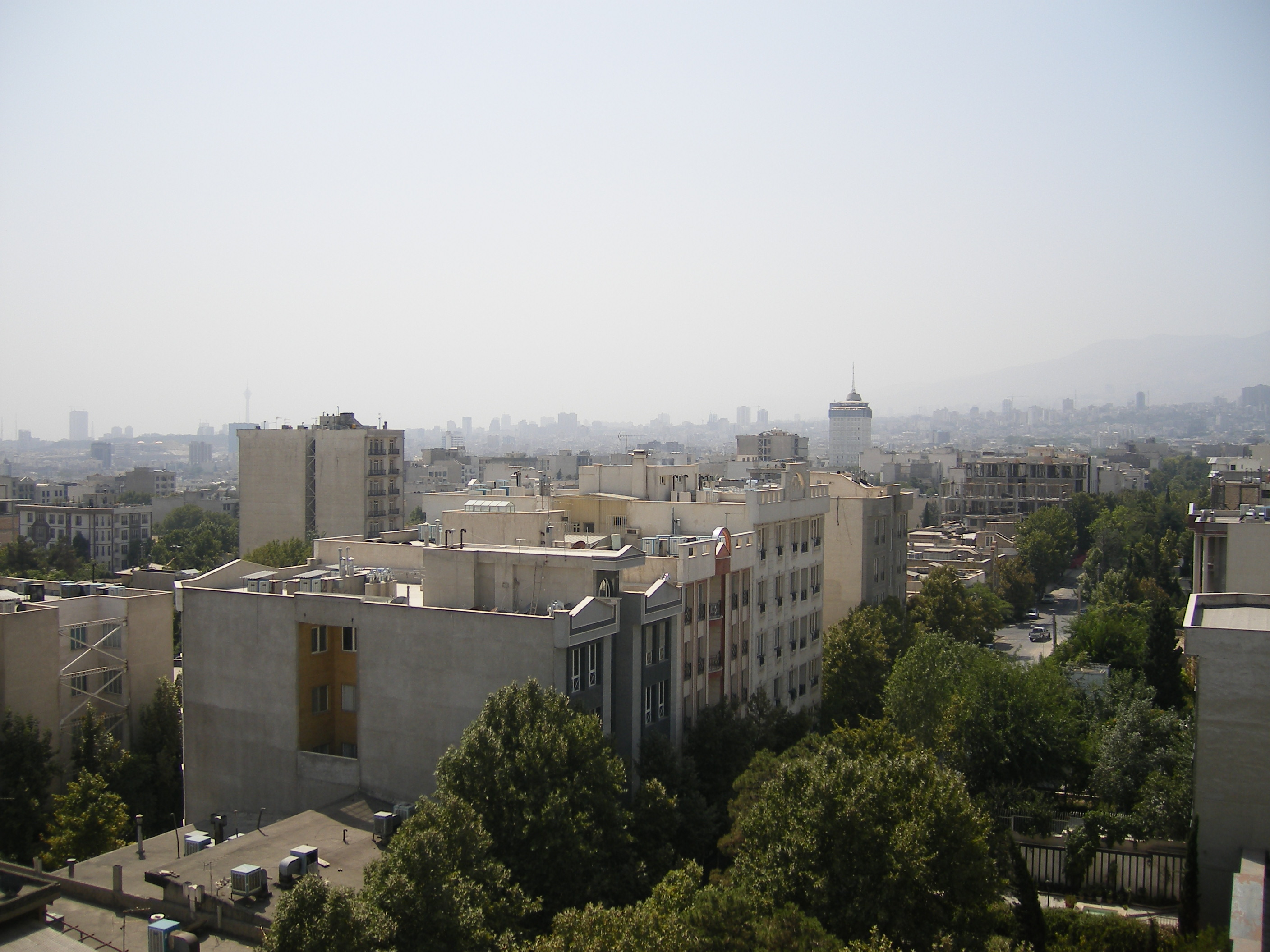
A view of Pasdaran with Borj-e Sefid far in the background

Pasdaran (Persian: پاسداران) is a neighbourhood of northern Tehran centered on Pasdaran Avenue. This avenue connects Niavaran avenue (from the north) to Shariati avenue (in the south). It is about 8–9 km long and is a major commercial thoroughfare for northern Tehran together with northern parts of two other long streets: Valiasr Street and Shariati Street.

Pasdaran in Persian means "guardians". Prior to the 1979 Iranian Revolution this neighbourhood was known as Saltanat Abad (سلطنت آباد), which means "built by the monarchy", and refers to the palace of the Shah (Mohammad Reza Pahlavi), situated at the northernmost tip of this street.

Pasdaran Ave., along with the network of streets that extend out from it, make up the Pasdaran Neighbourhood of Tehran, which includes areas like Farmanieh, Darrous, Rostam Abad, Saltanat Abad, Zarrabkhaneh, Mehran, Ekhtiarieh, Ehteshamiyeh, Doulat, Dibaji, and Chizar.

Although business and commerce is part of a trend towards increasing urbanity in the district (mainly witnessed along the district's northern edge near Farmanieh), the majority of the area's housing remains relatively suburban in nature, consisting mostly of mansions (often stereotypically Persian) and townhouses or duplexes.

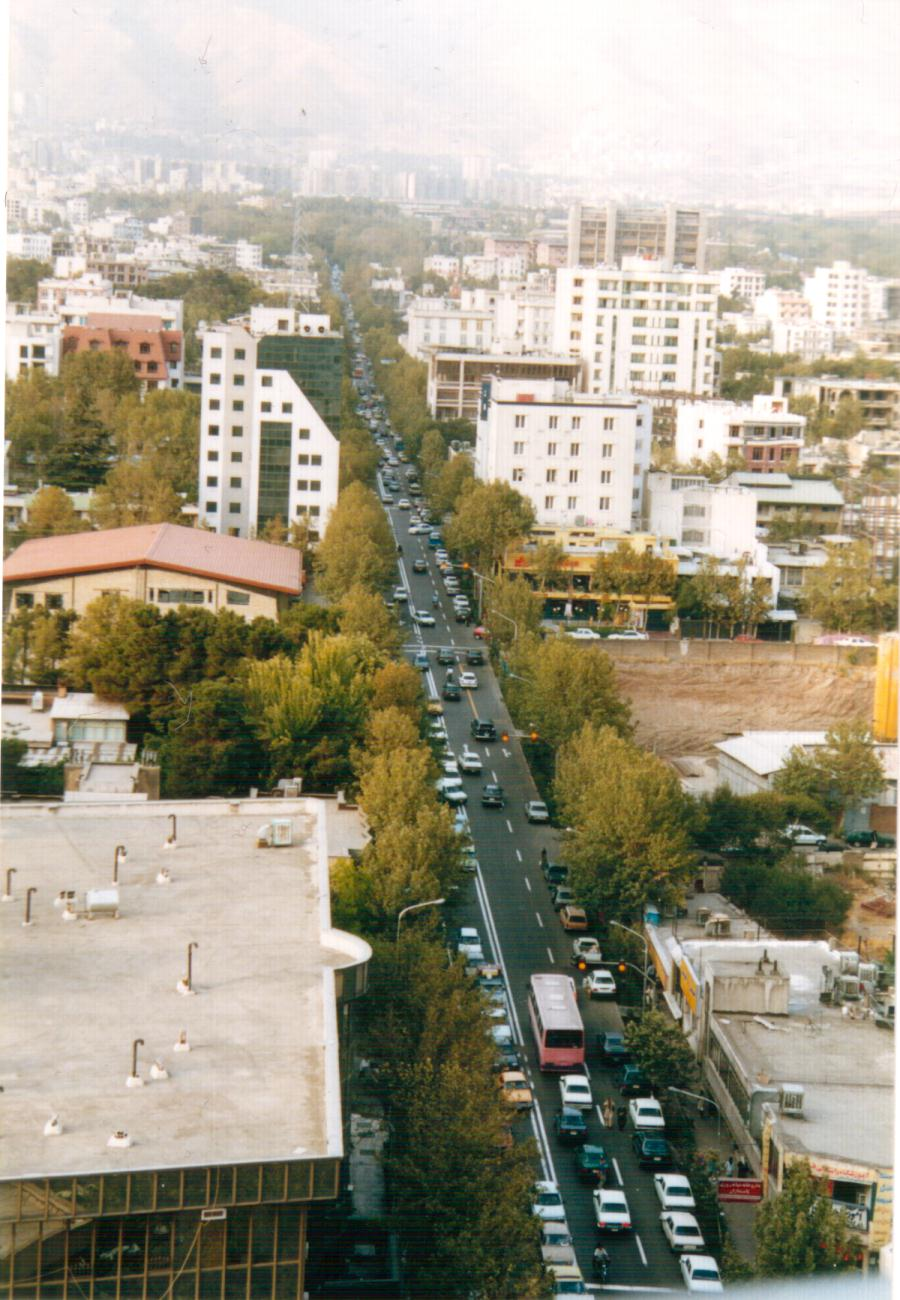
Pasdaran Ave. seen from the top of Borj-e Sefid (The White Tower)

== Borj-e Sefid ==
The Borj-e Sefid (meaning 'White Tower') is a skyscraper built along Pasdaran Ave. within which is contained a fashionable shopping center as well as offices. The tower has cemented Pasdaran's status as an attractive, upscale suburb of Tehran, raising the area's profile and spurring a series of developments in the surrounding areas.
