= Mitra (disambiguation) =

Mitra is an Indo-Iranian deity.

Mitra or Mithra may also refer to:

== Indo-Iranian deities ==
- Mithra (Persian: Mitra), a Zoroastrian yazata
- Mitra (Vedic) (Sanskrit: Mitrá-, Mitráḥ), a deity who appears frequently in the ancient Indian text of the Rigveda
  - Mitra–Varuna, dual deities in the Rigveda

== Biology ==
- Mitra (gastropod), a genus of Neogastropod snail named for the episcopal mitre
  - Mitra mitra, the episcopal miter
- Acmaea mitra, the whitecap limpet
- Seychelles crow (Euploea mitra), a nymphalid butterfly

== People ==
- Mitra (surname)
- Mitra (given name)
- Mithra (actor)

== Places ==
- La Mitra, a town in the Panamá province of Panama
- Cerro de las Mitras ("Miter Hill" or "Miter Mountain"), a mountain in Nuevo León, Mexico
- Colonias Mitras Centro, Mitras Norte and Mitras Sur, neighborhoods in Monterrey, Nuevo León, Mexico
  - Mitras (Monterrey Metro) (aka Estación Mitras), a station on the Line 1 of the Monterrey Metro

== Other uses ==
- Mitra (Conan), a deity in Robert E. Howard's Hyborian Age stories
- Mitra (crater), a crater on the Moon named for Sisir Kumar Mitra
- Mitra (film), a 2021 Dutch film
- 4486 Mithra, a near-Earth asteroid
- Mitra 15, a minicomputer from French company Compagnie Internationale pour l’Informatique
- MITRA Youth Buddhist Network, a network of youth Buddhist organizations in Australia
- Movement against Intimidation, Threat and Revenge against Activists, an advocacy group in Mumbai, India
- Operazione Mitra, a 1951 Italian film
- PS Mitra Kukar, an Indonesian football club
- Volkswagen Mitra, another name for the Volkswagen EA489 Basistransporter
- Mitro Bahini or Mitra Vahini, Indian and Bangladeshi forces in the Bangladesh Liberation War and the Indo-Pakistani war of 1971
- Mitra (social network), a Mastodon (social network) compatible lightweight Fediverse server written in Rust.
- Wuling Mitra EV, a rebadged Wuling Yangguang electric van marketed by SGMW Motor Indonesia in the Indonesian market

== See also ==
- Mitra dynasty (disambiguation)
- Mithras (disambiguation)
- Mithridates (disambiguation)
- Mehran (disambiguation)
- Mihira (disambiguation)
- Mitre (disambiguation)
