= Meherzad =

Mehrzad
- Gender: Male

Origin
- Origin: Iran

Other names
- Related names: Meher, Meherazad, Mehr, Meherabad, Mehrdad

Mehrzad or Meherzad (Persian: مهرزاد | Avestan: Miθra) is an Avestan name which has a meaning related to the Yazata Mithra. Mehr (مهر) means "sun" and zād (زاد) means "born of". So the literal meaning of Mehrzād (مهرزاد) is born of sun.

== See also ==
- Mehr (name)
- Meher (disambiguation)
- Meherazad
