= Mihret =

Male given name

- Gender: Male

Other gender
- Feminine: Mihreta

Origin
- Meaning: Sun

Other names
- Related names: Mihr, Mihri

Mihret is a male given name and surname.

In the Balkans, Mihret is popular among Bosniaks in the former Yugoslav nations. The name comes from the Persian word "mihri" (مهرى), which translates to "sun-like" and is derived from "mehr" (مهر), which translates to "sun." The female equivalent to the name is Mihreta.

== Given name ==
- Mihret Topčagić (born 1988), Bosnian footballer

== Surname ==
- Tewodros Mihret, Ethiopian lawyer and academic

== See also ==
- Kidane Mihret River
