= Thokdar =

In feudal India, Thokdar, also known as Sayana, was a hereditary title held by those responsible for revenue collection within administrative units called parganas. Thokdars acted as intermediaries between central authorities and local village-level administration, ensuring efficient collection of taxes and dues.

== System structure ==
Within the parganas, Thokdars appointed Padhans, who managed village-level revenue collection. In some areas, they held significant authority, shaping local administrative and social structures.

== Role and responsibilities ==
Thokdars were primarily responsible for:

- Revenue collection: They supervised and collected revenue from the villages under their jurisdiction, often through appointed village-level officers called Padhans.
- Offerings and entitlements: Thokdars received nazrana (offerings) from the villages during festivals, family ceremonies, and other occasions. They were also entitled to a portion of certain local resources, such as a leg of every goat killed during communal or religious festivals in their divisions.
- Land rights: Thokdars enjoyed portions of rent-free land in their own villages and exercised significant influence over local land-related matters.
- Hereditary status: The title of Thokdar was hereditary, passing down within families across generations.

== Thokdar surnames ==
- Bisht
- Negi
- Mahar
