= Mithridates =

Mithridates /ˌmɪθrɪˈdeɪtiːz/ or Mithradates /ˌmɪθrəˈdeɪtiːz/ (Old Persian 𐎷𐎡𐎰𐎼𐎭𐎠𐎫 Miθradāta) is the Hellenistic form of an Iranian theophoric name, meaning "given by Mithra". Its Modern Persian form is Mehrdad. It may refer to:

== Rulers ==
- Of Cius (also known as Kios)
  - Mithridates of Cius (d. 363 BC)
  - Mithridates II of Cius (r. 337–302 BC)
  - Mithridates III of Cius (r. c. 301 BC) (became Mithridates I of Pontus, for whom see below)
- Of Pontus
  - Mithridates I of Pontus (r. c. 281–266 BC), originally Mithridates III of Cius and also called Mithridates I Ctistes, founder of the Kingdom of Pontus
  - Mithridates II of Pontus (r. c. 250–220 BC)
  - Mithridates III of Pontus (r. c. 220–185 BC)
  - Mithridates IV of Pontus (r. c. 170–150 BC), full name Mithridates Philopator Philadelphus
  - Mithridates V Euergetes (r. c. 150–120 BC)
  - Mithridates VI Eupator (r. c. 120–63 BC), also known as Mithridates the Great, after whom the Mithridatic Wars, Mithridate (Racine), and several stage works are named
- Of Parthia
  - Mithridates I of Parthia (r. 171–132 BC) also known as Mithridates I the Great
  - Mithridates II of Parthia (r. 124–88 BC) also known as Mithridates the Great
  - Mithridates III of Parthia (r. 87–80 BC)
  - Mithridates IV of Parthia (r. 57–54 BC)
  - Mithridates V of Parthia (r. 129–140 AD)
  - Meherdates of Parthia (r. 49-51 AD) successor of Vonones I
- Of Commagene
  - Mithridates I Callinicus (r. 109–70 BC)
  - Mithridates II of Commagene (r. 38–20 BC), full name Mithridates II Antiochus Epiphanes Philorhomaeus Philhellen Monocrites
  - Mithridates III of Commagene (r. 20–12 BC), full name Mithridates III Antiochus Epiphanes
- Of Media Atropatene
  - Mithridates I of Media Atropatene (r. 67–66 BC)
- Of the Bosporus
  - Mithridates II of the Bosporus (r. 47-46 BC), also known as Mithridates of Pergamon
  - Tiberius Julius Mithridates, (r. 39–44/45 AD, d. 68 AD), also known as Mithridates III of the Bosporus, 1st-century Roman client king
- Of Armenia
  - Mithridates of Armenia (r. 35–51 AD)
- Of Iberia
  - Mihrdat I of Iberia (r. 58–106 AD)
  - Mihrdat II of Iberia (r. 249–265 AD)
  - Mihrdat III of Iberia (r. c. 365–380 AD)
  - Mihrdat IV of Iberia (r. c. 409–411 AD)
  - Mihrdat V of Iberia (r. c. 435–447 AD)
- Of Colchis
  - Mithridates of Colchis (fl. 83 BC)

== Other people ==
- Mithridates (Persian general) (d. 334 BC), son-in-law of Darius III
- Mithridates (nephew of Antiochus III)
- Mitradates, according to Herodotus a Median herdsman, who was ordered to murder the future Cyrus the Great by his grandfather Astyages, but who secretly raised him with his wife Cyno until the age of ten, having passed off their own stillborn child as the murdered Cyrus.
- Mithridates Chrestus, prince from the Kingdom of Pontus, brother of Mithridates VI of Pontus
- Flavius Mithridates, 15th-century Italian Jewish translator
- Mithredath, or Mithridates, two minor Hebrew Bible figures

== Other uses ==
- Mithridate, semi-mythical antidote named for Mithridates VI of Pontus
- Mithridatism, the practice of taking repeated low doses of a poison with the intent of building immunity to it, attributed to Mithridates VI of Pontus
- Epistula Mithridatis, a letter allegedly written by Mithridates VI of Pontus (assigned to Sallust)
- Mithridate (Racine), 1673 play by Jean Racine based on Mithridates VI of Pontus
  - Mitridate Eupatore, 1707 opera by Alessandro Scarlatti, based on Mithridates VI of Pontus
  - Mitridate (Porpora), 1730 opera by Porpora
  - Mitridate, re di Ponto, 1770 opera by Wolfgang Amadeus Mozart, based on Racine's play
- Mithridates, de differentiis linguarum[...], a book with 22 translations of the Lord's Prayer collected by Conrad Gessner.

== See also ==
- Mithras (disambiguation)
- Mitra (disambiguation)
- Mithridates the Great (disambiguation)
