= Reyhaneh Sariri =

Iranian professor, chemist, scientist and inventor

Reyhaneh Sariri (born January 17, 1953) is an Iranian scientist, professor, and inventor.

Sariri taught chemistry at the University of Gilan and won The 2008 British Royal Society of Chemistry Award for her paper "on “Study of Antioxidant Effect of Fruits and Vegetables Special to Gilan.” Sariri has published seven books and presented 148 papers at national and international conferences.
