= Cedrus Residential =

Apartment building in Tehran, Iran

- مسکونی سدروس
- Interactive map of the Cedrus Residential area

General information
- Type: Residential
- Architectural style: Contemporary architecture
- Location: Darrous neighborhood, Sa'adat Abad area on Morvarid Street, Tehran, Iran
- Coordinates: 35.689444°N 51.389722°E
- Completed: 2018

Technical details
- Material: Concrete, steel, wood
- Floor count: 14
- Floor area: 6,000 m^{2} (65,000 sq ft)

Design and construction
- Architect: Alireza Taghaboni
- Architecture firm: Next Office
- Developer: NEXA Group
- Engineer: Imen Sazeh Fadak Co.
- Structural engineer: S. Fallahi
- Known for: Layered balconies and an open floor

Other information
- Parking: Ground floor

Cedrus Residential also known as the Cedrus Dream Garden Tower is a residential building in Tehran. The contemporary building is located in the wealthy area of Sa'adat Abad and features a facade of staggered and walled balconies. In 2019 the building won first prize at the World Architecture Festival in the "Completed Building Housing category".

== Background ==
The building was designed by Tehran-based architect Alireza Taghaboni of Next Office. The architect designed the building to deal with the overcrowding in Tehran. The building is located district 3 in Sa'adat Abad, which is considered a developed and wealthy area or Tehran.

== Design ==
The design uses layered balconies and open floor plans. The building is made from brick. The design of the balconies was an effort to accommodate the private and public life of the occupants. The building is 14 stories tall: three floors below ground, and eleven above. The third floor has a game room, a pool, a sauna, and a Jacuzzi. The uppermost floor has access to a garden which is 169 square metres (1,820 sq ft).

== Reception ==
In 2019 the building won first prize at the World Architecture Festival in the "Completed Building Housing category".
