= Pasdaran =

Pasdaran may refer to:

- Pasdaran (district) in Tehran, Iran
- Pasdaran ('Guardians'), informal name of Islamic Revolutionary Guard Corps in Iran
