= Mehran (name) =

Mehran (Persian: مهران, lit. 'kind, sun') is a given name and surname of Persian origin.

== Given name ==
- Mehran Ghassemi (1977–2008), Iranian journalist
- Mehran Maham (born 1969), Iranian film producer
- Mehran Marri (born 1973), Pakistani separatist militant
- Mehran Modiri (born 1967), Iranian filmmaker, actor, singer
- Mehran Mumtaz (born 2003), Pakistani cricketer
- Mehran Karimi Nasseri (1945–2022), Iranian refugee who lived in Charles de Gaulle Airport from 1988 until 2006
- Mehran Rajabi (born 1961), Iranian actor
- Mehran Sahami (born 1970), Iranian-born American computer scientist

== Surname ==
- Alireza Mehran, Iranian academic, former chancellor of Sharif University of Technology
- Hassan Ali Mehran (born 1937), Iranian economist
- Laleh Mehran (born 1968), Iranian-born American new media artist
- Mark Whitney Mehran, American businessman
- Marsha Mehran (1977–2014), Iranian novelist
- Roxana Mehran, Iranian-born American cardiologist
- Sam Mehran (1985–2018), American-Australian musician, songwriter, and producer

== See also ==
- Mehran (disambiguation)
