= Guyim Vault House =

Residential concept-home in Iran

- خانه طاقی گویوم
- Guyim Vault House

General information
- Type: Residential
- Architectural style: Contemporary architecture
- Location: Fars province, Guyim, Shiraz, Iran
- Client: Farhad Vafa

Technical details
- Structural system: Bastanpol Co.
- Floor count: 2
- Floor area: 1385 square meters

Design and construction
- Architect: Alireza Taghaboni
- Architecture firm: Next Office
- Structural engineer: Bastanpol company
- Awards: "House Future Project" World Architecture Festival
- Known for: Dome shapes

Guyim Vault House is a two level residential concept-home which features dome shapes which utilize Chahartaq design elements. The home uses cubed sections which are fashioned in the shape of domes to create separate areas. The home was a winner of the "House Future Project" award at the 2018 World Architecture Festival.

== Background ==
The plan for the home was to blur the lines between the home's interior and exterior. The home was designed as contemporary architecture with traditional Iranian architecture elements. It was designed making use of the chartaqi style which is a system of arches used in many Iranian structures.

== Design ==
The home was designed by Tehran based architect Alireza Taghaboni of Next Office. The overall design is based on a system of cross-arched domes chartaqi. The design element uses domes instead of cubes to create separate areas. The domes and half-domes create separate areas which are both closed and semi-closed.

There are two levels of the house consisting of domed sections which create the interior space of the home. The kitchen, the guest room, and an open area are found on the first floor. There is also a central courtyard which is sunken in order to provide privacy for the first floor spaces.

The home is engineered using a Chahartaqi structural system which has the weight of the home supported by footings. The structure is a designed as a system of cubes, in the shape of half domes.

== Reception ==
In 2018 the concept-home was entered in the World Architecture Festival and won the "House Future Project" award. Charles Sturt University's Dr Sam Bowker, (art history and visual culture) compared the Guyim Vault House to the Ludwig Mies van der Rohe designed Farnsworth House in Illinois.

Kate Jones, writing for Domain, compared the dome shapes of the home's design to a spaceship.
