= Mythras =

The name Mythras may refer to:

- Mithras, the great god at the centre of the Roman mystery religion Mithraism
- Mythras, a re-branding of the sixth edition tabletop role-playing game RuneQuest

== See also ==
- Mithras (disambiguation)
