= Mehran =

Mehran (Persian: مهران) is derived from the term mehr (English: sun), relating to Mithra, an ancient Zoroastrian Persian deity.

Mehran may refer to:

== Places ==
=== Iran ===
- Mehran (district), a neighborhood of northern Tehran, capital of Iran
- Mehran, Alborz, a village in Alborz Province
- Mehran, Ilam, a city in Ilam Province
- Mehran County, Ilam Province
- Mehran District, Hormozgan Province
- Mehran Rural District, Hormozgan Province

=== Pakistan ===
- Mehran, a name for Sindh province in Pakistan
- Gulshan-e-Mehran, a suburb of Karachi, Pakistan
- Mehran Town, Korangi Industrial Area, Karachi, Sindh
- PNS Mehran, a naval base in Pakistan

== Rivers ==
- Mehran River, in Hormozgan Province, Iran
- Mehran River, another name for the Komur River, a tributary of the Aji Chai in Iran
- Mehran River, a local name for the Indus River in Sindh, Pakistan

== Other ==
- Mithras (disambiguation)
- Mihira (disambiguation)
- Mehr (disambiguation)
- Meher (disambiguation)
- Mehar (disambiguation)
- Mehran (name)
- Mehran, is a character in the Persian epic poem Shahnameh
- Mehran (magazine), Pakistan
- Mehran Force, a defunct Pakistan paramilitary organization
- Mehran Highway, in Sindh, Pakistan
- Mehran University of Engineering & Technology, in Jamshoro, Sindh, Pakistan
- Battle of Mehran, a 1986 battle in the Iran-Iraq War
- Daily Mehran, a daily newspaper in Sindh, Pakistan
- House of Mehran, an Iranian noble family
- Suzuki Mehran, an economic car manufactured and marketed by Suzuki in Pakistan
