= Mehar =

Mehar may refer to:

- Mehar (name)
- Mehar Tehsil, an administrative division of Dadu District, Sindh, Pakistan
- Mehar, Pakistan a city in Sindh province of Pakistan

== See also ==
- Mehr (disambiguation)
- Meher (disambiguation)
- Mehran (disambiguation)
- Mihira (disambiguation)
