= Meher =

Meher may refer to:

== People ==
- Danthala Venkata Meher Baba (1950–2008), an Indian cricketer
- Gangadhar Meher (1862–1924), an Indian poet
- Gurubari Meher, a martyr in the Indian independence movement against Britain
- Jayanta Meher (born 1986), an Indian painter
- Jog Meher Shrestha, a Nepalese politician
- Meher Ali Shah (1859–1937), a Muslim scholar of the Chishti Order of Sufism
- Meher Baba (1894–1969), an Indian spiritual leader
- Meher Bukhari (born in 1984), a journalist and a television host from Pakistan
- Mehar Mittal (born 1935), an Indian comedian
- Meher Ramesh, an Indian film director
- Kailash Chandra Meher (born 1954), an Indian painter
- Kersi Meher-Homji, an Australian journalist
- Sadhu Meher, an Indian actor, director, and producer

== Media ==
- Meher (TV series), a television series in India

== Places ==
- Méhers, a commune in France
- Meher Mount, a spiritual retreat center in Ojai, California dedicated to Meher Baba
- Meher Pilgrim Center, a spiritual retreat in India dedicated to Meher Baba
- Meher Spiritual Center, a spiritual center in the U.S. dedicated to Meher Baba

== Other uses ==
- Gangadhar Meher College (Autonomous), Sambalpur, a college in India
- Mahr, also spelled meher, a payment given by the husband to the wife in Muslim marriages
- Meherzad, a Zoroastrian name which is related to the Yazata Mithra.

== See also ==
- Mehr (disambiguation)
- Mehar (disambiguation)
- Mehran (disambiguation)
- Mihira (disambiguation)
- Mahar (disambiguation)
