= Mahara =

Mahara may refer to:

- Mahara, Sri Lanka, a town in Sri Lanka
  - Mahara Electoral District (1960–1989)
- Mahara (surname)
- Mahara (software), an open source electronic portfolio system

== See also ==
- Mahari (disambiguation)
- Mahar (disambiguation)
- Mahra (disambiguation)
