= Alireza Taghaboni =

Iranian architect (born 1977)

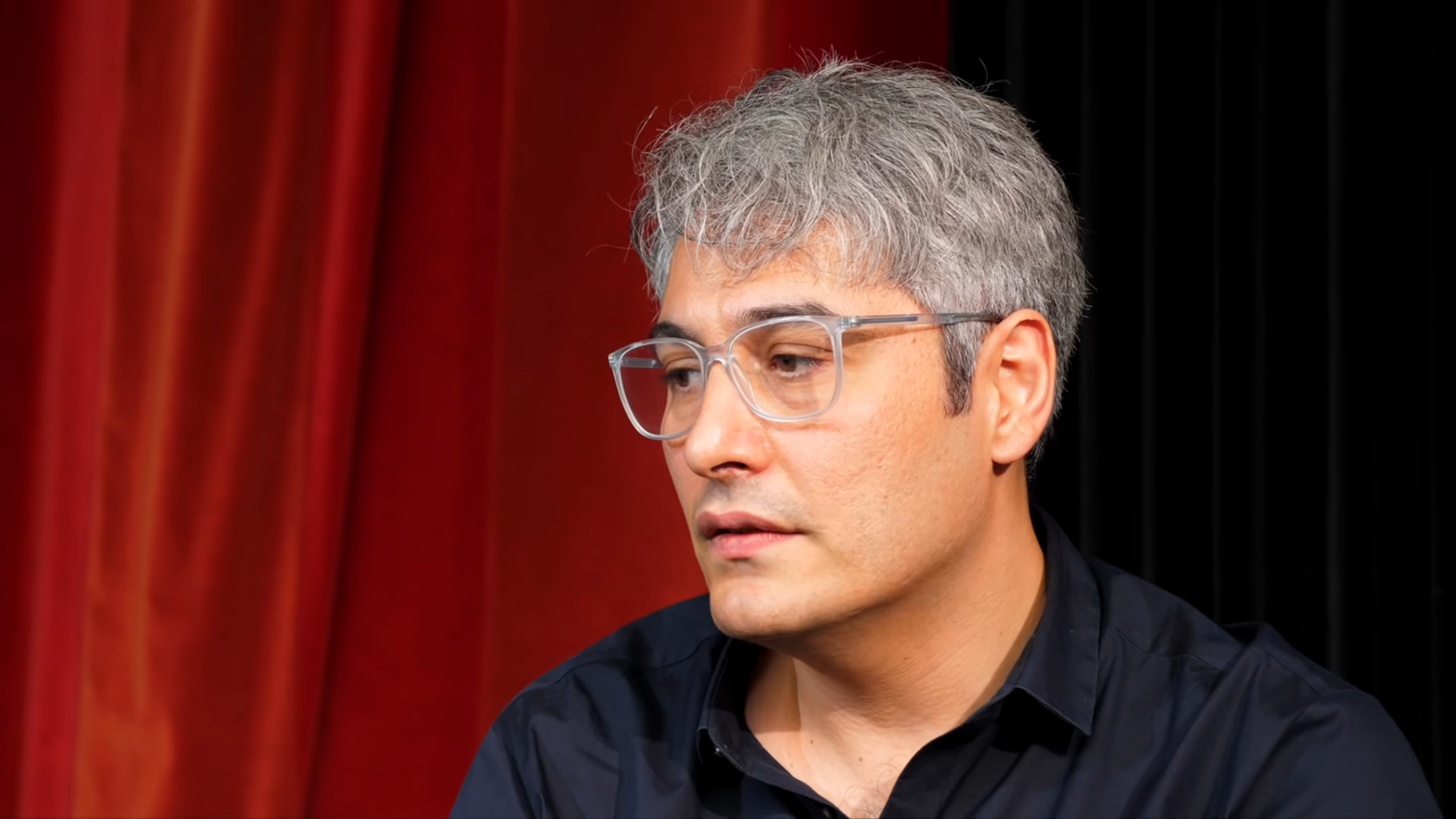
- Born: 1977 (age 48–49); Tehran, Iran
- Education: University of Guilan; Islamic Azad University
- Occupation: Architect
- Spouse: Zahra Jahani
- Children: Afra Taghaboni
- Awards: 2018 Royal Academy Dorfman Award
- Practice: NextOffice
- Buildings: Sharifi-ha House; Cedrus Residential; Guyim Vault House; Afarinesh Tower
- Projects: Mashhad C.E.O. Headquarters
- Website: NextOffice

Alireza Taghaboni (Persian: علیرضا تغابنی), (born 1977) is an Iranian architect, author, and educator based in Tehran, Iran. He is, a practicing architect since 2004 and founded NextOffice (an architectural firm in Iran) in 2009. He has designed contemporary buildings in Tehran, such as the Sharifi-ha House and Cedrus Residential. He is also the Dean of CAAI (the Contemporary Architects Association of Iran). He is on the faculty at the Center for Contemporary Architecture in Tehran.

== Background ==
Taghaboni was born in Tehran in 1977. In 1995, he studied architecture in Guilan, Iran at University of Guilan. In 2002, he earned a master's degree in architecture. He is known for his inventive and experimental architecture. He earned a Ph.D. in architecture from Tehran's Azad University, and he works at the Center for Contemporary Architecture in Tehran on the faculty.

== Career ==
He began his architecture practice in 2004, parallel to his doctoral course, and he opened an architecture firm (NextOffice) in 2009. He created the contemporary Sharifi-ha House with a moving facade in 2013. He also created the Cedrus Residential with its contemporary multi-layer facade and staggered balconies. He has designed 60 projects.

In July 2025, Taghaboni attended the closing of “The Birth of Scale” exposition at the National Centre RUSSIA in Moscow, taking part in the event’s business and educational program and panel discussions alongside architects from Egypt, India, and South Africa. Reflecting on the exhibition, he emphasized how shared building techniques; particularly brick and other forms of masonry, link cultures through geometry, color, material, and structure. Outlining his professional outlook, Taghaboni argued that architects should be “radical” in design while avoiding ideological preconceptions, and that combining theoretical inquiry with careful observation and listening is essential to meet contemporary challenges.

In an interview with the Financial Times he said that he was inspired by postwar Japan.

== Awards ==
=== International Awards ===
- 2018 Royal Academy Dorfman Award
- 2018 World Architecture Festival award (WAF) for the Guyim Vault House (2 categories)
- 2019 WAF Category Winner
- 2023 WAF Category Winner (3 categories)
- 2023 Inside World Festival of Interiors Category Winner
- 2025 Architizer A+Awards Finalist in Residential Multi-Unit Housing

=== National awards ===
- Memar Award 96 – 3rd Prize Winner (Residential Individual Apartments Category)
- Memar Award 94 – 3rd Prize Winner (Residential Individual Apartments Category)
- Memar Award 94 – 1st Prize Winner (Restorations Category)
- Memar Award 91 – 2nd Prize Winner (Residential Buildings Category)
- Memar Award 90 – 1st Prize Winner (Restorations Category)
- Façade Design Using Natural Material Competition 1st Prize Winner
- Designing the Corporate Building for the Qazvin Construction Engineering Organization (Q. C. E. O.) Competition – Winner (Best Design)

== Books ==
In 2022, he authored his first book, Momas Ba Asar (Persian: مماس با اثر), in collaboration with Gilgamesh Publications.

Momas Ba Asar. Gilgamesh Publications. 2022. ISBN 978-622-7858-15-0.

Convergent Book 2020-2021. Intishārāt-i Miʻmārān-i Muʻāṣir. 2022. ISBN 978-600-97672-4-3.

Taghaboni, Alireza; Rouhi, Pouyan. Against ideology. ISBN 978-622-6963-56-5.

Duals - Volume 1. Gilgamesh Publications. 2024. ISBN 978-622-7858-82-2.

Duals - Volume 2. Gilgamesh Publications. 2024. ISBN 978-622-7858-83-9.

== Personal life ==
In 2015, he married architect Zahra Jahani.
