= Mehrzad =

- Gender: Male

Origin
- Region of origin: Iran (Persia)

Other names
- Related names: Mehrdad

Mehrzad (Persian: مهرزاد) is a Persian male and female given name popular in Iran. Mehr (مهر) means "sun" and Zād (زاد) means "born of". So the literal meaning of Mehrzād (مهرزاد) is born of sun.

== Given name of Mehrzad ==
- Mehrzad Marashi (born 1980), Iranian-German singer
- Mehrzad Madanchi (born 1985), Iranian football midfielder

== Surname of Mehrzad ==
- Turan Mehrzad (1930–2023), Iranian actress
