= Mithridates the Great =

Mithridates the Great can refer to either three monarchs:

- Mithridates I of Parthia (d. 132 BC) king of the Parthian Empire from 165 BC to 132 BC
- Mithridates II of Parthia (d. 91 BC), king of the Parthian Empire from 124 BC to 91 BC
- Mithridates VI Eupator (135–63 BC), king of Pontus from 120 BC to 63 BC

== See also ==
- Mithridates (disambiguation)
