= Mahari =

Mahari is a Hebrew acronym, referring to any one of a number of rabbis:

- Yaakov ben Moshe Levi Moelin (1365–1427), known as Maharil, Mahari Segal or Mahari Moelin
- Yehuda Leib Schneersohn (1811–1866), Ukrainian Hasidic rabbi, first leader of the Kapust Hasidim
- Israel Isserlin (1390–1460), known as Mahari Isserlin
- Jacob Weil (fl. 15th century), known as Mahari Weil or Mahariv
- Judah ben Eliezer ha-Levi Minz (1405–1508), known as Mahari Mintz
- Isaac da Fonseca Aboab (1605–1693), known as Mahari Abuhav
- Yitzchak Isaac of Zidichov (1805–1873), Hasidic rebbe and midrash commentator

Mahari may also refer to:

- Abu Bakar Mahari (born 1985), Bruneian footballer
- Gurgen Mahari (1903–1969), Armenian writer, born Gurgen Ajemian

== See also ==
- Mahara (disambiguation)
- Mahari dance, a dance form in Odisha, India
