= Darrous =

Neighbourhood in Tehran, Iran

Darrous دروس
- neighbourhood
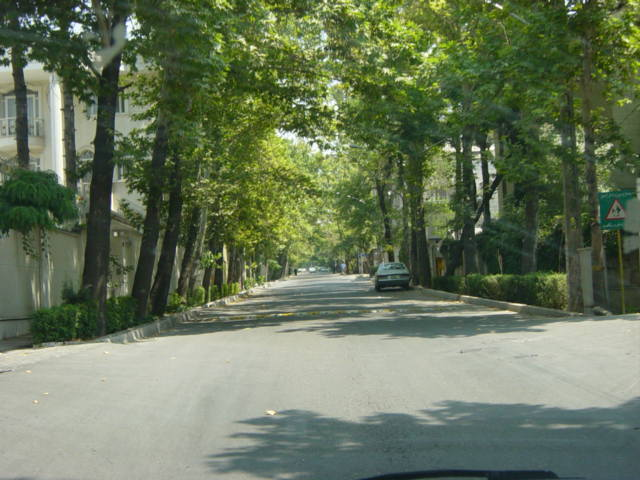
- Hedayat St., Darrous.
- Interactive map of Darrous
- City: Tehran
- Country: Iran
- District: 3

Government
  - Councillor: Fatemeh Soori

Population (2011)
  - Total: 21,037
- Website: region3.tehran.ir

Darrous (Persian: دروس) is a neighbourhood in Shemiran, northern Tehran, Iran. It is considered one of the most affluent areas in the city, as many modern and fashionable families reside there. Darrous is bounded by Pasdaran, Gholhak, Doulat, and Ekhtiyarieh.

Mehdi Gholi Hedayat (Mokhber-ol Saltaneh), a renowned aristocrat of the late Qajar era, was the main land owner in this area prior to 1950s, which at that time consisted of expansive gardens and farms. Beside holding other high offices such as governor of Fars and Azerbaijan, during the constitutional era, he served from 1927 to 1933 as prime minister during the reign of Reza Shah. His legacy still survives in the area in the form of a mosque, a medical clinic, and a school, all named Hedayat and located on Hedayat Street.

Many foreign embassies are located in Darrous including those of Spain, Hungary, Portugal, Colombia, Argentina and Kazakhstan. In addition, Darrous is home to various United Nations agencies.

== Notable residents ==
- Mehdi Qoli Hedayat, former Prime Minister
- Gholam-Ali Haddad-Adel, former Speaker of Parliament
- Fereydoun Farrokhzad, singer, actor, poet, TV and radio host, writer, and opposition political figure
- Forugh Farrokhzad, poet and film director
- Mohammad Bagher Ghalibaf, Mayor of Tehran
- Kaveh Golestan, photojournalist and artist
- Lili Golestan, translator and artistic director of Golestan Gallery
- Amir-Abbas Hoveyda, former Prime Minister of Iran
- Sir Horace Phillips, British diplomat

== See also ==
- Sharifi-ha House
