= MAH =

Mah may refer to:

- Mah, the Avestan language word for both the moon and for the Zoroastrian divinity
- Maharashtra, a state in western India (postal code MAH)
- Malév Hungarian Airlines (ICAO code), the flag carrier airline of Hungary
- Mansion House tube station, London, London Underground station code
- Menorca Airport (IATA airport code), the airport serving the Balearic island of Minorca in the Mediterranean Sea
- Milli Emniyet Hizmeti, former Turkish government intelligence agency
- milliampere-hour, often abbreviated as mAh or mA·h, a unit of electric charge
- Monocyclic aromatic hydrocarbon, a type of chemical compound
- My American Heart, an American band
- M.A.H., an honorary master's degree granted ad eundem
- Santa Cruz Museum of Art and History, Santa Cruz, California

== See also ==
- Mah (disambiguation)
