= Sharifi-ha House =

Modular home in Tehran, Iran

- خانه شریفی ها
- Sharifa-ha House with boxes in open position
- Interactive map of the Sharifi-ha House area
- Alternative names: Sharifia-ha House

General information
- Type: Residential
- Architectural style: Contemporary architecture
- Location: Darrous neighborhood, Tehran, Iran
- Coordinates: 35.7714°N 51.4544°E
- Completed: 2013
- Owner: Mojgan Zare Nayeri, Farshad Sharifi Nikabadi

Technical details
- Material: Concrete, steel, wood
- Floor count: 7
- Floor area: 14,000 Square meters

Design and construction
- Architect: Alireza Taghaboni
- Architecture firm: Next Office
- Engineer: Bumat Company
- Structural engineer: S. Fallahi
- Awards: Grand Memar Award 2014 1st Prize Residential; Middle East Award (MEA) 2014 1st Prize Residential
- Known for: Rooms which rotate 90°

Other information
- Parking: Ground floor garage

Sharifi-ha House is a modular home in Tehran, Iran. It was built in 2013 and has three wooden boxes which are rooms; the boxes can be rotated laterally. The resulting 90 degree rotation extends the living space and creates a large terrace.

== Background ==
The home was designed by Alireza Taghaboni from Next Office. The unique design was created because there was only a narrow lot to work with, which measured 11 by 33 metres (36 ft × 108 ft). The façade faces South and it is the only part of the house which can get natural light. It is located in the Darrous neighborhood and was designed to accommodate climate and lifestyle. The home was named Sharifi-ha which means "Sharif's family" in Persian.

The home was created with three wood clad rotating boxes which can be positioned to take advantage of the natural light. In the winter months the boxes can remain closed and in the summer they can be rotated independently and extended 3 metres (9.8 ft) out of the façade.

There are two basement floors with a fitness area, and above that floor there is a section for a housekeeper. The next four floors are living areas of the home. The home also has a pool and a sauna.

== Design ==
The concrete structure has seven floors and is 15,000 sq ft (1,400 m^{2}). There are three rotating boxes which are steel frames clad with planks of wood. Each box has French doors which are at right angles so that each box can be accessed when the façade is closed or opened. The boxes can be rotated 90 degrees, and it takes 20 seconds to rotate each box using an electric turntable. The turntables were designed by the German company Bumat using a system similar to those found in car exhibitions.

When in the open position a terrace is created because the boxes are rectangles with a single pivot point. When the box rotates a guard rail which is folded extends to provide a railing for the terrace. Many Iranians use outdoor space during the summer months.

== Reception ==
CNN's Matthew Ponsford and Layla Maghribi compared the home to a Rubik's Cube and they called it the Transformer House. The home won several awards: Grand Memar Award 2014 1st Prize Residential and the Middle East Award (MEA) 2014 1st Prize Residential.

== See also ==
- Nakagin Capsule Tower
