= Doulat =

District of Tehran, Iran

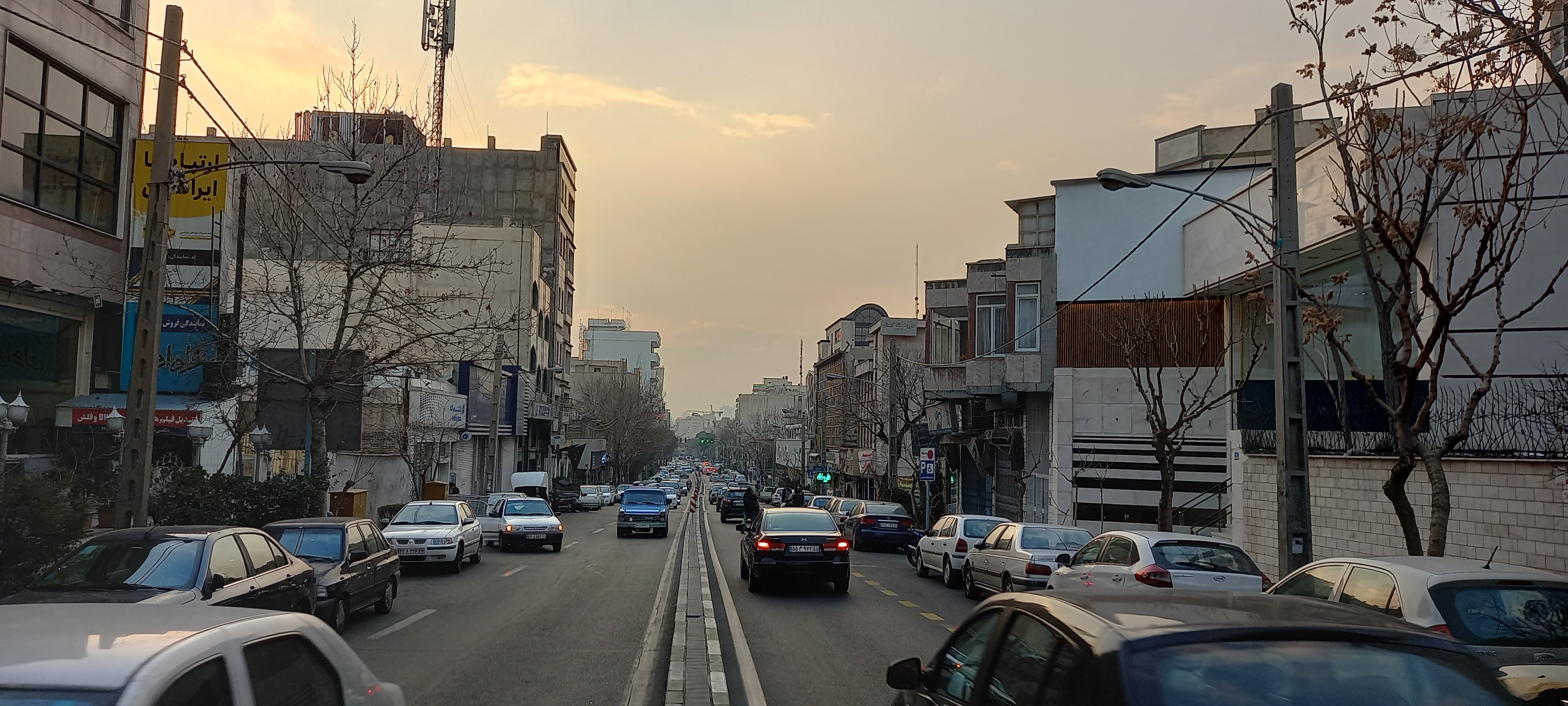
Kolahdooz (Doulat) Street in January 2022

Doulat (also spelled Dowlat) is a district in northern Tehran, Iran.

Doulat is mostly suburban and located between Shariati street and Pasdaran street. It neighbors Daroos, Dibaji, Ekhtiarieh districts. Many shops and restaurants are located in the neighborhood.

Doulat ("government") is the former name of a street in the district. After the Iranian Revolution the name of the street was changed to "Shahid Yousef Kolahdooz" in honor of Yousef Kolahdouz, a co-founder of the IRGC.

There are many apartments in the alleys and streets which are connected to Kolahdooz Street. The area sees heavy vehicle traffic, particularly during rush hour. The cemetery for World War II soldiers is located on this street.
