= Mithras (name) =

Etymology of the name

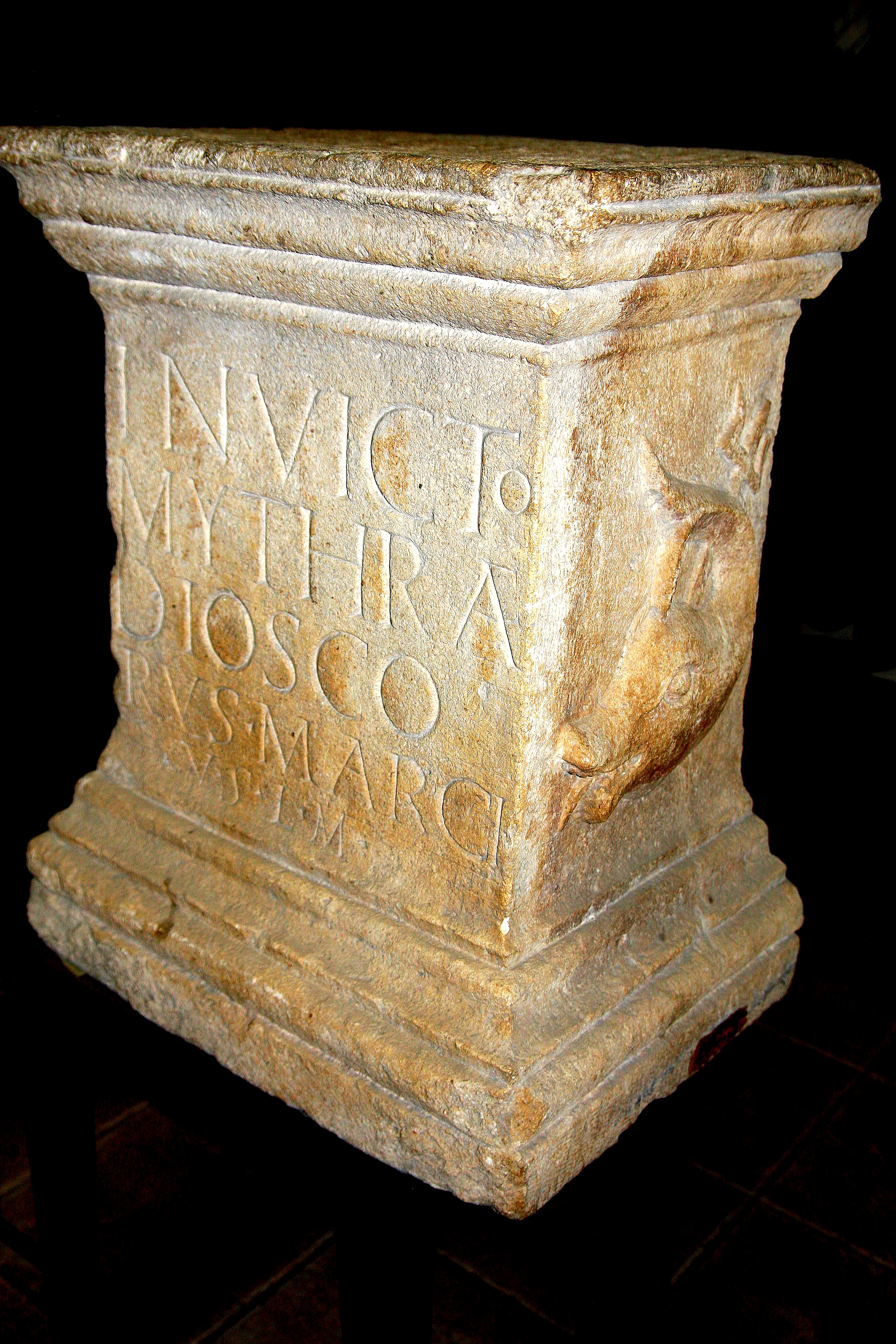
A memorial stele inscribed with the name.

The name Mithras (Latin, equivalent to Greek "Μίθρας",) is a form of Mithra, the name of an Iranian god, a point acknowledged by Mithras scholars since the days of Franz Cumont. The Greek form of the name appears in Xenophon's biography of Cyrus, the Cyropaedia, a work written in the fourth century BC.

The word Mithra occurs as the name of a praiseworthy being in the Zoroastrian text, the Zend Avesta. Similar deity names in related Indo-European languages include Mitra, "मित्रः" found in Rig Vedic hymns. In Sanskrit, "mitra" means "friend" or "friendship".

In the inscribed peace treaty of c. 1400 BC between Hittites and the Hurrian kingdom of the Mitanni in the area southeast of Lake Van in Armenian Highlands, the form mi-it-ra- appears as the name of a god invoked together with four other divinities as witnesses and keepers of the pact. Robert Turcan describes this inscription as "the earliest evidence of Mithras in Asia Minor".

The exact form of a Latin or classical Greek word varies due to the grammatical process of declension. There is archeological evidence that in Latin worshippers wrote the nominative form of the god's name as "Mithras". However, in Porphyry's Greek text De Abstinentia (Περὶ αποχης εμψγχων), there is a reference to the now-lost histories of the Mithraic mysteries by Euboulus and Pallas, the wording of which suggests that these authors treated the name "Mithra" as an indeclinable foreign word.

In later antiquity, the Greek name of Mithras (Μίθραϲ) occurs in the text known as the Mithras Liturgy, part of the Paris Great Magical Papyrus (Paris Bibliothèque Nationale Suppl. gr. 574); here Mithras is given the epithet "the great god", and is identified with the sun god Helios. There have been different views among scholars as to whether this text is an expression of Mithraism as such. Franz Cumont argued that it isn't; Marvin Meyer thinks it is; while Hans Dieter Betz sees it as a synthesis of Greek, Egyptian, and Mithraic traditions.

The Persian associations of the name Mithras are acknowledged by scholars such as David Ulansey who interpret Roman Mithraism as something new. A scenario discussed by Ulansey is that "the Roman cult of Mithras was actually a new religion" which "borrowed the name of an Iranian god in order to give itself an exotic oriental flavor".

According to another historian of Mithraism, John R. Hinnells: "The god is unique in being worshipped in four distinct religions: Hinduism (as Mitra), in Iranian Zoroastrianism and Manicheism (as Mithra), and in the Roman Empire (as Mithras)." Mary Boyce, a researcher of ancient Iranian religions, writes that even though Roman Empire Mithraism seems have had less Iranian content than historians used to think, still "as the name Mithras alone shows, this content was of some importance."
