= Malaysian Humanitarian Aid and Relief =

Malaysian humanitarian organisation

- Abbreviation: MAHAR
- Formation: 6 April 2016
- Type: Non-governmental organisation
- Legal status: Non-profit
- Purpose: Humanitarian aid and relief
- Headquarters: Kuala Lumpur, Malaysia
- Region served: Malaysia and selected international responses
- President: Jismi Johari
- Website: mahar.my

Malaysian Humanitarian Aid and Relief (MAHAR) is a Kuala Lumpur–based non-governmental organisation focused on humanitarian assistance and advocacy. The group has worked with refugee-support initiatives in Malaysia and has issued public appeals related to crises abroad, including Gaza and Syria.

== History ==
MAHAR states it was formed on 6 April 2016 and is based in Kuala Lumpur. The group has made its appearance in 15 countries around the globe through humanitarian programs and charity projects. MAHAR encourages youth development by creating a humanitarian and volunteer mentality. Their collaboration with the Malaysian Youth and Sports Ministry for MyCorps has resulted in over 350 professional humanitarian activists deploying to 15 nations.

== Programs ==
=== Syrian Migrants Temporary Settlement Programme (PPSMS) ===
Academic and policy literature describe the Malaysian government’s Syrian Migrants Temporary Settlement Programme (Program Penempatan Sementara Migran Syria, PPSMS) and note MAHAR’s facilitating role within it. Sources state that MAHAR registers Syrian applicants, liaises with agencies such as the Royal Malaysia Police and the Immigration Department of Malaysia for the issuance of the IMM13 visit pass, and provides consultation services to participants.

Malaysia initiated a Syrian Migrants Temporary Settlement Programme (PPSMS) in 2015 to host approximately 3,000 Syrian refugees, providing them with temporary residence and work rights via IMM13 permits, and enabling access to schools and public hospitals. While the programme aimed to offer a safe haven, Syrian refugees faced significant human security challenges due to Malaysia's non-ratification of the 1951 Refugee Convention. The programme's implementation was managed by agencies like Malaysian Humanitarian Aid and Relief (MAHAR), acting as an intermediary between refugees and government bodies.

Ops Ihsan

Ops Ihsan is a collaborative effort between the Malaysian government and more than 50 non-governmental organizations (NGOs) to deliver humanitarian aid to Palestinians in Gaza led by MAHAR.

On December 18, 2023, at the time, the Malaysian King, Al-Sultan Abdullah, viewed the humanitarian aid preparations. The inspection was also attended by Deputy Prime Minister Datuk Seri Ahmad Zahid Hamidi. His Majesty inspected and witnessed preparations for the third delivery of the Ops Ihsan humanitarian aid. This shipment included 60 tonnes of medical supplies, food, baby items, and winter clothing for Palestinians.

On 11 November 2023, Johari said a second Ops Ihsan flight carrying 20 tonnes of donated items had arrived in Egypt, bringing the cumulative total to 40 tonnes at that point; the aid was to be handed to the Egyptian Red Crescent for transit to Gaza via Rafah.

In April 2024, the Deputy Foreign Minister said Malaysia had by then dispatched over 1,500 tonnes of aid to Gaza through Ops Ihsan and other NGOs.

=== Covid-19 Pandemic ===
Since its establishment, MAHAR has been active in community assistance. During the Covid-19 pandemic, the organisation distributed over 45,000 cooked meals, donated clothing to DBKL homeless shelters, and provided basic food aid to underprivileged families. MAHAR also extended support to refugee and migrant communities within the Klang Valley.

=== Public appeals and humanitarian campaigns ===
MAHAR has issued statements calling for unrestricted humanitarian access in Gaza and condemning starvation as a weapon of war. In 2025 it announced a qurban programme in seven countries, citing an expected reach of more than 16,000 beneficiaries. The organisation has also publicly supported Malaysia’s commitment to post-war reconstruction efforts in Gaza.

== Leadership ==
Bernama reports identify Jismi Johari as president and have quoted Nurul Izzah Anwar as an adviser in MAHAR statements in 2025.

== See also ==
- Refugees in Malaysia
- Humanitarian aid
