= Qaleh Bin, Kuhestani-ye Talesh =

Qaleh Bin قلعه بين
- Village
- Location within Iran
- Coordinates: 37°53′20″N 48°39′08″E
- Country: Iran
- Province: Gilan
- County: Talesh
- Bakhsh: Central
- Rural District: Kuhestani-ye Talesh

Population (2016)
  - Total: 51
- Time zone: UTC+3:30 (IRST)

Qaleh Bin (Persian: قلعه بين, also Romanized as Qal‘eh Bīn) is a village in Kuhestani-ye Talesh Rural District, in the Central District of Talesh County, Gilan Province, Iran. At the 2016 census, its population was 51 people, in 14 households. Kabud Mehr, an Azeri-populated locality with 33 people and 10 households in 2016, merged with Qaleh Bin village in 2023.
