= Mah (disambiguation) =

Mah is the moon figure of Zoroastrianism.

Mah also may refer to:

- An alternative spelling of Ma (surname)
- mAh, milli ampere hour, a unit of electric charge
- Maharashtra, a state in western India (postal code MAH)
- Ljubljana Marsh, occasionally named Mah, also meaning 'moss' in Slovene
- Mah. mahallesi, districts in Turkey

Languages:

- Mah, also known as Mann language of West Africa
- mah, code for Marshallese language of the central Pacific

People:

- Jeannie Mah (born 1952), Canadian ceramic artist
- Theresa Mah, American politician

== See also ==
- MAH (disambiguation)
