= Mihri =

Mihri is a word of Turkish language origin, and it may refer to:

- Mihri Pektaş (1895–1979), Turkish school teacher and one of the first 18 female parliament members of Turkey
- Mihri Belli (1915–2011), Turkish socialist politician
- Mihri Hatun (died 1506), Ottoman female poet
- Mihri Müşfik Hanım (1886–c. 1954), Turkish female painter
