= University of Guilan =

University in Iran

- دانشگاه گيلان
- Other name: UG
- Motto: "Stay Scientific, Stay Green"
- Type: Public
- Established: 1967; 59 years ago
- Affiliations: Ministry of Science, Research and Technology (Iran)
- President: Ali Basti
- Faculty: Over 650
- Students: 19000
- Location: Rasht, Guilan, Iran
- Campus: Multiple sites
- Language: Persian, English
- Website: guilan.ac.ir/en/home

The University of Guilan (Persian: دانشگاه گیلان) is a public research university in Rasht, Guilan, Iran.

It has nearly 19000 students enrolled. [3] [4]

== History ==
The university was founded in 1974 as a collaborative effort between Iran and West Germany. It began with 170 students and 10 faculty members in the faculty of engineering and faculty of literature, offering courses such as Civil Engineering and German Literature.

== Ranking ==
1. Times Higher Education (THE) 2024 World Rank: 1201-1500 Subject Ranking: : 601 - 800 (Engineering), 801 - 1000 (Life Science), 801 - 1000 (Science) Asia Ranking: 351 -400

2. Shanghai Ranking World Ranking 2020: 901 - 1000 Subject Ranking 2023: 301 - 400 (Engineering)

3. The UI GreenMetric 2023 World Ranking: 1004

4. Webometrics 2023 World Ranking (July) 2023: 1359

5. Scimago Journal & Country Rank 2024 World Rank: 2534

6. CWTS Leiden Ranking 2023 Scientific impact: 792 Collaboration: 1018 Open access publishing: 1018 Gender diversity: 982

7. University Ranking by Academic Academic Performance 2023-24 World Ranking: 1136

8. uniRank 2023 World Ranking: 3824

9. US NEWs Global University Ranking 2023 World Ranking: 1422

10. Nature Index Ranking 2023 Overall Ranking: 6004 Iranian Universities Ranking: 52

11. Islamic World Science Citation Center (ISC) 2023 World Ranking: 1801- 2000 Islamic Universities Ranking: 176 - 200

== Academics ==
The University of Guilan offers degrees in 55 fields for Bachelors, 35 fields for Masters, and seven fields for PhD studies.

The Caspian Journal of Environmental Sciences is a semi-annual official publication of AUCRS (Association of Universities of Caspian Region States), published by University of Guilan.

There is a range of courses offered in the faculties of Science, Mathematics, Engineering, Agriculture, Humanities, Physical Education, Natural Resources, and the College of Art and Architecture. More than 112 courses are on offer in 35 departments leading to B.Sc., M.Sc., B.A., M.A., and Ph.D. degrees.

With nearly 650 faculty members, nine faculties, and three research centers, all in a large campus, as well as some other places in Guilan province, the University of Guilan, is the largest and one of the most premier academic institutions in northern Iran.

=== Ranking ===
University rankings

World rankings
- THE World: 1001-1200
- USNWR World: 1321

Canadian rankings
- THE National: 33
- USNWR National: 24

== Campus ==
The university is spread over four campuses with a total area of about 3 km^{2}.

== Faculties ==
The University of Guilan has spread over four campuses housing nine faculties, as well as an International Campus and some research centers. The main faculties and their departments are:

- Faculty of Architecture and Arts

1. Department of Architecture

2. Department of Urban Planning and Design

3. Department of Painting

4. Department of Graphics

5. Department of Music

Notable people: Alireza Taghaboni

- Faculty of Agricultural Sciences

1. Department of Animal Sciences

2. Department of Biosystems Engineering

3. Department of Water Engineering

4. Department of Soil Science

5. Department of Food Sciences and Technology

6. Department of Horticultural Sciences

7. Department of Plant Protection

8. Department of Plant Production

9. Department of Plant Biotechnology

10. Department of Agricultural Economics

- Faculty of Engineering

1. Department of Civil Engineering

2. Department of Chemical Engineering

3. Department of Computer Engineering

4. Department of Electrical Engineering

5. Department of Textile Engineering

6. Department of Nanotechnology

- Faculty of Engineering and Technology (Eastern Guilan)

1. Department of Civil Engineering

2. Department of Industrial Engineering

3. Department of Computer Engineering and Engineering Sciences

- Faculty of Literature and Humanities

1. Department of Persian Language and Literature

2. Department of English Language and Literature

3. Department of Arabic Language and Literature

4. Department of Russian Language

5. Department of Law

6. Department of Political Sciences

7. Department of Geography

8. Department of Sociology

9. Department of Psychology

10. Department of Management

11. Department of Educational Sciences

12. Department of Islamic Theology

13. Department of Quranic Sciences and Hadith

- Faculty of Mathematical Sciences

1. Department of Computer Sciences

2. Department of Statistics

3. Department of Pure Mathematics

4. Department of Applied Mathematics

- Faculty of Mechanical Engineering

1. Department of Dynamics, Control and Vibrations

2. Department of Solid Design

3. Department of Thermofluids

Notable people: Abolfazl Darvizeh

- Faculty of Natural Resources

1. Department of Forestry

2. Department of Fisheries

3. Department of Environmental Sciences

4. Department of Range and Watershed Management

- Faculty of Physical Education

1. Department of Sport Sciences

2. Department of Sport Management

3. Department of Sport Biomechanics

4. Department of Sport Injury and Corrective Exercise

5. Department of Exercise Physiology

- Faculty of Sciences

1. Department of Chemistry

2. Department of Physics

3. Department of Sciences

== International Journals ==
1. Aquatic Animals Nutrition
2. Caspian Journal of Environmental Sciences
3. Journal of Algebra and Related Topics
4. Journal of Mathematical Modeling
