= Mehran Maham =

Iranian producer and screenwriter

- مهران مهام
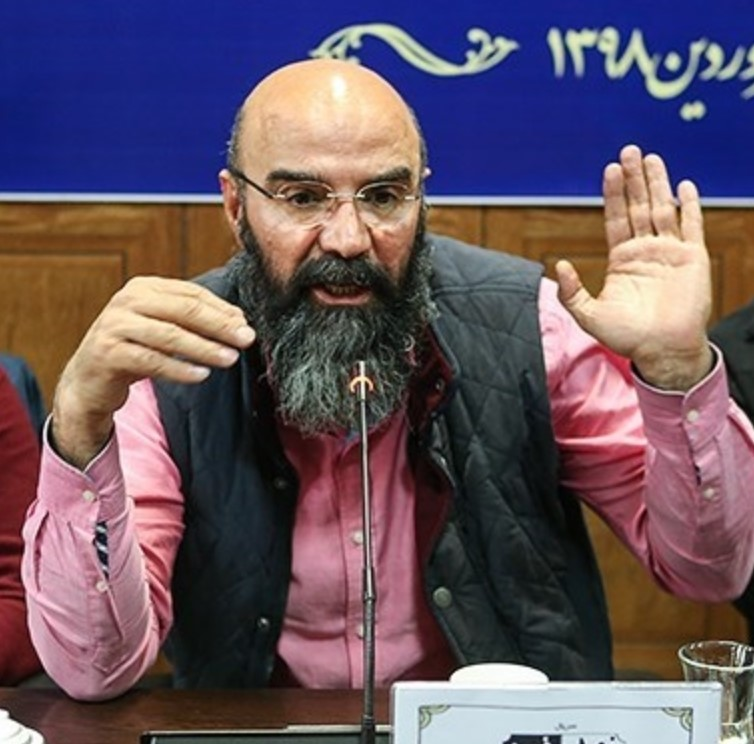
- Born: March 21, 1969 (age 56); Tehran, Iran
- Occupations: Screenwriter; producer
- Years active: 1998–present
- Spouse: Zohreh FakourSabour (m. 2018)

Mehran Maham (born March 21, 1969) is an Iranian producer and screenwriter.

== Personal life ==
Mehran Maham, born on 21 March 1969 in Tehran, Iran. He is an Iranian producer, investor, TV presenter and actor. He has co-produced his series with Iraj Mohammadi.

== Early life ==
Maham is one of the producers and writers of Iranian films and series that has been active in recent years, and all of his series were popular.

== Film career ==
He entered the field of cinema in 2008 and during his career in cinema and television, works such as Butimar, Couple or Individual, I am a tenant, Puncture, Zan Baba, Hudhud bookstore, father's house, loved ones, great troubles, bad days, good health, detectives, Narges, etc.

== Filmography ==
- The Accused Escaped
- Nargess (TV series)
- The Beautiful City
- Fireworks Wednesday
- even or odd
- I am a tenant
- Puncture
- stepmother
- Bookstore
- Father's house
- Great pains 2
- Great pains
- Bad days, good
- Detectives
- Dotted line
- The accused fled
- Mother song
- sweet and sour
- Solar Detective and his assistant Madame
- Homeless
- Enchanted
- Good house
- House of Wishes
