= Mihira =

Mihira is an ancient Indian word meaning "Sun". It may refer to:

- Mithra, the Indo-Iranian sun god
- Varahamihira, ancient Indian astronomer
- Mihirakula, a Huna king
- Mihira Bhoja, a 9th-century ruler of the Pratihara dynasty

== See also ==
- Mehran (disambiguation)
- Mithra (disambiguation)
- Mitra (disambiguation)
- Mehr (disambiguation)
- Meher (disambiguation)
- Mehar (disambiguation)
- Mihir, an Indian male given name
