= Epistula Mithridatis =

Letter allegedly written by Mithridates VI

The Epistula Mithridatis (Latin: "Letter of Mithridates"), also known as the Letter of Mithridates to King Arsaces, is a letter allegedly written by Mithridates VI of Pontus to the Parthian king Phraates III (r. 70–57 BC). (Note: In the letter Sallust refers to Phraates as Arsaces.) The letter was discovered "among a collection of Sallustian speeches and letters probably originally produced in the first or second centuries A.D". (Note: According to Adler, this means that the context of the letter "is wholly lost to us".) In the letter, Mithridates requests Parthian aid against the troops of Lucullus, (Note: According to Adler, the time frame of the letter takes place "most likely shortly after the Battle of Tigranocerta".) and in a series of arguments, Mithridates asks the Parthians to join an alliance with Mithridates and Tigranes (king of Armenia), against the Romans. The letter, assigned to Sallust, is considered to be an important source on the Pontic–Parthian relations at the time.

According to Prof. Dr. Marek Jan Olbrycht, the letter suggests "a genuine document found by the Romans in the personal archives of Mithridates". According to Dr. Eric Adler (associate professor), the composition of the letter by Sallust, is largely the result of his own invention. Adler states that "A few scholars have asserted that the EM (Epistula Mithridatis) owes its origin to a document culled from the archives of Mithridates, which Sallust somehow acquired and translated or adapted into Latin. Some claim that Pompey discovered this epistle in a secret archive after the Third Mithridatic War, and then presumably brought to Rome. Others have supposed that the EM is an expression of authentic Pontic propaganda, and thus based on arguments that are not Sallust's own. (...) We can be reasonably certain, then, that the EM is the creation of Sallust and is the product of a Roman historian's attempt to reconstruct the likely arguments of an anti-Roman Eastern king".

== Sources ==
- Adler, Eric (2011). Valorizing the Barbarians: Enemy Speeches in Roman Historiography. Austin, Texas: University of Texas Press. ISBN 978-0-292-72628-4.
- Olbrycht, Marek Jan (2009). "Mithridates VI Eupator and Iran". In Højte, Jakob Munk (ed.). Mithridates VI and the Pontic Kingdom. Black Sea Studies. Vol. 9. Aarhus University Press. pp. 163–190. ISBN 978-8779344433. ISSN 1903-4873.
