= Mehr (name) =

- Gender: Female and Male
- Language: Persian; Urdu

Origin
- Origin: Persian
- Region of origin: Middle East, Iran and Pakistan

Mehr (Persian: مهر) is a name of Persian origin that may refer to:

== Given name or epithet ==
- Mehr-un-Nissa, name given at birth to Nur Jahan (1577–1645), Empress Consort of the Mughal Empire
- Mehr Abdul Haq (1915–1995), Pakistani linguist
- Mehr Chand Mahajan (1889–1967), former Chief Justice of the Supreme Court of India
- Mehr Hassan, American actress, model, and classical dancer
- Mehr Monir Jahanbani (1926–2018), Iranian textile designer, and fashion designer
- Mehr Jesia (born 1968), Indian supermodel

== Surname ==
- Farhang Mehr (1923–2018), Zoroastrian scholar and politician
- Haik Hovsepian Mehr (1945–1994), Iranian bishop
- Mariella Mehr (1947–2022), Swiss writer
- Nathaniel Mehr, British journalist
- Ghulam Rasool Mehr (1895–1971), Pakistani scholar and political activist

== See also ==
- Mehr (disambiguation)
