= Mehran (district) =

Neighborhood of Tehran, Iran

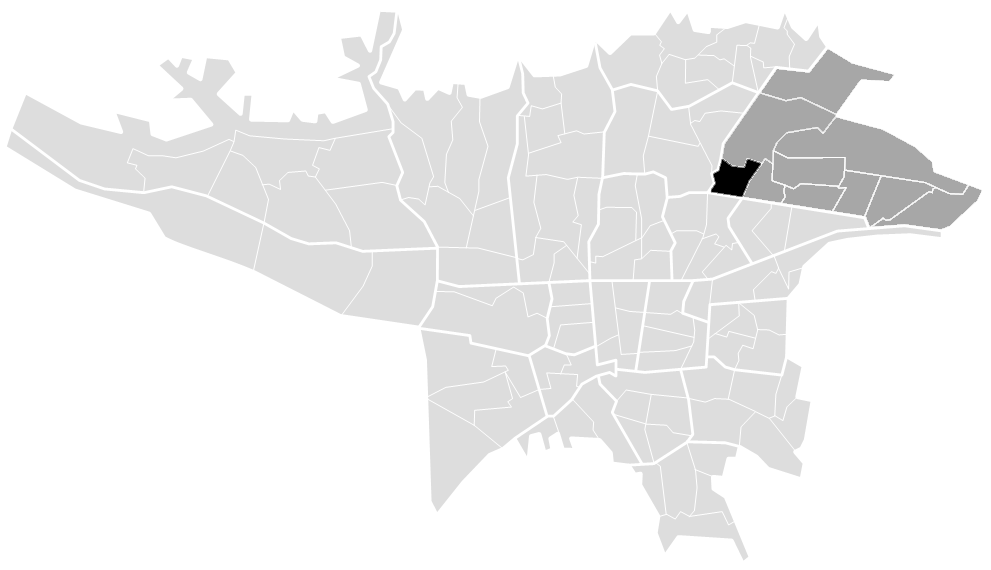
Location of Mehran (black) in Municipal District No. 4 (dark grey) of Tehran metropolis

Mehran district is a neighborhood of northern Tehran. The area is named after the Mehran garden. It is located east of Shariati Avenue, west of Niavaran Expressway, north of Resalat Expressway, and southeast of Hemmat Expressway.
