= Mahar (surname) =

Mahar/महर is a surname of Kumaoni -Khastriya Rajputs found in Uttarakhand and West Nepal. Mahars were given the title of chief 'Thogdar'/'Thokdar' and large part of Saur valley was referred as 'Mahar Patti'. The majority of the population is found in Pithoragarh and Champawat. 'Hilljatra' and 'Chaitol' are the key festivals of Mahar community. Laxman Singh Mahar, Indian Freedom Fighter,, Lieutenant Hemant Singh Mahar (Shaurya Chakra, Posthumously) and Mayukh Mahar, Indian Politician are few notable personalities of the community.

== Notable people ==
- Mayukh Mahar, Indian politician

== See also ==
- Mahar (Irish surname), an unrelated surname of Irish origin.
