= Mihr (name) =

- Gender: Female
- Language: Persian; Urdu

Origin
- Origin: Persian
- Meaning: "love", "sun"
- Region of origin: Middle East

Mihr is a name of Persian origin (مهر) that may refer to:

== Given name ==
- Emine Mihrişah Sultan (died 1732), French second concubine of Ottoman Sultan Ahmed III, and mother of Sultan Mustafa III
- Mihr-Mihroe (died 555), 6th century Sassanid general
- Mihrimah Sultan (c. 1522–1578), daughter of Ottoman Sultan Suleiman the Magnificent
- Mihrişah Sultan (c. 1745–1805), Genoese consort of Ottoman Sultan Mustafa III, and mother of Sultan Selim III
- Veh Mihr Shapur (died 442), the first marzban of Armenia
- Mihr-un-nissa Begum (b. c. 1605), daughter of Nur Jahan and wife of Shahryar Mirza
- Mihr-un-Nissa Begum (1661–1706), youngest daughter of Mughal Emperor Aurangzeb

== Other ==
- Mihr (Armenian deity)
