= Mitra (given name) =

Mitra is a given name.

People with the name include:

- Mitra Bir (died 1978), freedom fighter and educationist from Goa, India
- Mitra Farahani (born 1975), Iranian filmmaker and painter
- Mitra Farazandeh (born c. 1976), Iranian disability activist, artist
- Mitra Hajjar (born 1977), Iranian actress
- Mitra Jouhari (born 1993), American actress, and writer
- Mitra Phukan, Indian author
- Mitra Tabrizian, British-Iranian photographer and film director

== See also ==
- Mitra (surname)
