= Mehrdad =

- Pronunciation: Persian: [mehɾdɒːd]
- Gender: Male

Origin
- Origin: Persian
- Meaning: Given by Mehr
- Region of origin: Iran (Persia)

Other names
- Related names: Mithridates, Mehrzad, Mehrshad, Mehran

Mehrdad (Persian: مهرداد) is a common Persian male given name in Iran (Persia) and other Persian-speaking countries. Mehrdad is a Persian name for boys that means "given by sun" or "given by love". Mehr means "sun" or "love," and Dad means "given."

It comes from the Old Persian name "Mithradatha" and the Middle Persian name "Mehrdat", which is a theophoric name that means "given by Mithra" or "given by Mehr". "Mehr" comes from Avestan Mithra, the Zoroastrian divinity and hypo-stasis of covenant.

In modern-day Iran, the name Mehrdad is also retroactively applied to several historic Persian figures that appear in western literature as Mithridates, a Hellenized or philhellenic form of Mehrdad.

== People ==
- Mehrdad Abdi, Iranian footballer
- Mehrdad Abedi, Iranian electrical engineer
- Mehrdad Afarid, Iranian ophthalmologist
- Mehrdad Afsari (born 1977), Iranian photographer
- Mehrdad Afsharian (born 1964), Iranian cyclist
- Mehrdad Akhlaghi (born 1958), Iranian defence official
- Mehrdad Ardeshi, Iranian chess player
- Mehrdad Asemani, Iranian singer and composer
- Mehrdad Avesta, Iranian poet 1930-1991
- Mehrdad Raissi Ardali (born 1987), Iranian voice actor
- Mehrdad Bazrpash (born 1980), Iranian politician
- Mehrdad Kia, Iranian-American historian
- Mehrdad Pahlbod (1917–2018), Iranian politician
- Mehrdad Pooladi (born 1987), Iranian professional football player
- Mehrdad Tahmasebi (born 1985), Iranian football goalkeeper
- Mehrdad Takalobigashi, Iranian-British boxer
