= Ekhtiarieh =

Neighbourhood in Tehran, Iran

Coordinates: 35°47′12″N 51°27′58″E

Ekhtiyariyeh (Persian: اختیاریه; also Romanized as Ekhtiyāriyeh or Extiyāriye(h)) is a neighborhood in the district of Shemiran in northern Tehran, Iran.

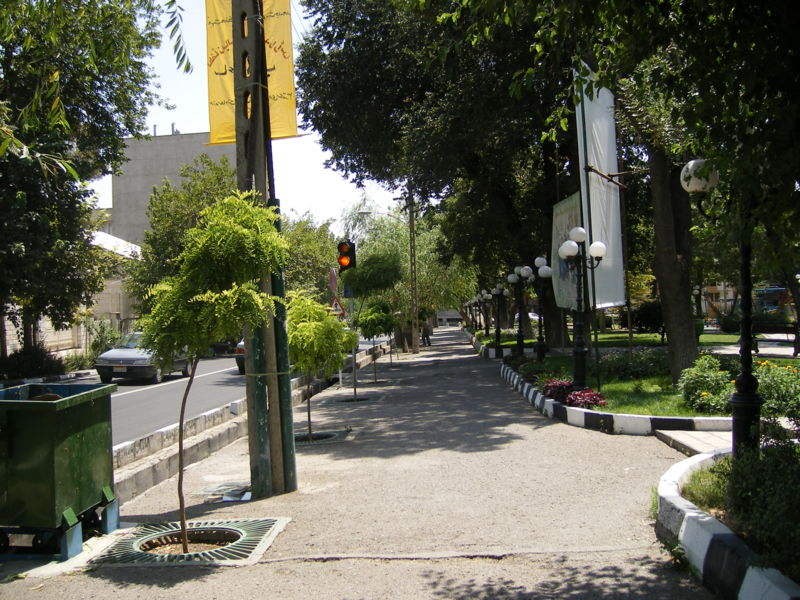
Dibaji park, 2006

Ekhtiarieh was a relatively small village in the suburbs of Tehran even back in the early 1960s. In the late 1960s and early 1970s, this village as well as the whole township of Shemiran became part of Greater Tehran.

The neighborhood is divided into three main parts, namely the north, the center (where Ekhtiyariyeh Square is located), and the south.

In the past, there were three villages around Ekhtiyariyeh.

The Village of Saltanat-Abad was located in the east and south-east, The Village of Rostam-Abad was located in the west and south-west, and the Village of Farmaniyeh was located in the north of Ekhtiyariyeh. Villages of Saltanat-Abad and Farmaniyeh have disappeared altogether, but the Village of Rostam-Abad stays somewhat intact even today.

After the 1979 Iranian Revolution, the former "Saltanat Abad Street" was named "Pasdaran Street", and the former "Kamran Street" was named "Dibaji Street".

== History ==
The whole of Ekhtiyariyeh once belonged to an aristocrat named Saheb Ekhtiyar, and his land was called Ekhtiyarieh, which could be translated as Land belonging to Ekhtiyar.

== See also ==
Dolat
